= Lower Silesian Agglomeration Railway =

Suburban rail network for the Wrocław metropolitan area

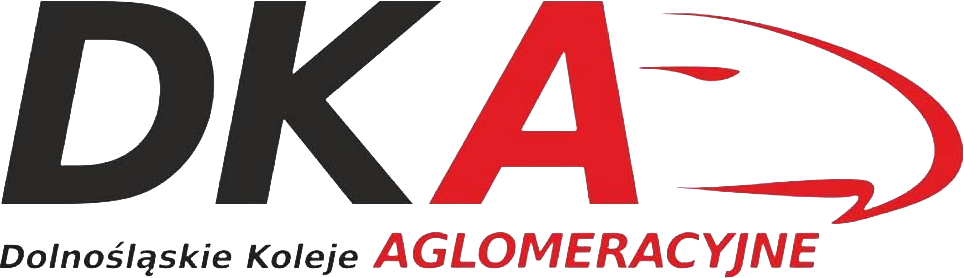

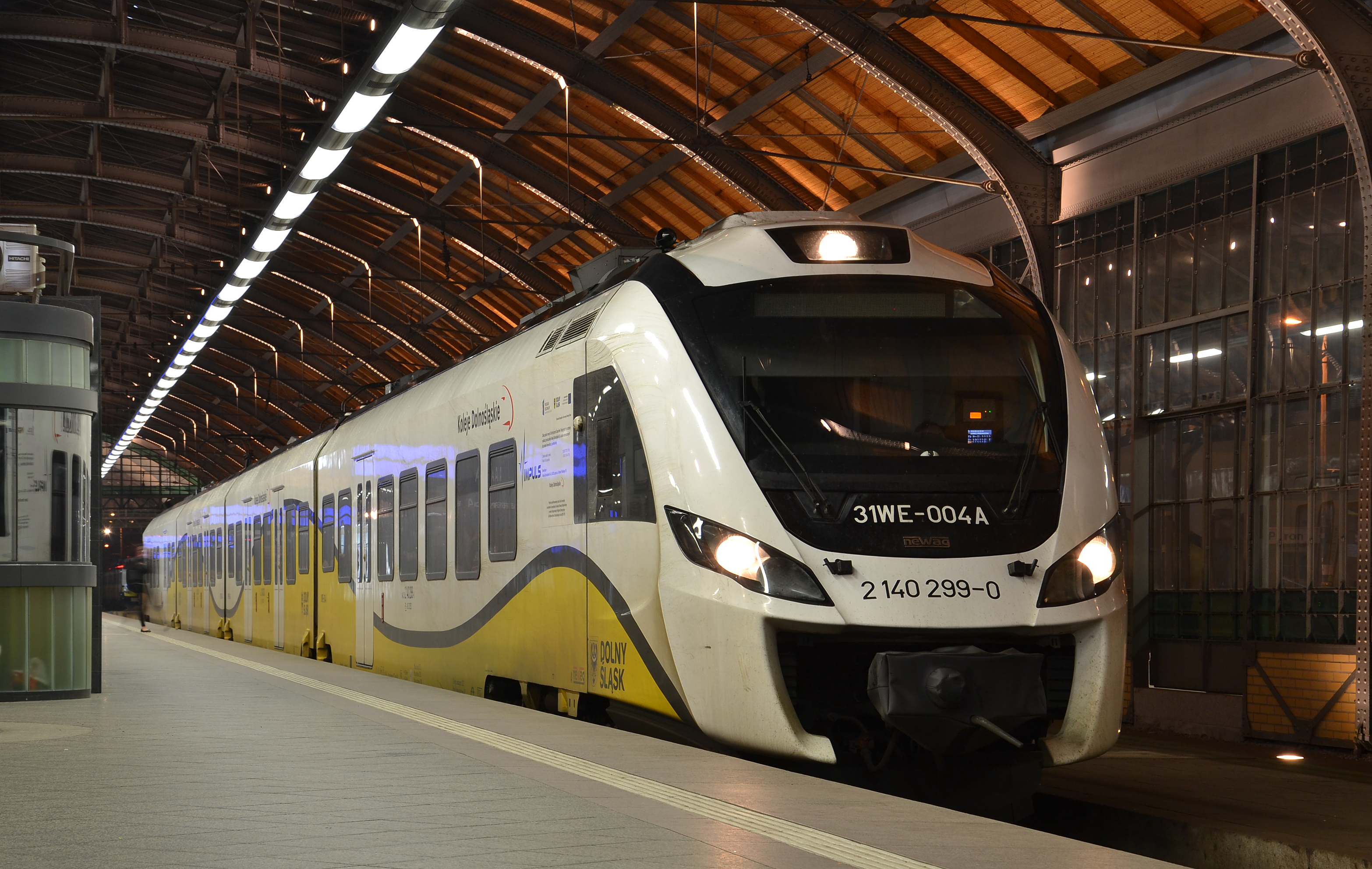

Overview
- Native name: Dolnośląskie Koleje Aglomeracyjne
- Locale: Wrocław metropolitan area
- Transit type: Commuter rail
- Number of stations: 77 (large agglomeration)

Operation
- Operator: Lower Silesian Railways Polregio

Technical
- Track gauge: 1435 mm

The Lower Silesian Agglomeration Railways (Polish: Dolnośląskie Koleje Aglomeracyjne) is a suburban rail network for the Wrocław agglomeration, covering approximately 350 km of mostly electrified double-track lines within the PKP network. Since 2009, Wrocław's authorities have been developing the system, operated primarily by regional rail operators Lower Silesian Railways and Polregio. The initiative addresses urban growth, insufficient public transport, suburban migration, traffic congestion, and air pollution.

Key milestones include reopening the Trzebnica line (2009), revitalizing the Jelcz Miłoszyce line (2021), and the integration of the Urbancard transit pass for use on suburban trains within the city (2024). The system is informally operational, with new stations (e.g., Wrocław Różanka) and increased train frequencies. Formal branding and organization are pending, with expansions like "Park and Ride" facilities supporting its growth. The name "Dolnośląskie Koleje Aglomeracyjne" was adopted in December 2021.

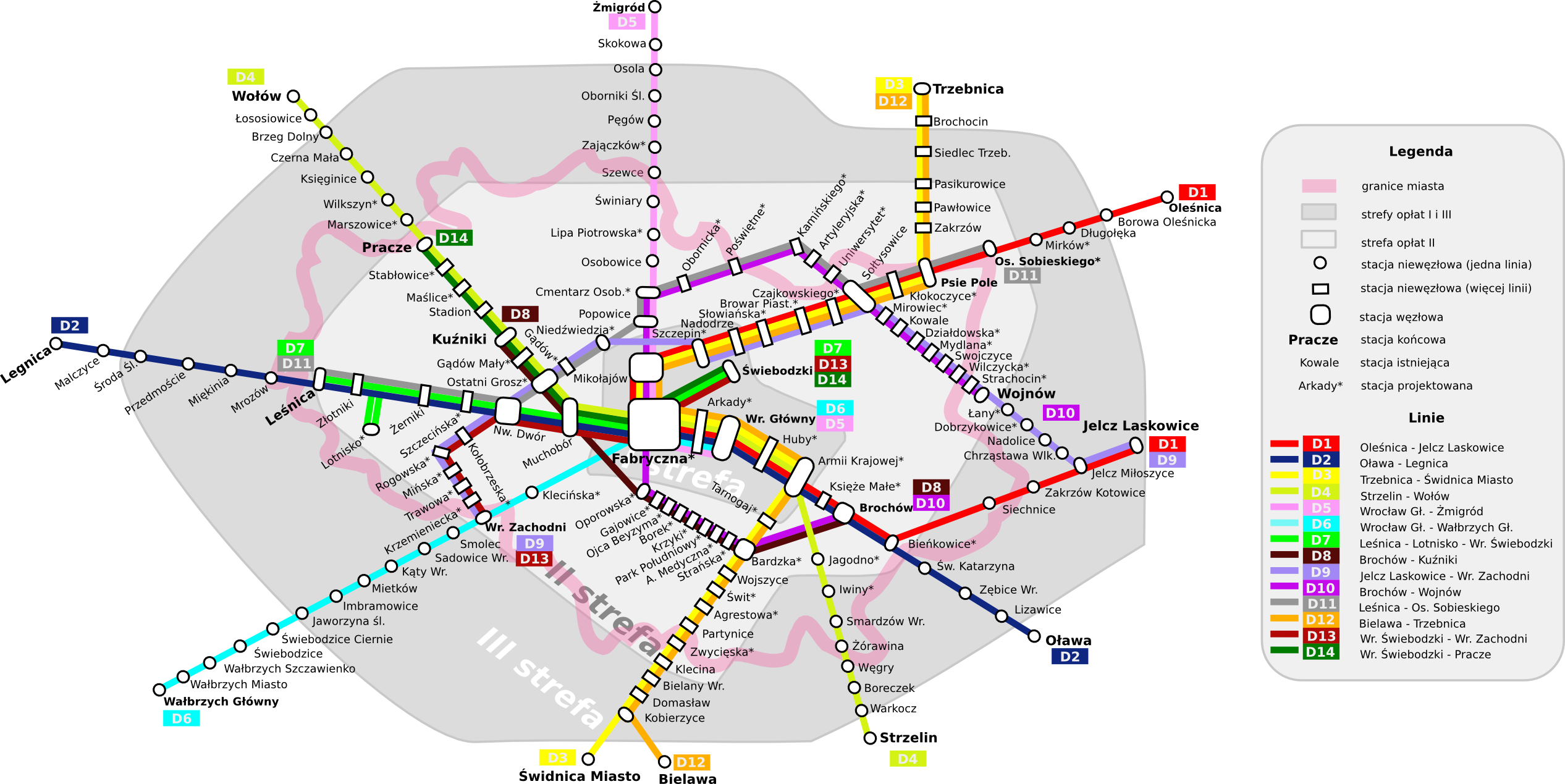
The concept of the Wrocław suburban railway network according to the Marshal's Office, utilizing, among others, Lower Silesian Railways.

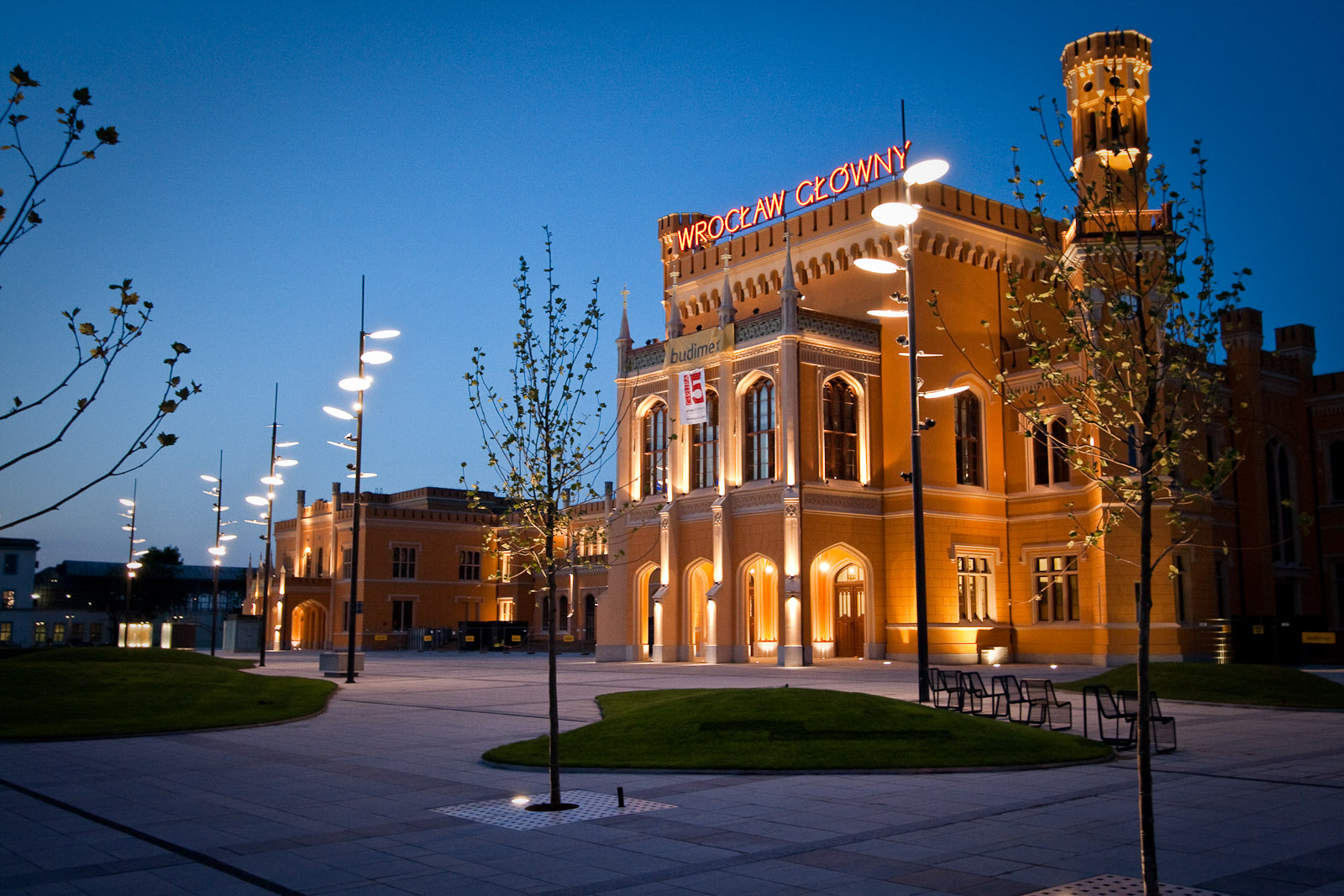
Wrocław Main Railway Station

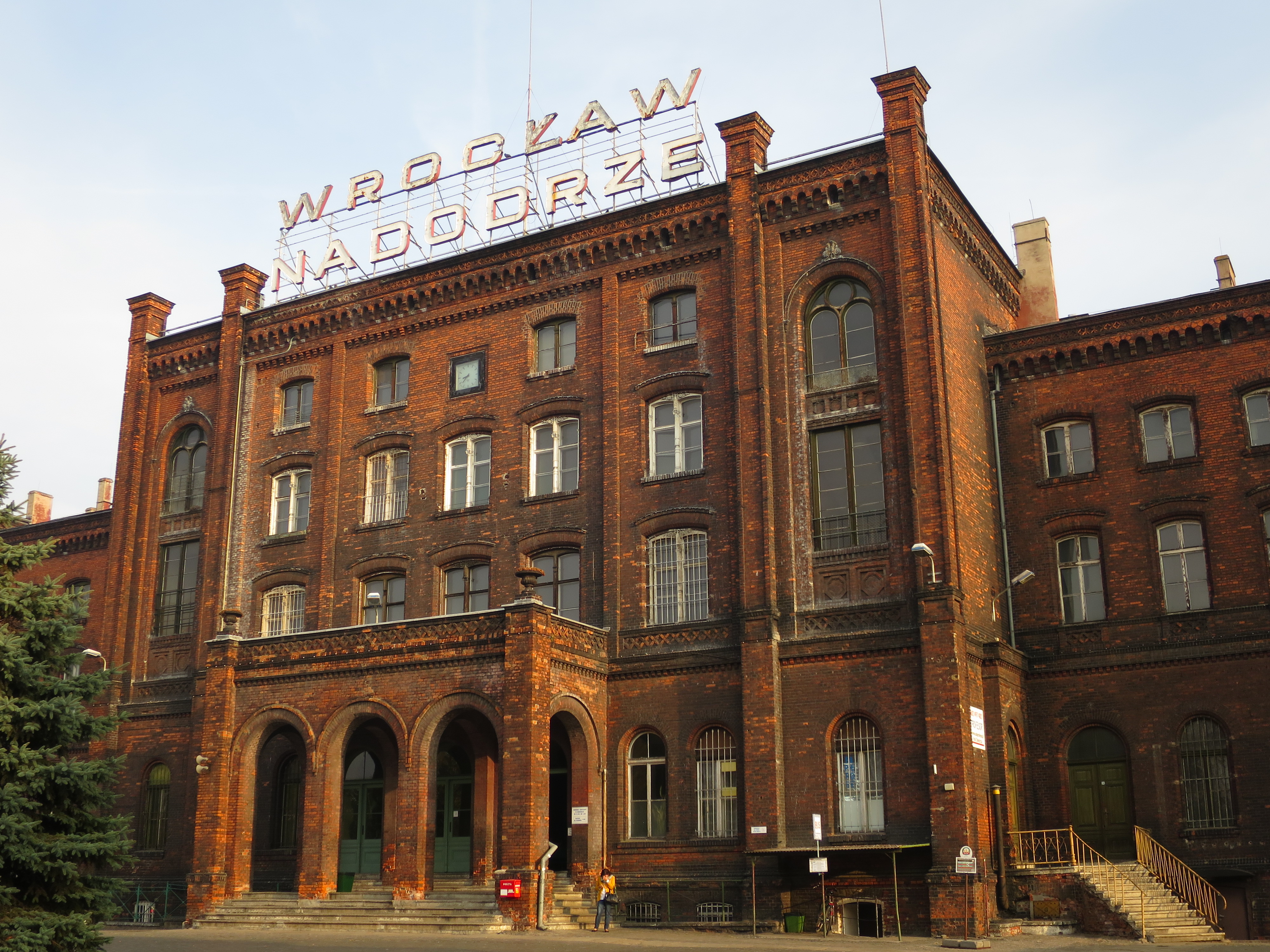
In 2017, Wrocław Nadodrze Station became the end of the line for city trains.

== Conditions of the Wrocław Metropolitan Railway ==
The Wrocław metropolitan railway, like any other, depends on various conditions, both central and local. Central factors include the financing of railway infrastructure development on interregional lines and its management, while local factors involve reliance on EU funding, the financial capacity of local governments, cooperation between business entities, and technical, spatial, and social conditions.

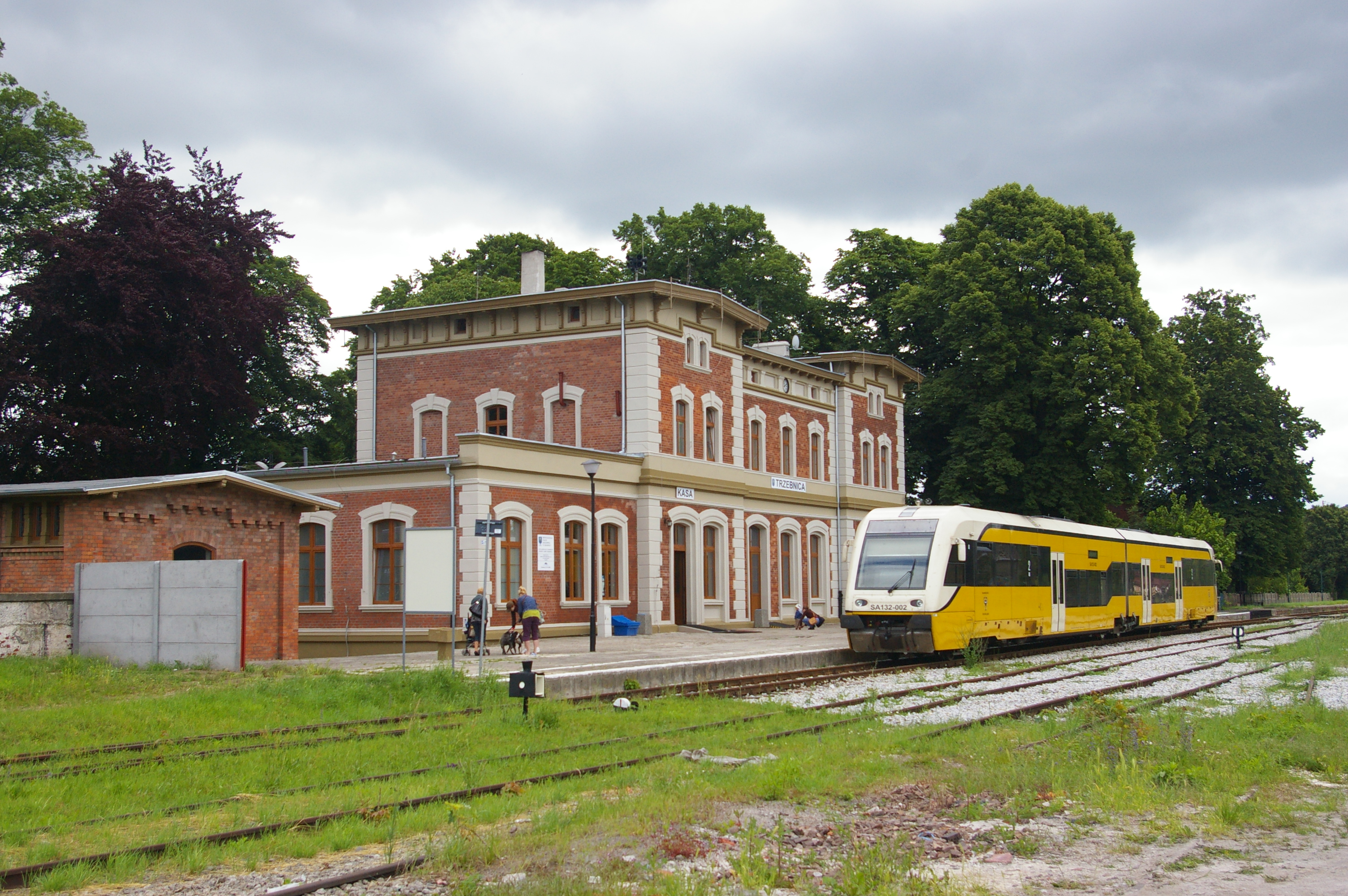
One of the first steps towards the metropolitan railway was the restoration of service on the Wrocław Psie Pole – Trzebnica line.

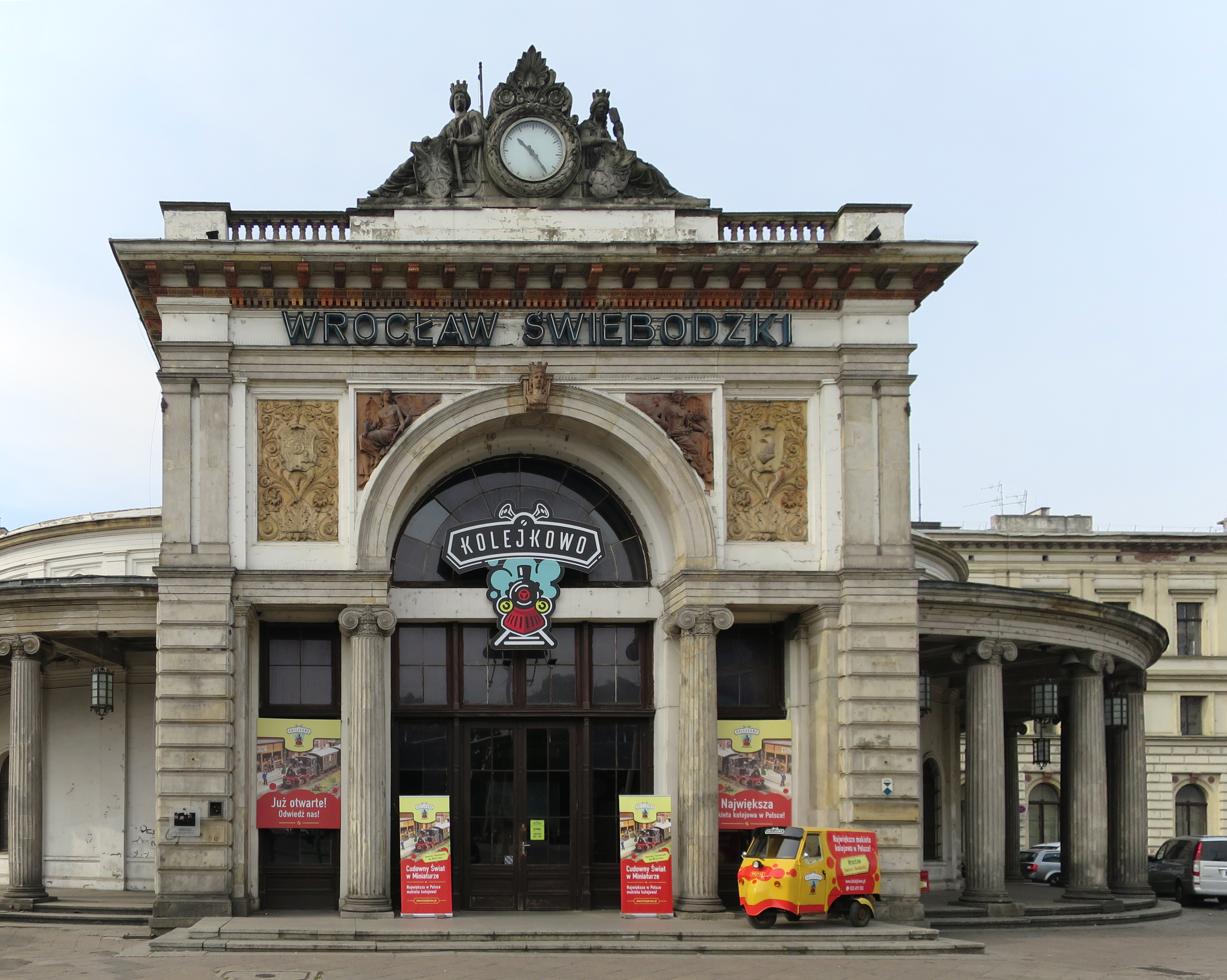
Wrocław Świebodzki Station is planned to be an important stop on the metropolitan railway.

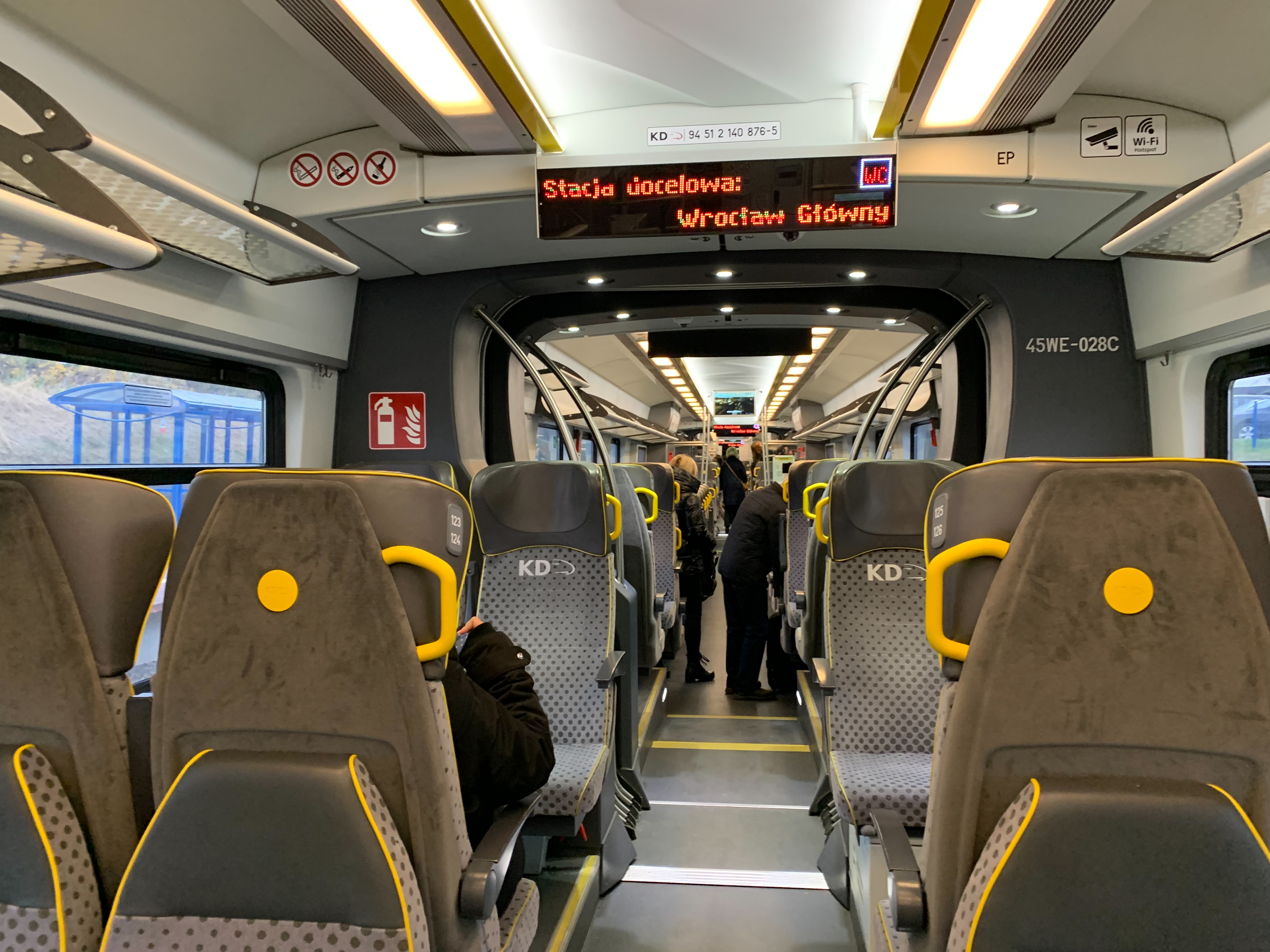
Interior of Lower Silesian Railways train.

=== Spatial ===
Both in Wrocław and in Lower Silesia, towns often developed independently of railway routes. The lack of connections is a major cause of difficulties, and in some cases even makes it impossible to use railway lines, especially for local traffic. In Wrocław alone, several railway stops would need to be built. Wrocław does not have a radial railway line; the railway is oriented away from the city center and larger residential areas. Wrocław Główny Station is located in the south, Wrocław Nadodrze in the north, Wrocław Mikołajów and Wrocław Kuźniki in the west, and the eastern part of the city only has access to the Wrocław Sołtysowice – Wrocław Wojnów line, which had not been used for passenger transport for 17 years. Although currently (2017) there are 23 stations and stops in Wrocław, they mostly cover peripheral districts and suburbs. Wrocław is a city without a cohesive transportation model, and suburban railway and bus lines do not complement each other.

=== Technical ===
The advantage of the Wrocław railway hub is its size and the density of railway lines, both national and local. Within Wrocław, the length of tracks used by regional trains is about 75 km, and the city is connected by lines in 11 directions, which is one of the best indicators in Poland. However, the Wrocław railway hub and the state of the railways in Lower Silesia have deteriorated over several decades; after 1989, sections to Świdnica via Sobótka, the Wrocław Psie Pole – Trzebnica line, and the northern line to Jelcz-Laskowice were closed. It was only in 2012 and beyond that repairs to tracks and infrastructure, including railway stations, were carried out. Despite this, there has been no significant improvement in train speeds or the capacity of the Wrocław hub. An additional limiting factor for railway development is the low capacity of the three-track viaduct connecting the main station with the Grabiszyn branch station. The technical condition of the infrastructure in the agglomeration is also insufficient. Additionally, there is still a shortage of rolling stock, though the situation is (2017) much better than in the early 21st century. In 2017, the highest number of trains in history ran on the province's tracks, with about 300 trains departing from Wrocław Główny on weekdays, also the highest in history.

=== Social ===
Wrocław is a city with high car traffic density, with approximately 560 cars per 1,000 residents. At the same time, the number of people in the city who rely on public and suburban transportation is decreasing, which is also related to the aging population and the shrinking percentage of older people who do not have a driver's license or a car. On the other hand, Wrocław's road infrastructure, especially in the city center, is inadequate, and the city suffers from traffic jams, leading to inefficiency in both individual and public transport, especially during rush hours. This has increased interest in railways as a means of transport independent of the road conditions in the city. Another important aspect is suburbanization, or the movement of residents from the city to the suburbs and towns within the broader metropolitan area, such as Pęgów, Mokronos Górny, or Ramiszów. Residents of many suburban areas have difficulty entering the city during rush hours, particularly in the eastern and southern parts. This is another factor driving the need for railway development as a means of passenger transport. As a result, the number of passengers on trains in the Lower Silesian province increased by 57% over four years.

=== Political ===
The operators of the Wrocław metropolitan railway are two entities: Lower Silesian Railways, a company owned by the Marshal of the Lower Silesian Voivodeship, and Polregio (formerly Przewozy Regionalne until 2016), which services lines to Oława, Strzelin, Oleśnica, Wołów, and partially to Żmigród. There are tensions between the Marshal and Polregio regarding the financing of transport in the agglomeration. The Marshal has 47 trains at his disposal (as of April 2017).

=== Administrative ===
An element of the transport organization system in Poland is the multitude of entities responsible for passenger transport. These entities are not interconnected and often compete with each other. There are also no shared entities ordering transportation, as is the case in countries like Germany. Such initiatives are still in the trial phase: the first was an agreement between 28 local governments on October 26, 2011, facilitated by the authorities of the Lower Silesian Voivodeship. The goal is to achieve functional, organizational, and financial integration of public collective transport in Wrocław and the surrounding agglomeration.

=== Financial ===
Public transport does not finance itself; it is funded by the central budget as well as local government budgets. As a result, many investments, especially infrastructure projects, must wait until the necessary funding becomes available. For this reason, a key line for the agglomeration, such as Wrocław – Oleśnica, is on the central reserve list. The level of funding in municipalities rarely exceeds 50% of costs. A chance for the development of the metropolitan railway has come from the possibility of European Union funding: with this money, local authorities are preparing both the infrastructure and rolling stock. For example, the purchase of rolling stock in 2016–2017 cost 258 million PLN, with 80% funded by the European Union under the Regional Operational Program.

== Infrastructure ==
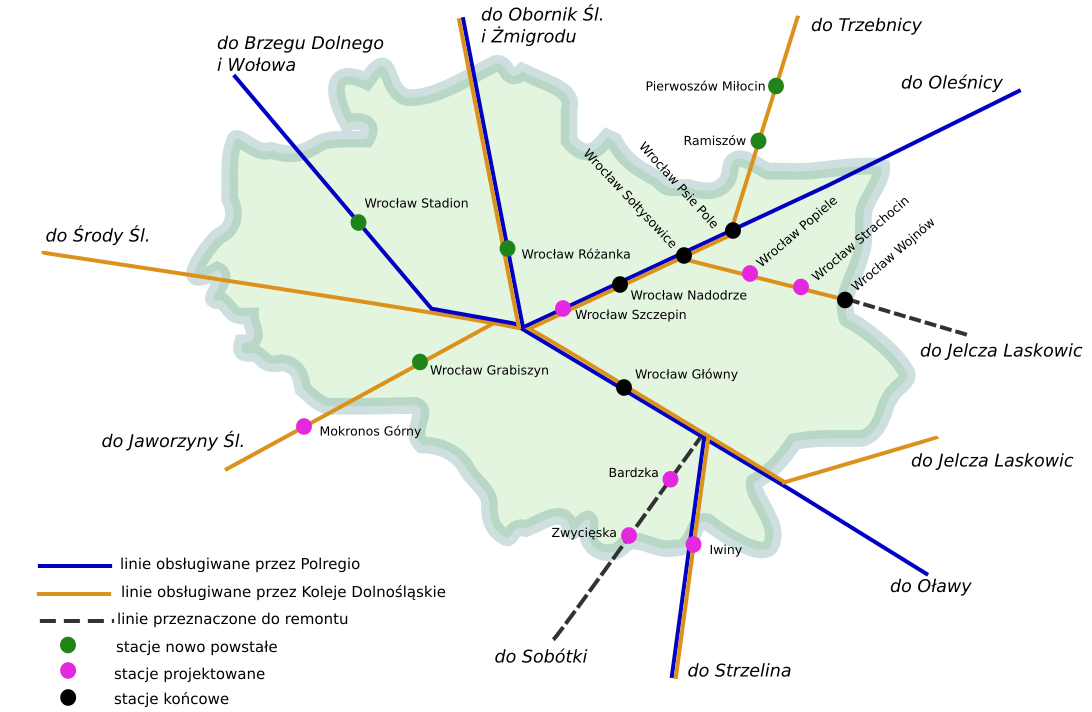
The state of the Wrocław railway hub in 2017 and its preparation for servicing the suburban railway.

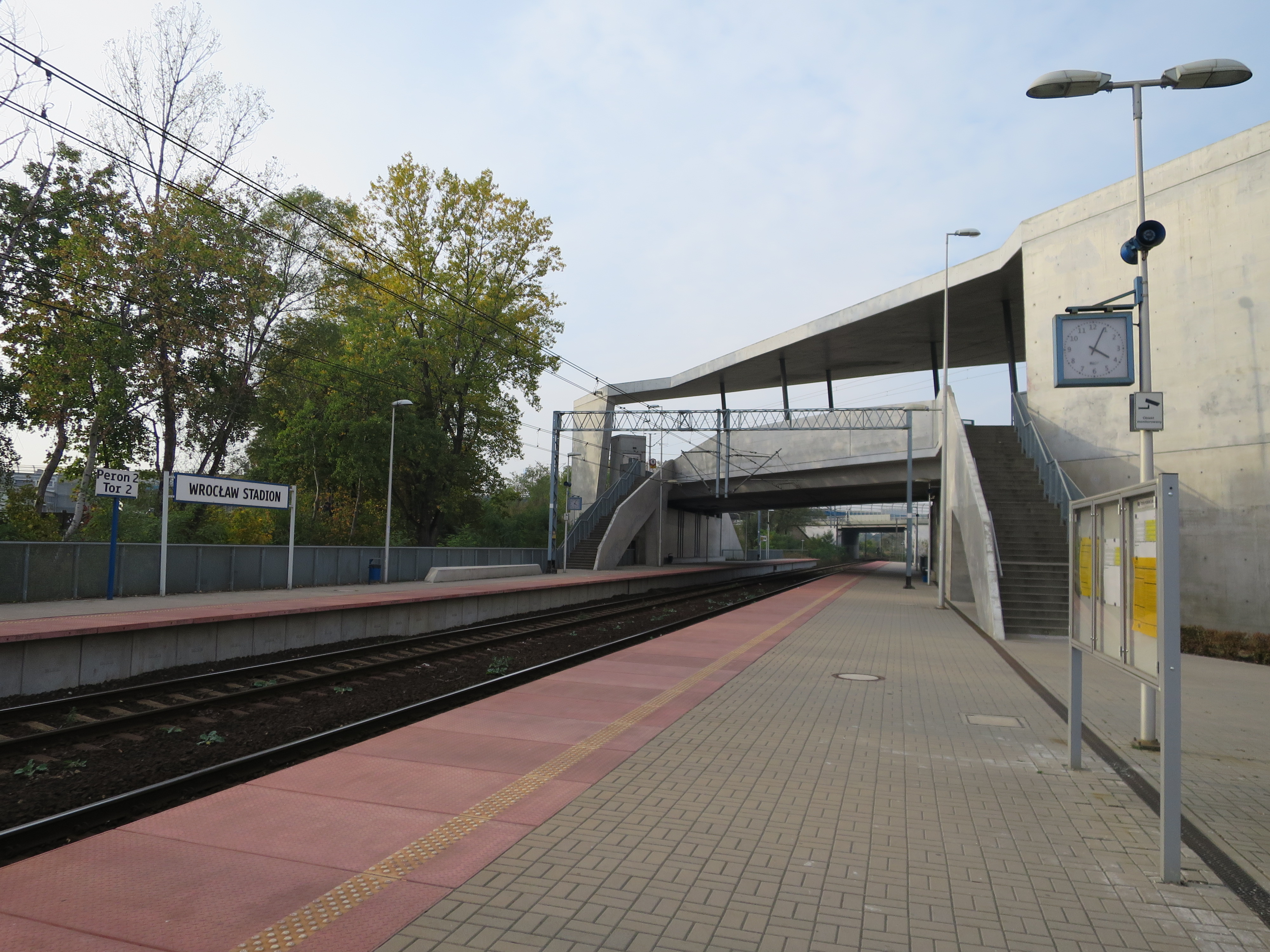
Wrocław Stadion, the first new station in the city opened in the 21st century, before the Euro 2012 championships.

=== Wrocław Agglomeration ===
A monocentric agglomeration in the Lower Silesian Voivodeship, with Wrocław as its central hub. Surrounding it are satellite cities: Trzebnica, Oleśnica, Jelcz-Laskowice, Siechnice, Oława, Strzelin, Sobótka, Kąty Wrocławskie, Środa Śląska, Brzeg Dolny, Wołów, Oborniki Śląskie, and Żmigród. The agglomeration is not clearly defined and does not have formally established boundaries. It has a well-developed road network, including two highways: A4 and the Wrocław Bypass, the S8 expressway, and a dense network of railway lines, including those that are part of national routes. The area of the agglomeration, estimated at about 4,000 km², is home to over one million residents.

=== Wrocław ===
Wrocław is a city of over half a million people in the southwest of Poland, the capital of the Lower Silesian Voivodeship. A city with a history spanning over a thousand years, it was damaged during World War II but has a relatively compact historic center and a number of peripheral housing estates built after the war. The city is surrounded by a dense and still developing network of trams and buses. Wrocław has four major railway stations: Wrocław Główny, Wrocław Mikołajów, which

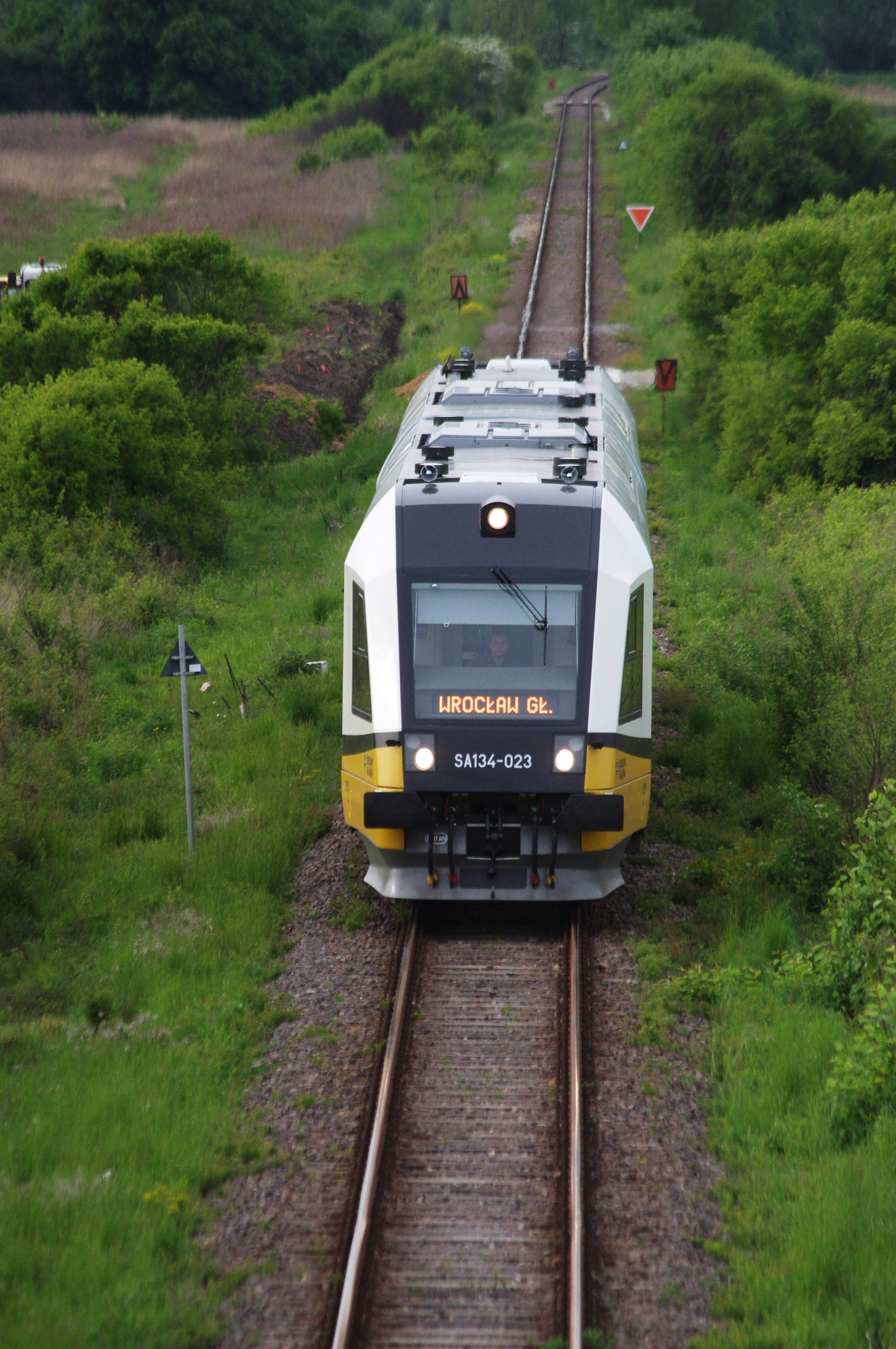
A Lower Silesian Railways train on the Trzebnica – Wrocław route.

serves large estates in the western part of the city, Wrocław Nadodrze, and Wrocław Świebodzki, which is currently closed to railway traffic but is included in future plans, including the Kolej Plus program. The city offers job and educational opportunities attractive to both its residents and newcomers, including those living in the agglomeration; the unemployment rate is 3.5%, one of the lowest in the country. For several years, Wrocław has been experiencing suburbanization, with residents moving to towns located near the city, while the population of the agglomeration remains stable.

=== Railway Infrastructure ===
The Wrocław Agglomeration Railway is divided into two zones:

- The large Wrocław agglomeration, which is the area bounded by the stations: Strzelin, Jaworzyna Śląska, Malczyce, Wołów, Żmigród, Oleśnica, Oleśnica Rataje, Jelcz Laskowice, Oława, and Trzebnica;
- The small Wrocław agglomeration, which refers to the area within the administrative boundaries of the city, bounded by the stations: Wrocław Brochów, Wrocław Zachodni, Wrocław Leśnica, Wrocław Pracze, Wrocław Świniary, and Wrocław Psie Pole.

As of 2017:

- The total length of railway lines in the large agglomeration – 369.5 km
- The length of active railway lines in the large agglomeration – 369.5 km
- The number of stations and stops in the large agglomeration – 77
- The number of active stations and stops in the large agglomeration – 70
- The number of stations and stops in the small agglomeration – 26
- The number of active stations and stops in the small agglomeration – 23

Most of the agglomeration’s railway lines are double-track and electrified. The railway lines Wrocław – Kobierzyce and Wrocław Psie Pole – Trzebnica lack overhead electrification. These sections are also single-track. The line from Sołtysowice to Jelcz is also single-track, as are short sections of the Wrocław Brochów – Jelcz-Laskowice and Wrocław – Wołów line. The vast majority of the infrastructure is used for passenger transport, with the exception of the freight bypass connecting the line from Katowice to the west of the country, passing through the southern districts of the city, the line from Osobowice to Sołtysowice, and the section from Wrocław Świebodzki to the Grabiszyn branch post.

== Passenger traffic service ==
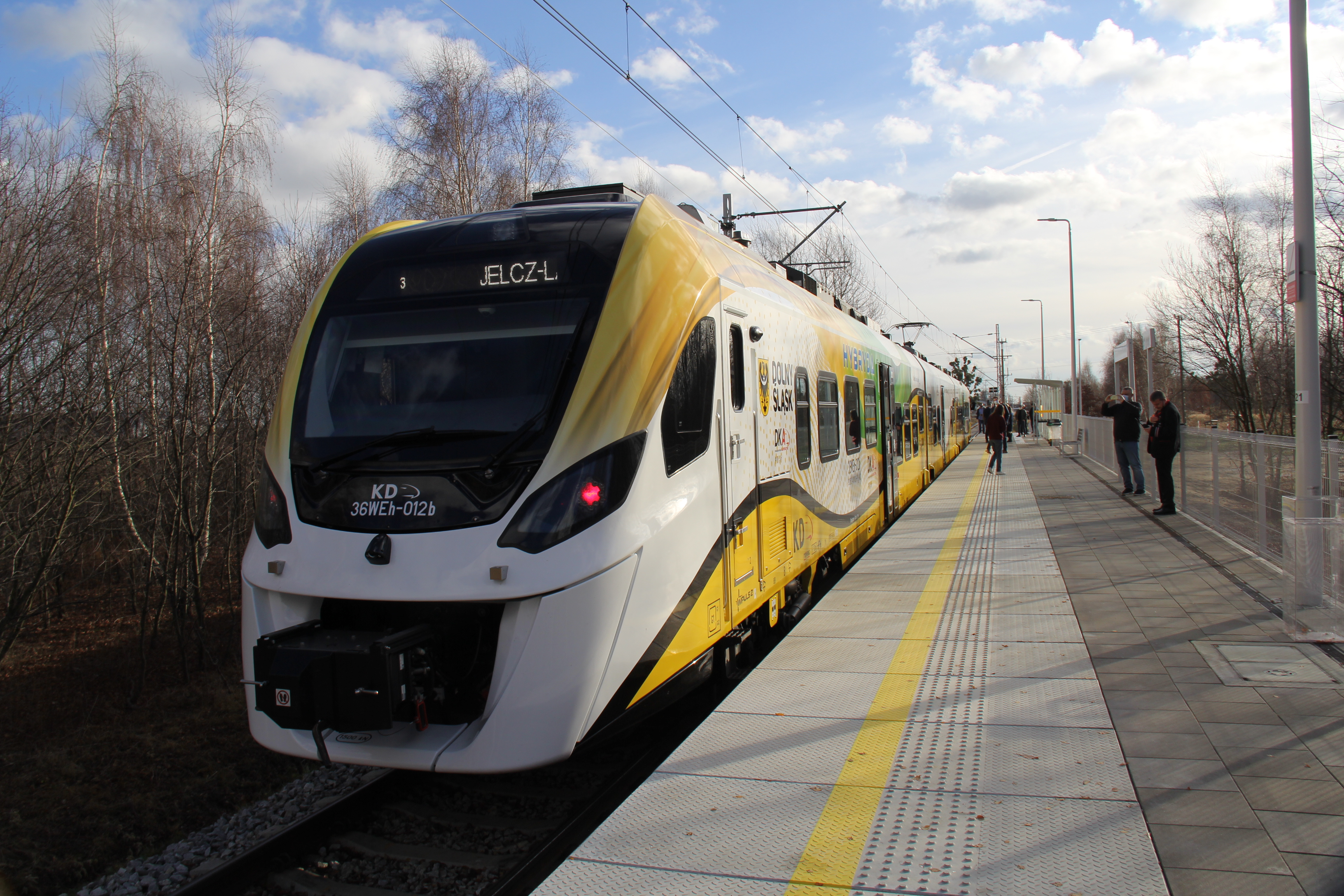
Impuls train at Wrocław Wojnów Wschodni station.

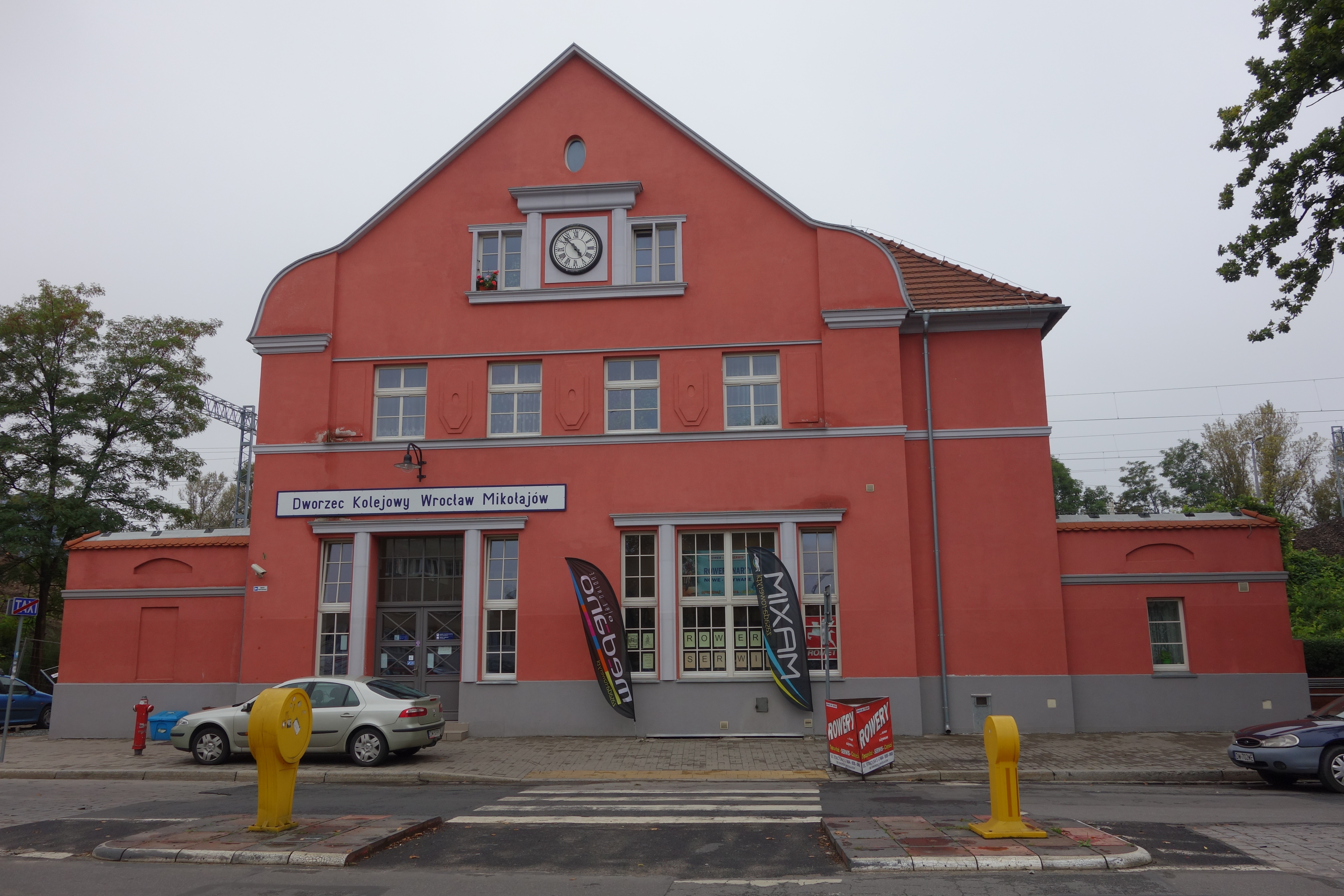
Wroclaw Mikołajów railway station serves the most, as many as 4 agglomeration lines.

Passenger rail services in the Wrocław agglomeration are operated by Polregio (POLREGIO sp. z o.o. Dolnośląski Branch in Wrocław), Lower Silesian Railways – a company owned by the Lower Silesian Voivodeship Marshal, and the Road and City Maintenance Board in Wrocław based on the so-called integrated ticket system. Trains operate in ten directions within the agglomeration, with a frequency of at least 12 trips per day in each direction, including increased frequencies during the morning and afternoon peak hours; on most routes, there is at least one night connection (around 11:00 PM). Passengers mainly travel within the agglomeration, but more often choose routes within the administrative boundaries of Wrocław; in 2019, this amounted to over 4 million passengers, and the number is on the rise. As a result, the city of Wrocław is increasingly subsidizing services in the region, spending 18 million PLN on transport services in 2019. Among the stations in the agglomeration, those in Wrocław are the most popular, occupying three of the top four places. One of the most challenging routes to operate is the Wrocław – Trzebnica line, due to the lack of electrification and the single track.

=== Frequency of connections in the Wrocław agglomeration ===
As of 2022. The number of daily departures from Wrocław Główny station (for trains to Jelcz via the northern route – Wrocław Nadodrze) is provided in parentheses, comparing to the number of departures on the same route in 2001 on weekdays. Table numbering is consistent with the Lower Silesian Train Timetable.

Line	Schedule number	Section	Number of trains on weekdays	Number of trains during morning rush hours (5:00 – 9:00)	Number of trains during afternoon rush hours (14:00 – 18:00)
D1	260	Wrocław – Malczyce	32 (11)	6 (3)	6 (3)
D2	265	Wrocław – Wołów	24 (10)	5 (3)	6 (3)
D3	280	Wrocław – Żmigród	21 (11)	5 (3)	6 (3)
D4	223	Wrocław – Świdnica Miasto	11 (4) (By June 30, 2000)	3 (1)	3 (1)
D5	220	Wrocław – Oława	27 (9)	6 (2)	6 (2)
D6	240	Wrocław – Kąty Wrocławskie – (Jaworzyna Śląska)	30 (13)	6 (2)	8 (4)
D7	215	Wrocław – Jelcz-Laskowice	17 (9)	5 (3)	6 (2)
D70 DKA 1	205	Wrocław – Jelcz Miłoszyce	15 (2)	3 (0)	3 (1)
D8	204	Wrocław – Trzebnica	16 (0)	4 (0)	4 (0)
D80	200	Wrocław – Oleśnica	20 (12)	7 (3)	7 (4)
D9	230	Wrocław – Strzelin	16 (8)	5 (2)	6 (3)

=== Daily traffic at stations of the Wrocław agglomeration railway ===
The table below shows the number of people using suburban trains at stations with a daily turnover of more than 1,000 passengers in 2018 and 2022.

Rank	Name	Passengers exchanged 2018	Passengers exchanged 2022
1	Wrocław Główny	58000	72300
2	Wrocław Mikołajów	3000	4200
3	Oborniki Śląskie	2700	2400
4	Żmigród	2100	2100
5	Strzelin	2000	2300
	Oława	2000	2900
7	Wrocław Leśnica	1900	1200
	Brzeg Dolny	1900	2000
9	Jelcz-Laskowice	1700	1600
	Oleśnica	1700	3100
11	Wołów	1600	1800
12	Wrocław Świniary	1300	100-149
13	Trzebnica	1200	1300
	Wrocław Brochów	1200	500-699
15	Kąty Wrocławskie	1100	1900

Other larger centers of the agglomeration (2017): Środa Śląska 700 – 999, Malczyce 700 – 999, Siechnice 500 – 699, Twardogóra 200 – 299.

== Lines of Lower Silesian Agglomeration Railways ==
=== DKA 1 ===
Opened for use as the first line in the planned Lower Silesian Agglomeration Railways on December 12, 2021, and designated as DKA1 (according to Lower Silesian Railways numbering D70). Initially, the line was planned to open in September 2022 due to a shortage of rolling stock, but after protests from residents of the Wojnów, Swojczyce, and Strachocin neighborhoods at the Wrocław Main Station, it was decided to accelerate the opening in a limited capacity in December 2021. At the time of the opening, the line was serviced by 7 pairs of trains operated by Lower Silesian Railways. A significant increase in service, to 15 pairs of trains per day, occurred on October 3, 2022. The line is predominantly serviced by Lower Silesian Railways. Since August 18, 2022, the line has been operated by modern Elf 2 trains
