= Wrocław Główny railway station =

Railway station in Wrocław, Poland

Wrocław Główny Wrocław Main
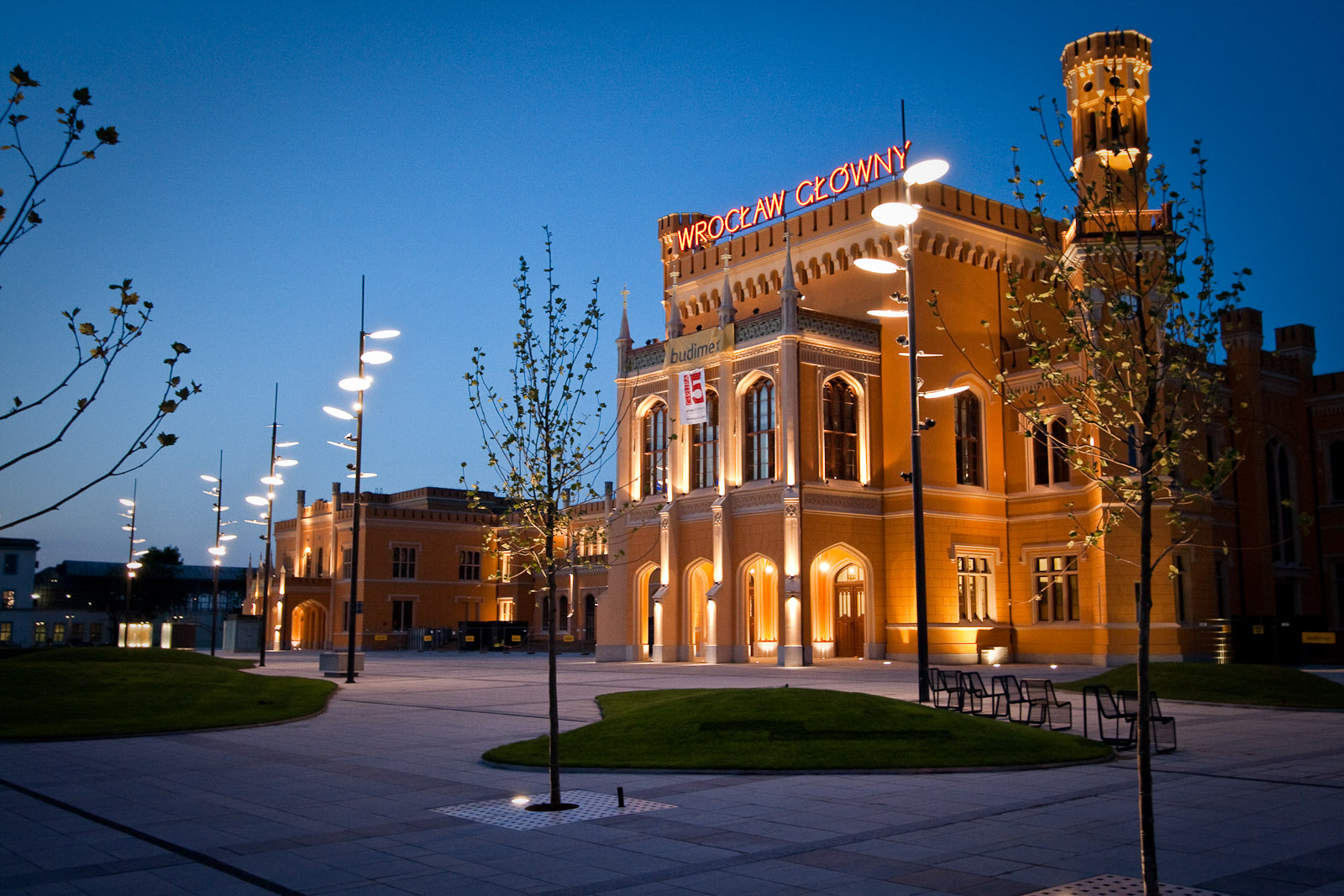
- Station building

General information
- Location: Przedmieście Świdnickie/Huby, Wrocław; Poland
- Coordinates: 51.0988°N 17.0365°E
- Owner: Polish State Railways (station building); PKP Polskie Linie Kolejowe (infrastructure)
- Lines: Bytom–Wrocław railway; Wrocław–Poznań railway; Wrocław–Szczecin railway; Wrocław–Międzylesie railway; Wrocław–Jedlina-Zdrój railway
- Platforms: 6
- Tracks: 11
- Train operators: PKP Intercity; Lower Silesian Railways; Polregio
- Connections: Trams: 0, 2, 4, 5, 8, 9, 15, 18, 21, 22, 23; Buses: A, K, N, 106, 110, 112, 113, 114, 120, 122, 125, 145, 146, 148, 206, 240, 241, 242, 243, 244, 245, 246, 247, 248, 249, 250, 251, 253, 255, 257, 259, 325, 602

Construction
- Architect: Wilhelm Grapow
- Architectural style: Gothic and Tudor Revival

Other information
- Website: pkp.pl/pl/dworce

History
- Opened: 12 October 1857; 169 years ago
- Former names: Breslau Oberschlesischer Bahnhof (1857–1904); Breslau Hauptbahnhof (1904–1945)

Passengers
- 2021: ▲17.1 million
- Rank: 1st in Poland
- 2022: ▲26.4 million
- Rank: 1st in Poland
- 2023: ▲29.4 million
- Rank: 1st in Poland
- 2024: ▼28.78 million
- Rank: 1st in Poland
- 2025: ▼28.37 million
- Rank: 3rd in Poland
Location
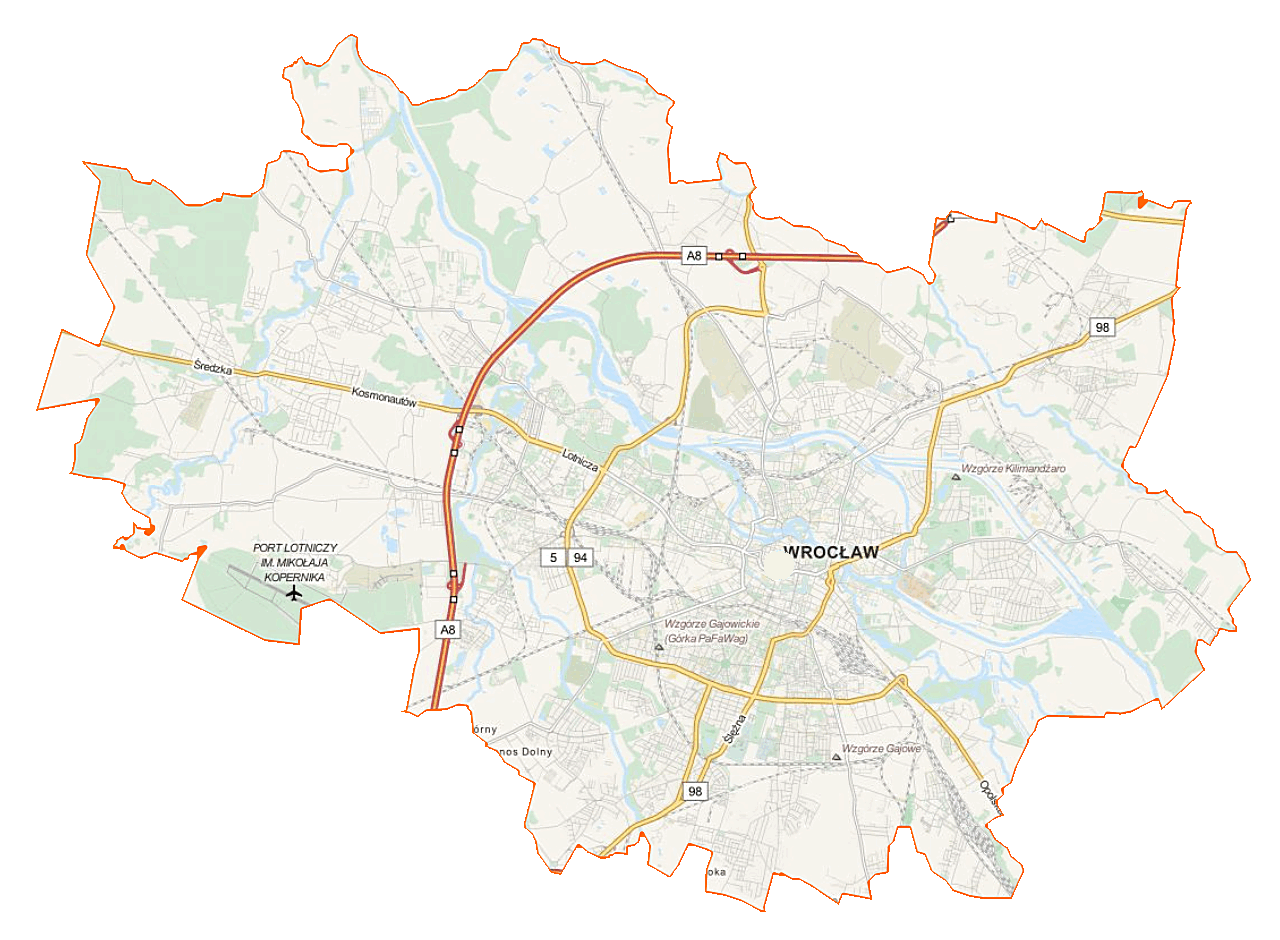
- Location within Poland Location within Lower Silesian Voivodeship Location within Wrocław

Wrocław Główny is the largest and most important passenger train station in the city of Wrocław, in southwestern Poland. Situated at the junction of several important routes, it is the largest railway station in the Lower Silesia Voivodeship, as well as in Poland in terms of the number of passengers serviced. It replaced Wrocław Górnośląski railway station.

In 2018, the station served over 21.2 million passengers. In 2023, it served 29.4 million passengers, making it the country's busiest railway station.

== Structure ==
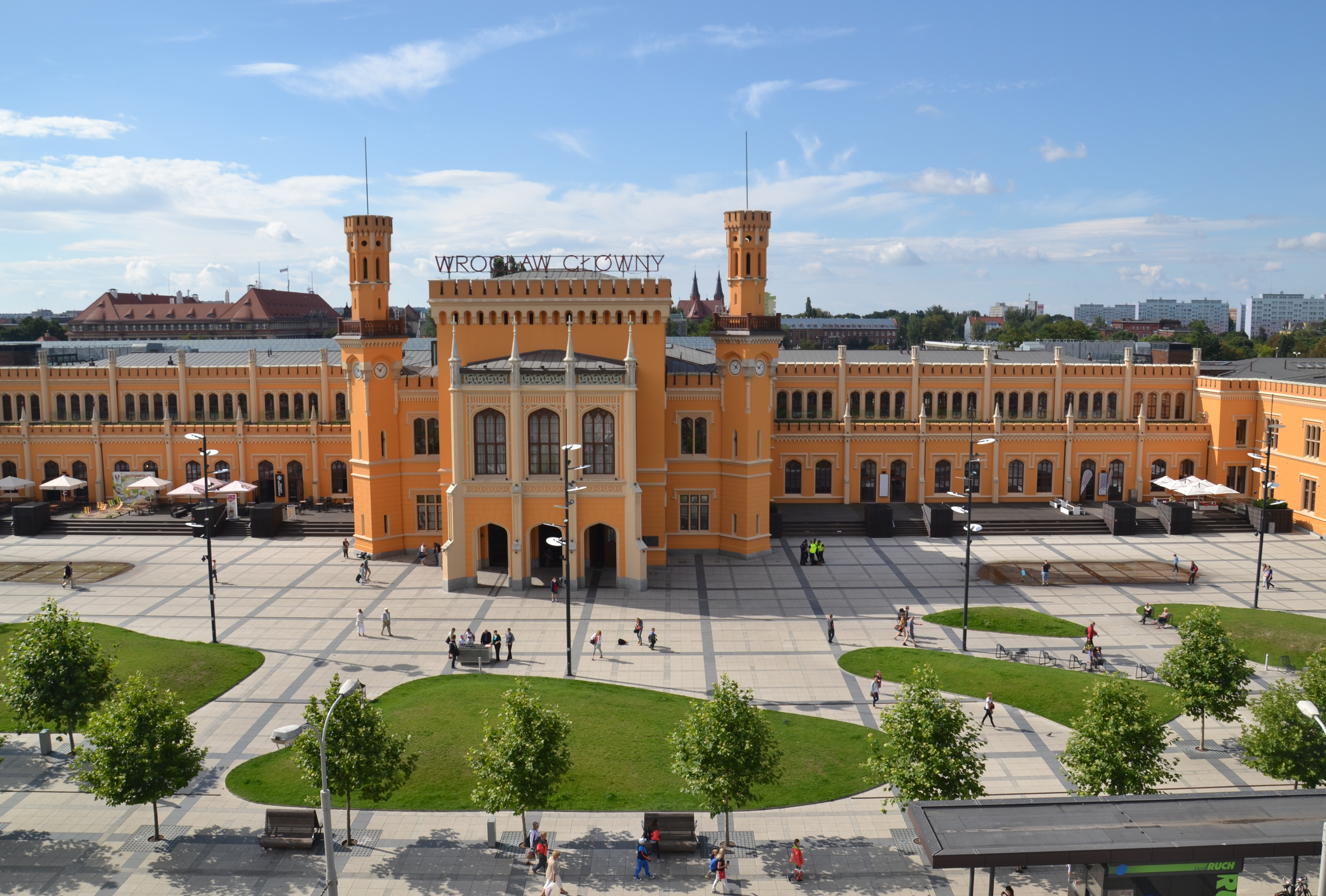
Railway station square

The main gate is located north of the station, on Piłsudski street (Polish: ulica Piłsudskiego), with two additional entrances located at either end of the main hall. The back gate is located on the far side of the tracks, in the south facing Sucha street. The station has six parallel platforms (platforms I through IV with two tracks, platform V with one track and one short one, platform VI with one track). Each has two subway exits, which lead to the main hall. Since all platforms and tracks are above the street level, the tunnels are located at the same level as outside pavements.

== History ==
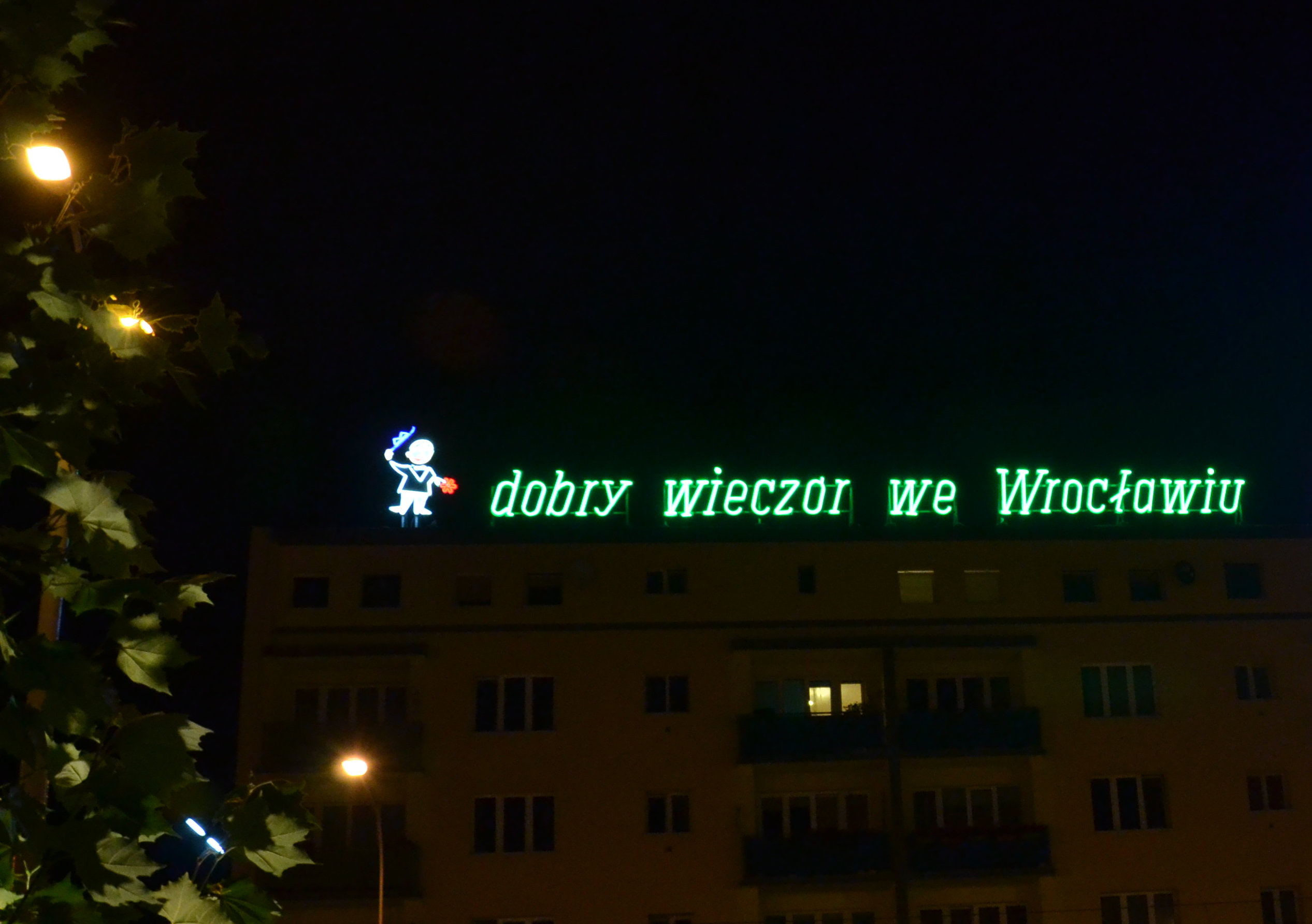
Dobry wieczór we Wrocławiu (Good evening in Wrocław) neon in front of the station (designed in 1960)

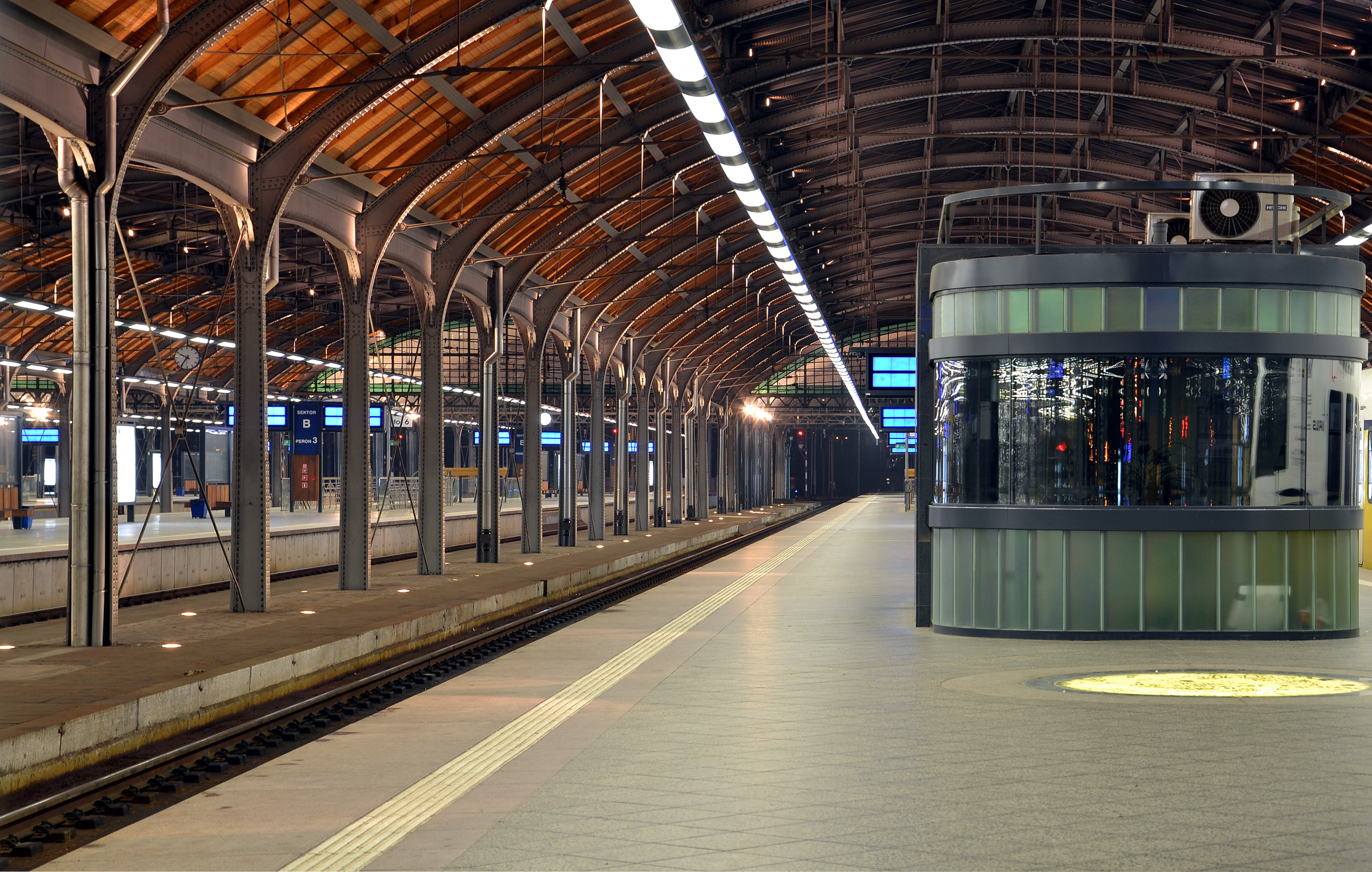
The interior of the station

The station was built in 1855–1857, as the starting point of the Oberschlesische Eisenbahn (Upper Silesian Railway), as well as the line from Breslau to Glogau via Posen. It replaced the earlier complex of Wrocław Górnośląski (built 1841–1842). Its designer was the royal Prussian architect Wilhelm Grapow, and in the mid-19th century, it was located near the southern outskirts of the city, as the areas to the south had not yet been urbanized.

The original concourse was located where the passenger hall now is and was adjacent to the station yard. When construction finished in the mid-19th century, the station only had one platform, but the platform hall was some 200 meters long, and it was regarded as one of the biggest structures of this kind in Europe. By the entrances were luggage lockers, telephone, and telegraph facilities. In the station complex were a restaurant and three waiting rooms (1st, 2nd, and 3rd class). There was also a special room and a separate hallway for VIPs.

In the late 19th century, when the government of the German Empire heavily invested in railway construction, the station was extended. Prices of real estate around the station grew, as the city began to develop southwards. In 1899, the construction of five new platforms began, four of them covered by a large roof. The number of passenger platforms within the station grew to 13 and all were elevated. The façade of the main hall was remodeled in 1899–1904.

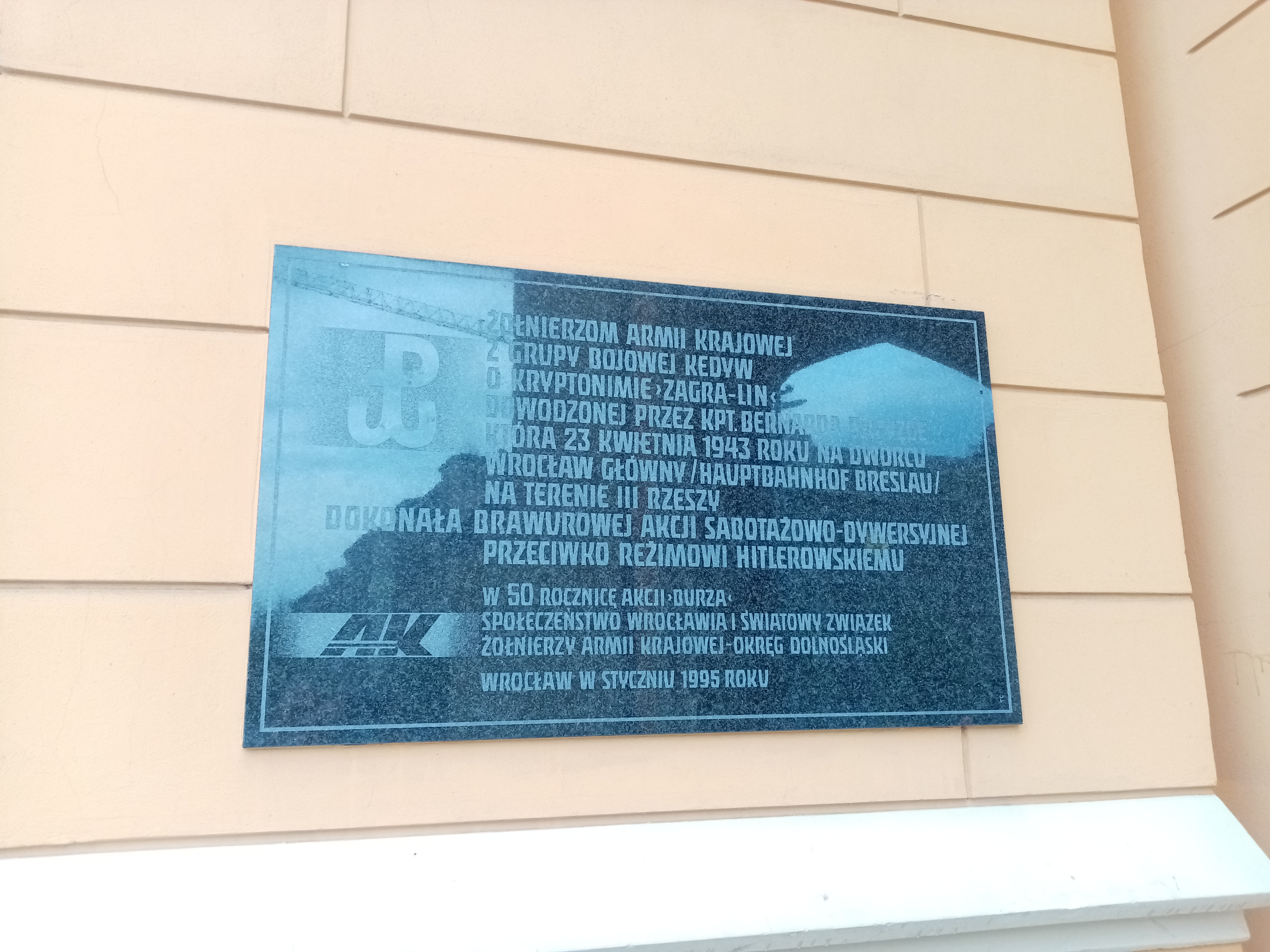
A plaque commemorating a sabotage operation carried out by Zagra-Lin in 1943

During World War II, Polish resistance from the group Zagra-Lin successfully attacked a Nazi troop transport on the station on 23 April 1943. A commemorative plate honoring their actions was placed after Nazi Germany was defeated and the city was incorporated into Poland.

On 8 January 1967, the popular Polish actor Zbigniew Cybulski died on platform 3. Cybulski was trying to jump into a train that was already departing, but fell instead under its wheels. On the 30th anniversary of this event, Andrzej Wajda unveiled a plaque on the platform in memory of Cybulski.

In 2010–2012 the station was extensively refurbished for the Euro 2012 championships.

In 2025, the US-based lobby organization Consumer Choice Center ranked Wrocław Główny second place on its “European Railway Station Index”, ahead of Bern and Berlin but behind Zürich.

== Train services ==
Train services are operated by PKP Intercity, Polregio and Lower Silesian Railways.

Until mid-December 2014 the station was also served by EuroCity "Wawel", which used to run once daily between Berlin Hauptbahnhof and Wrocław Główny, formerly even further to Kraków Główny. The service has been re-established since 2020, now extending further East to Przemyśl near the Ukrainian border.

=== Long Distance International ===
- NJ ÖBB Nightjet Berlin-Charlottenburg – Berlin Hbf – Berlin Ostbahnhof – Frankfurt (Oder) – Wrocław Główny – Ostrava – Vienna (One train pair daily)
- EN Berlin Hbf – Wroclaw Glowny – Budapest-Keleti
- LEO Praha hl. n. – Pardubice – Wrocław – Friday, Saturday, Sunday
- EuroCity services (EC) (EC 95 by DB) (IC by PKP) Berlin - Frankfurt (Oder) - Rzepin - Wrocław – Katowice – Kraków – Rzeszów – Przemyśl

Preceding station	Leo Express	Following station
Katowice towards Praha hl.n.	Leo Express	Terminus

=== Domestic Passenger Services ===
The station is served by the following service(s):

- Express Intercity Premium services (EIP) Warsaw - Wrocław
- Express Intercity services (EIC) Warsaw - Wrocław
- Intercity services (IC) Wrocław- Opole - Częstochowa - Warszawa
- Intercity services (IC) Wrocław - Ostrów Wielkopolski - Łódź - Warszawa
- Intercity services (IC) Zgorzelec - Legnica - Wrocław - Ostrów Wielkopolski - Łódź - Warszawa
- Intercity services (IC) Białystok - Warszawa - Częstochowa - Opole - Wrocław
- Intercity services (IC) Białystok - Warszawa - Łódź - Ostrów Wielkopolski - Wrocław
- Intercity services (IC) Ełk - Białystok - Warszawa - Łódź - Ostrów Wielkopolski - Wrocław
- Intercity services (IC) Zielona Góra - Wrocław - Opele - Częstochowa - Kraków - Rzeszów - Przemyśl
- Intercity services (IC) Swinoujscie - Szczecin - Kostrzyn - Rzepin - Zielona Gora - Wroclaw - Katowice - Kraków
- Intercity services (IC) Ustka - Koszalin - Poznań - Wrocław - Opole - Bielsko-Biała
- Intercity services (IC) Bydgoszcz - Poznań - Leszno - Wrocław - Opole - Rybnik - Bielsko-Biała - Zakopane
- Intercity services (TLK) Lublin Główny — Świnoujście
- Regional services (PR) Wrocław - Głogów - Zielona Góra Główna
- Regional services (PR) Wrocław Główny - Leszno - Poznań Główny
- Regional services (PR) Wrocław Główny - Strzelin - Ziębice
- Regional services (PR) Wrocław Główny - Jelenia Góra - Szklarska Poręba Górna
- Regional services (PR) Wrocław - Oleśnica - Ostrów Wielkopolski
- Regional services (PR) Wrocław Główny - Oleśnica - Kluczbork
- Regional service (PR) Wrocław - Oleśnica - Kluczbork - Lubliniec
- Regional services (PR) Wrocław Główny - Oława - Brzeg
- Regional services (PR) Wrocław Główny - Oława - Brzeg - Nysa
- Regional service (PR) Wrocław - Oława - Brzeg - Nysa - Kędzierzyn-Koźle
- Regional services (PR) Wrocław Główny - Oława - Brzeg - Opole Główne
- Regional service (PR) Wrocław - Oława - Brzeg - Opole Główne - Kędzierzyn-Koźle
- Regional service (PR) Wrocław - Oława - Brzeg - Opole Główne - Kędzierzyn-Koźle - Racibórz
- Regional service (PR) Wrocław - Oława - Brzeg - Opole Główne - Gliwice
- Regional services (PR) Wrocław Główny - Jelcz-Laskowice

Preceding station	PKP Intercity	Following station
Legnica towards Berlin Hbf	EuroCity EC 95; IC	Opole Główne towards Przemyśl Główny
Brzeg towards Warszawa Wschodnia	EIP	Terminus
Opole Główne towards Warszawa Wschodnia	EIC	Terminus
Oława towards Warszawa Gdańska or Warszawa Wschodnia	IC Via Częstochowa	Terminus
Oława towards Białystok	IC Via Częstochowa	Terminus
Wrocław Mikołajów towards Białystok	IC Via Łódź	Terminus
Wrocław Mikołajów towards Ełk	IC	Terminus
Wrocław Mikołajów towards Warszawa Wschodnia	IC	Wrocław Leśnica towards Zgorzelec
Legnica towards Zielona Góra Główna	IC	Oława towards Przemyśl Główny
Legnica towards Świnoujście	IC	Oława towards Kraków Główny
Wrocław Mikołajów towards Ustka	IC	Oława towards Bielsko-Biała Główna
Wrocław Mikołajów towards Bydgoszcz Główna	IC	Oława towards Zakopane
Wrocław Leśnica towards Świnoujście	TLK	Oława towards Lublin Główny
Preceding station	Polregio	Following station
Wrocław Mikołajów towards Poznań Główny	PR	Terminus
Wrocław Muchobór towards Zielona Góra Główna	PR	Terminus
Iwiny towards Ziębice	PR	Terminus
Wrocław Grabiszyn towards Szklarska Poręba Górna	PR	Terminus
Terminus	PR	Wrocław Mikołajów towards Ostrów Wielkopolski
Terminus	PR	Wrocław Mikołajów towards Kluczbork or Lubliniec
Terminus	PR	Wrocław Brochów towards Brzeg, Nysa, Opole Główne, Kędzierzyn-Koźle, Racibórz or Gliwice
Terminus	PR	Wrocław Brochów towards Jelcz-Laskowice
Preceding station	KD	Following station
Terminus	D1	Wrocław Muchobór towards Lubań Śląski
Terminus	D3	Wrocław Mikołajów towards Rawicz
Terminus	D6	Wrocław Grabiszyn towards Jelenia Góra
Wrocław Brochów towards Jelcz-Laskowice	D7	Wrocław Mikołajów towards Krotoszyn
Terminus	D8	Wrocław Mikołajów towards Trzebnica
Terminus	D9	Iwiny towards Lichkov
Terminus	D10	Wrocław Muchobór towards Dresden Hauptbahnhof
Terminus	D11	Wrocław Muchobór towards Głogów
Terminus	D16	Wrocław Grabiszyn towards Dzierżoniów Śląski
Terminus	D14	Wrocław Muchobór towards Forst (Lausitz)
Terminus	D28	Wrocław Grabiszyn towards Adršpach
Terminus	D29	Smardzów Wrocławski towards Kudowa-Zdrój
Terminus	D99	Legnica towards Berlin-Lichtenberg

Preceding station	Leo Express	Following station
Terminus	Leo Express	Lichkov toward Praha hlavní nádraží

== Gallery ==
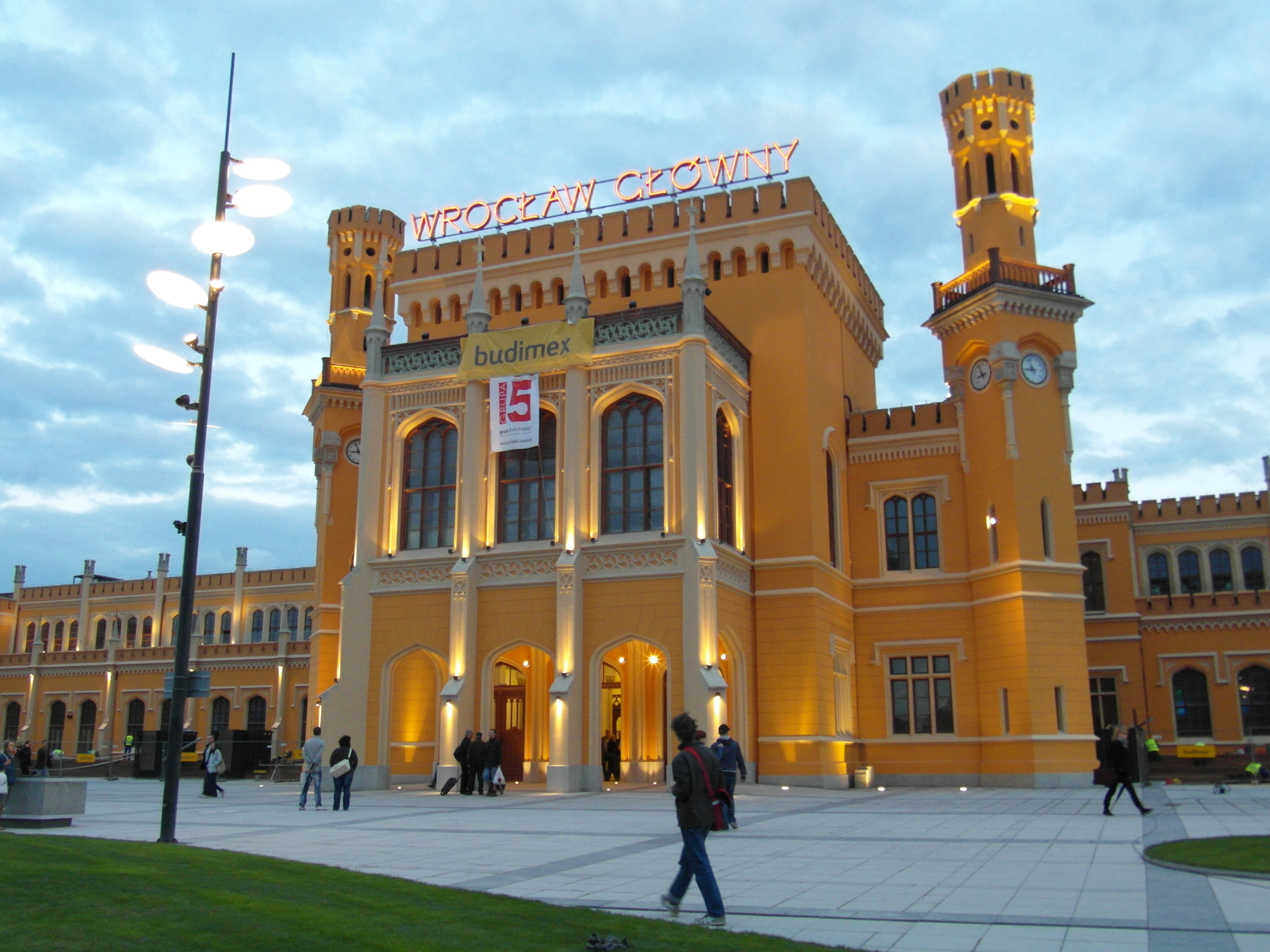
Front view

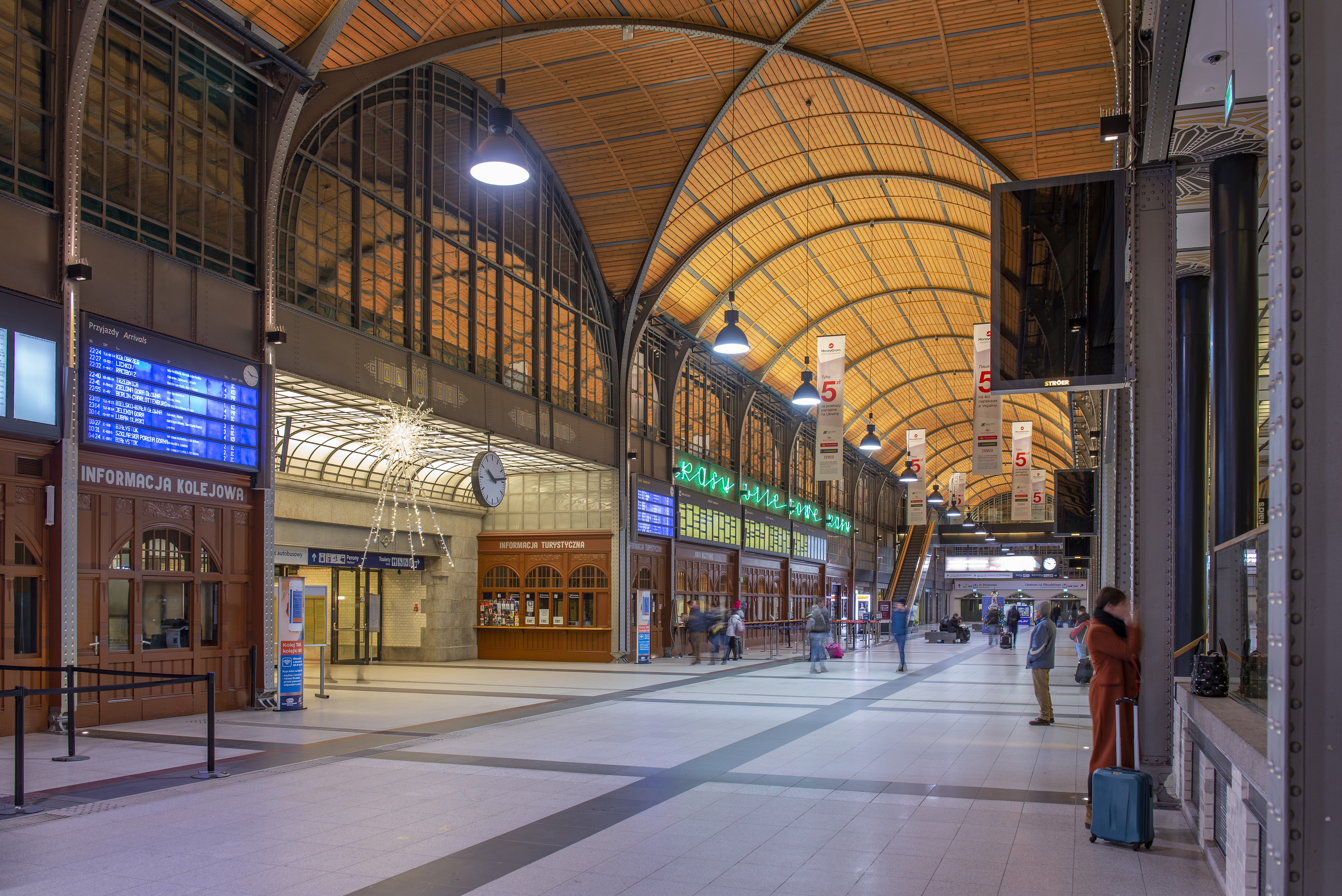
Main Hall of the station

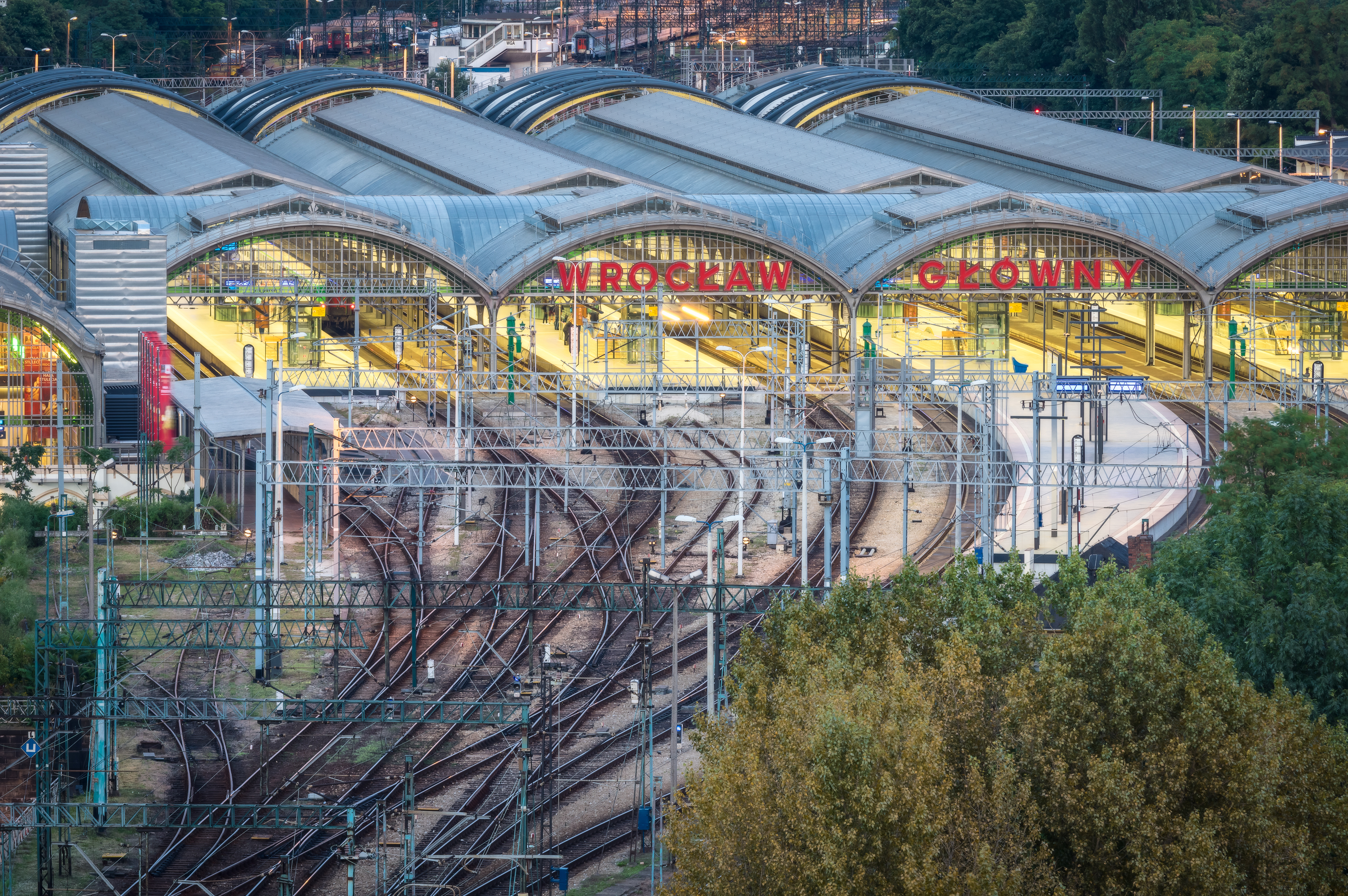
Aerial view

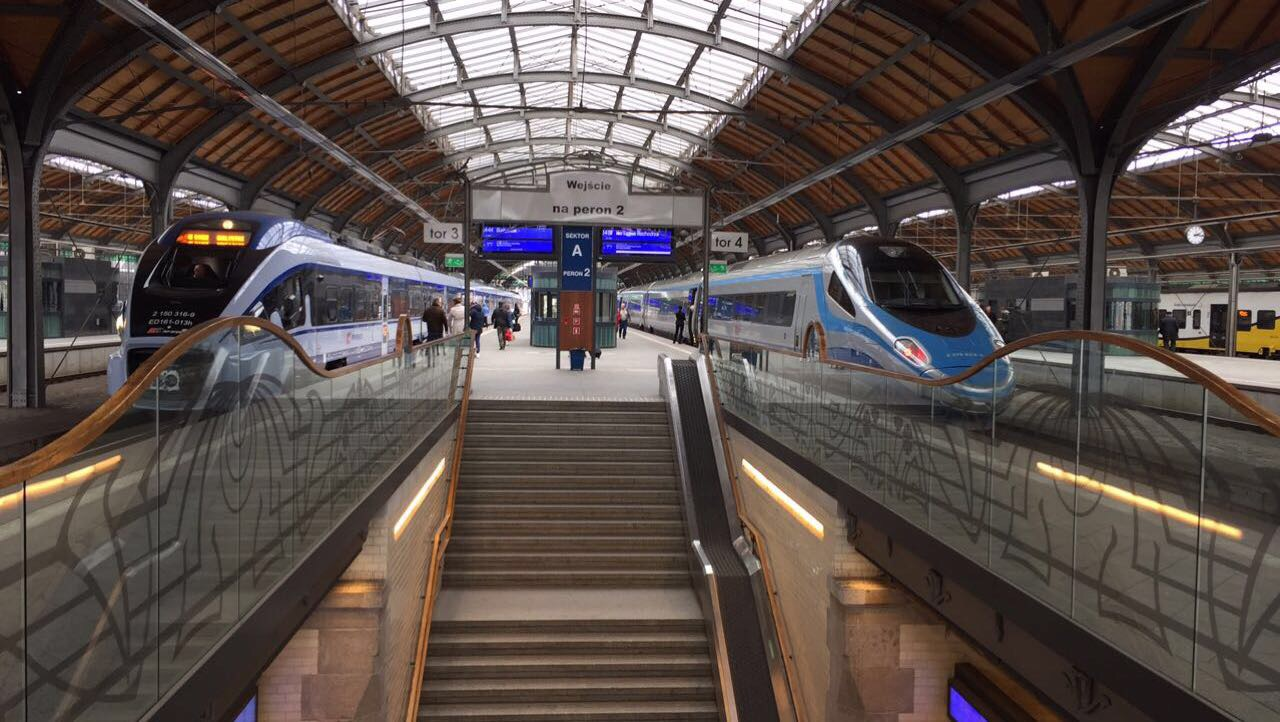
Platform 2

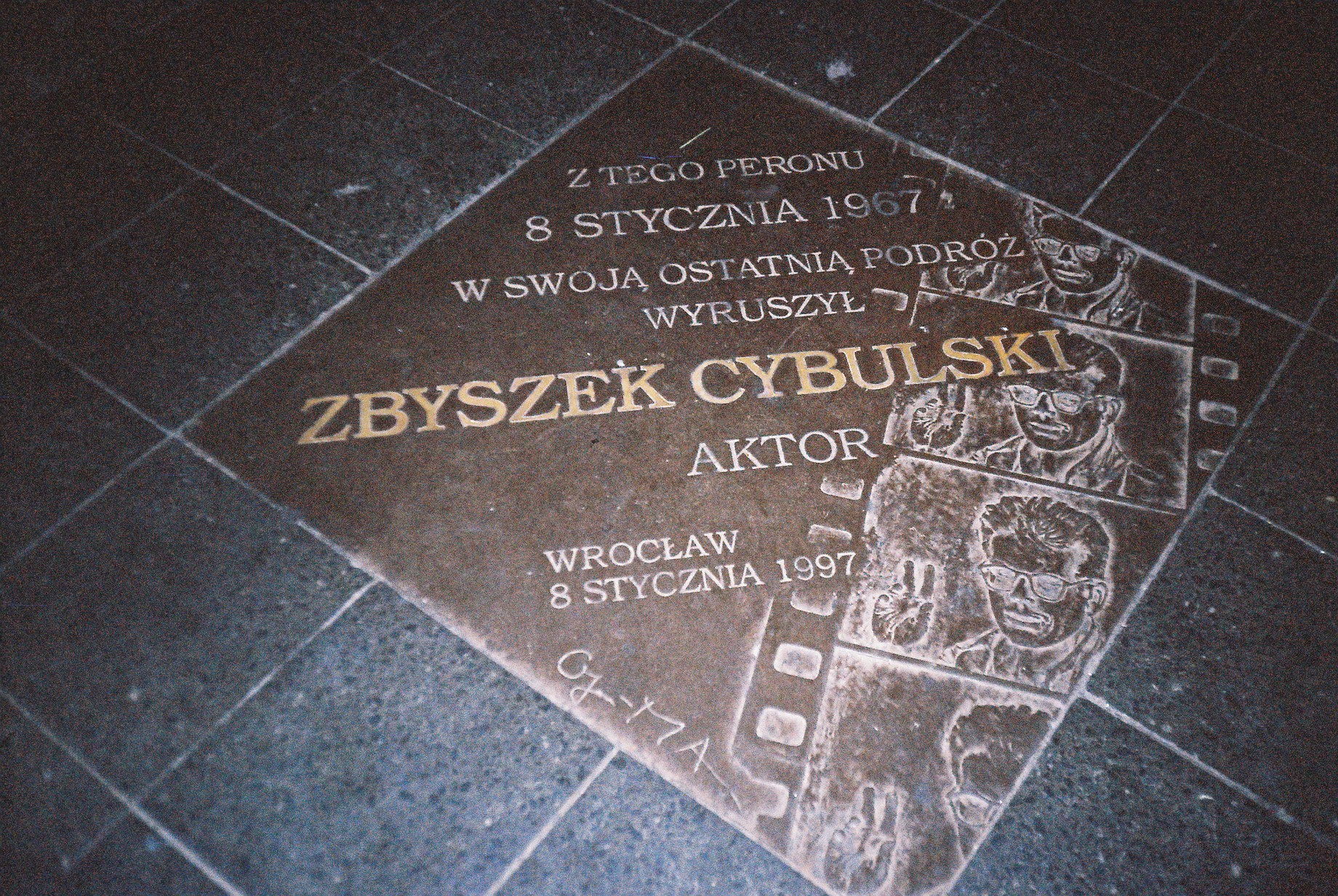
Zbigniew Cybulski commemorative plaque

== See also ==
- Wrocław Górnośląski railway station
- List of busiest railway stations in Poland
- Rail transport in Poland
