= Wilhelm Grapow =

German railway architect

- Born: 1828; Groß Wartenberg, Province of Silesia, Kingdom of Prussia (now Poland)
- Died: 6 May 1902
- Occupation: Architect
- Known for: Wrocław Główny railway station

Wilhelm Grapow (1828 – 6 May 1902) was a German architect active in Wrocław from 1854 to 1870. He is known for designing Wrocław Główny railway station, and being the Royal Architect of the Upper Silesian Railway. Grapow was born in Groß Wartenberg (now Syców) and died in Berlin.

In 2016, a road in Jagodno was named after Grapow.

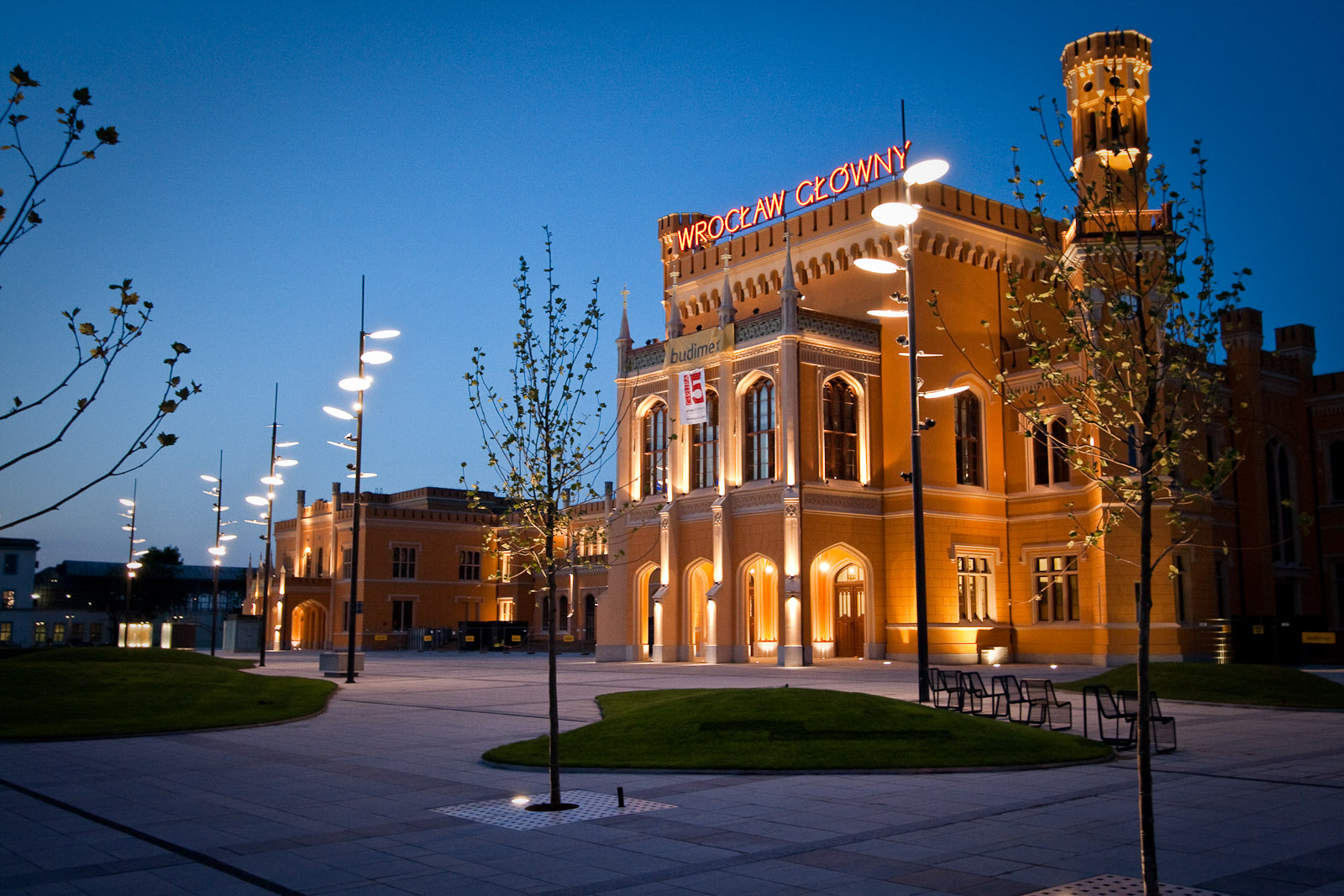
Wrocław Główny railway station was designed by Grapow
