= Wrocław Muchobór railway station =

Railway station in Wrocław, Poland

Wrocław Muchobór
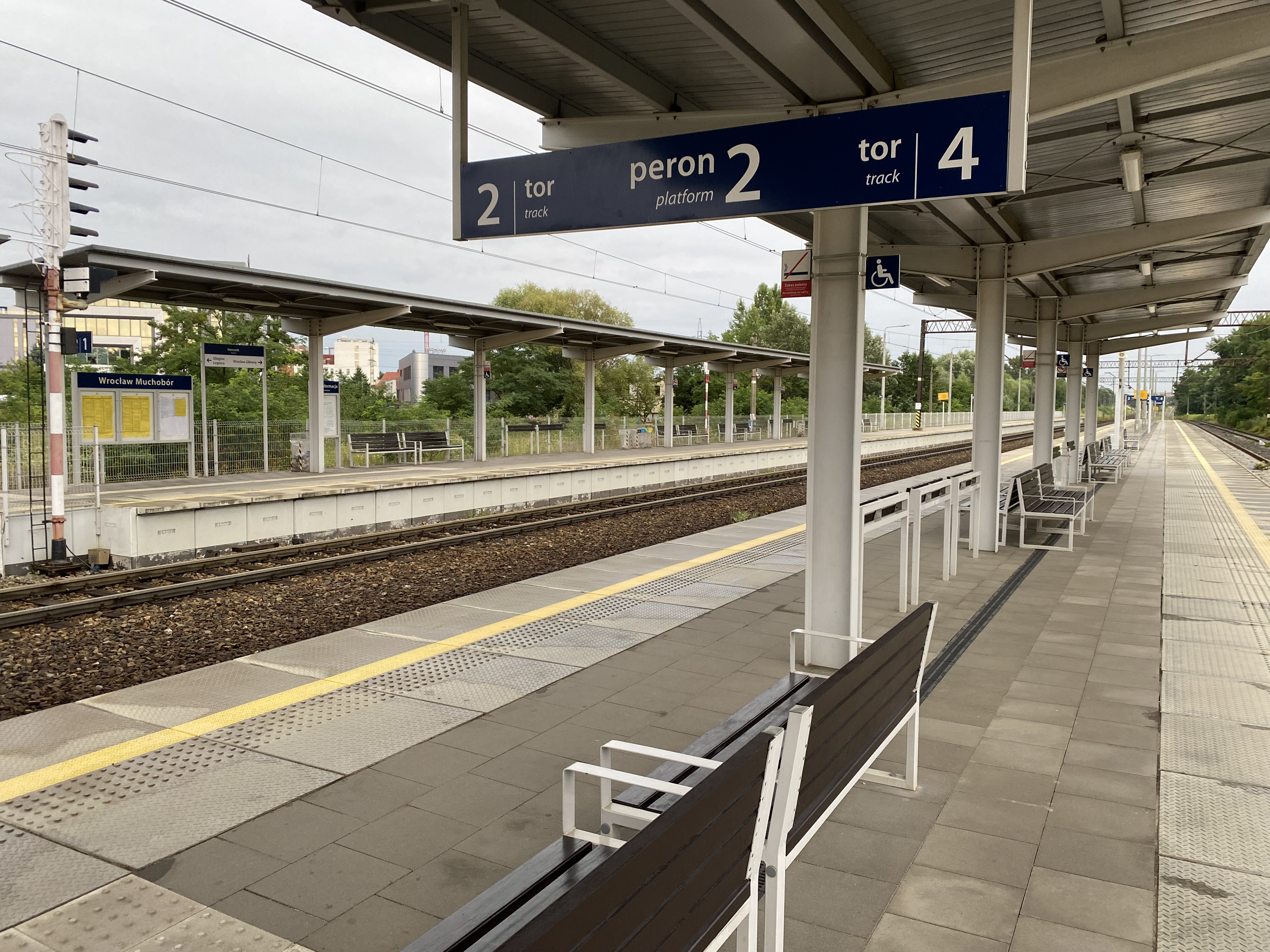
- Platforms

General information
- Other names: Klein Mochbern, Breslau Klein Mochbern, Breslau Mochbern Personenbahnhof, Wrocław Muchobór Osobowy
- Location: Muchobór Mały, Wrocław, Lower Silesian Voivodeship; Poland
- Coordinates: 51°06′38″N 16°58′30″E
- Operator: PKP Polskie Linie Kolejowe
- Train operators: Polregio; Lower Silesian Railways

History
- Opened: 1874; 152 years ago
Services
Preceding station	KD	Following station
Wrocław Główny Terminus	D1	Wrocław Kuźniki towards Lubań Śląski
Wrocław Główny Terminus	D10	Wrocław Kuźniki towards Dresden Hauptbahnhof
Wrocław Główny Terminus	D11	Wrocław Kuźniki towards Głogów
Wrocław Główny Terminus	D25	Wrocław Kuźniki towards Forst (Lausitz)
Location
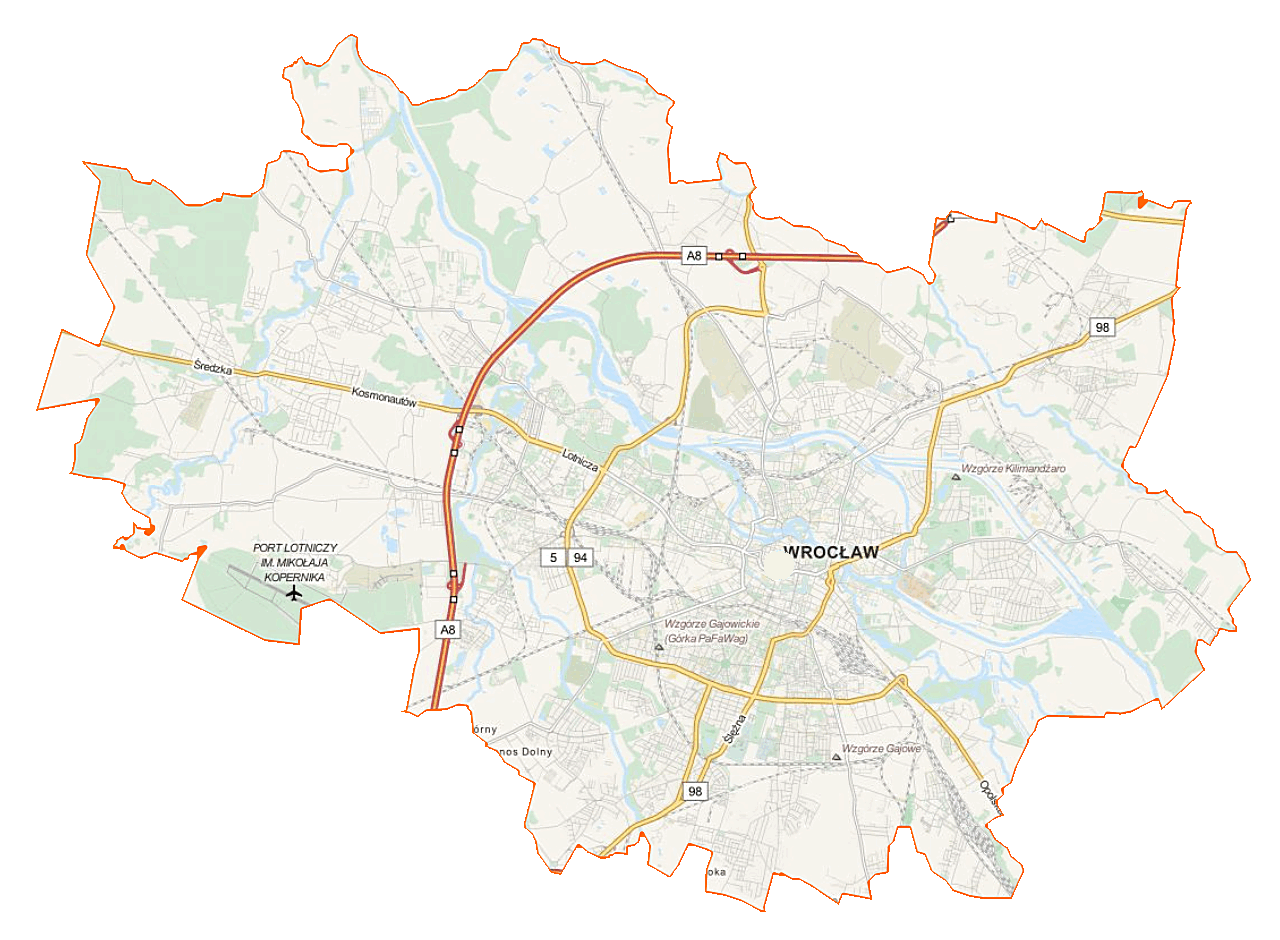
- Location within Wrocław

Wrocław Muchobór is a railway station in the Muchobór Mały district of Wrocław in the Lower Silesian Voivodeship in south-west Poland.

== Railway geography ==
The station lies on Traktowa Street located at the crossroads of the Wrocław–Szczecin and Wrocław–Guben lines. Only passenger trains towards Zielona Góra and Legnica stop at the station. It is an important railway junction where the freight bypass begins (from the north-western side).

== History ==
Over the course of several decades, three stations were named Muchobor or Mochbern, station in Muchobor Wielki is now Wrocław Zachodni, and Gądów is now Wrocław Gądów. Within the station, there is the Local Control Centre launched in 2011. The station is popular due to the fact that it is located in an office district, also called Mordor.

In 2021, Wrocław Muchobór station was renovated with two new elevated platforms, improved underpasses, and four elevators to enhance accessibility. The project included weather-protected benches, bicycle racks, and better drainage to prevent flooding. The upgrade costed 16 million Polish złoty.

In 2022, 700-999 passengers were passing through the station daily.

== Gallery ==
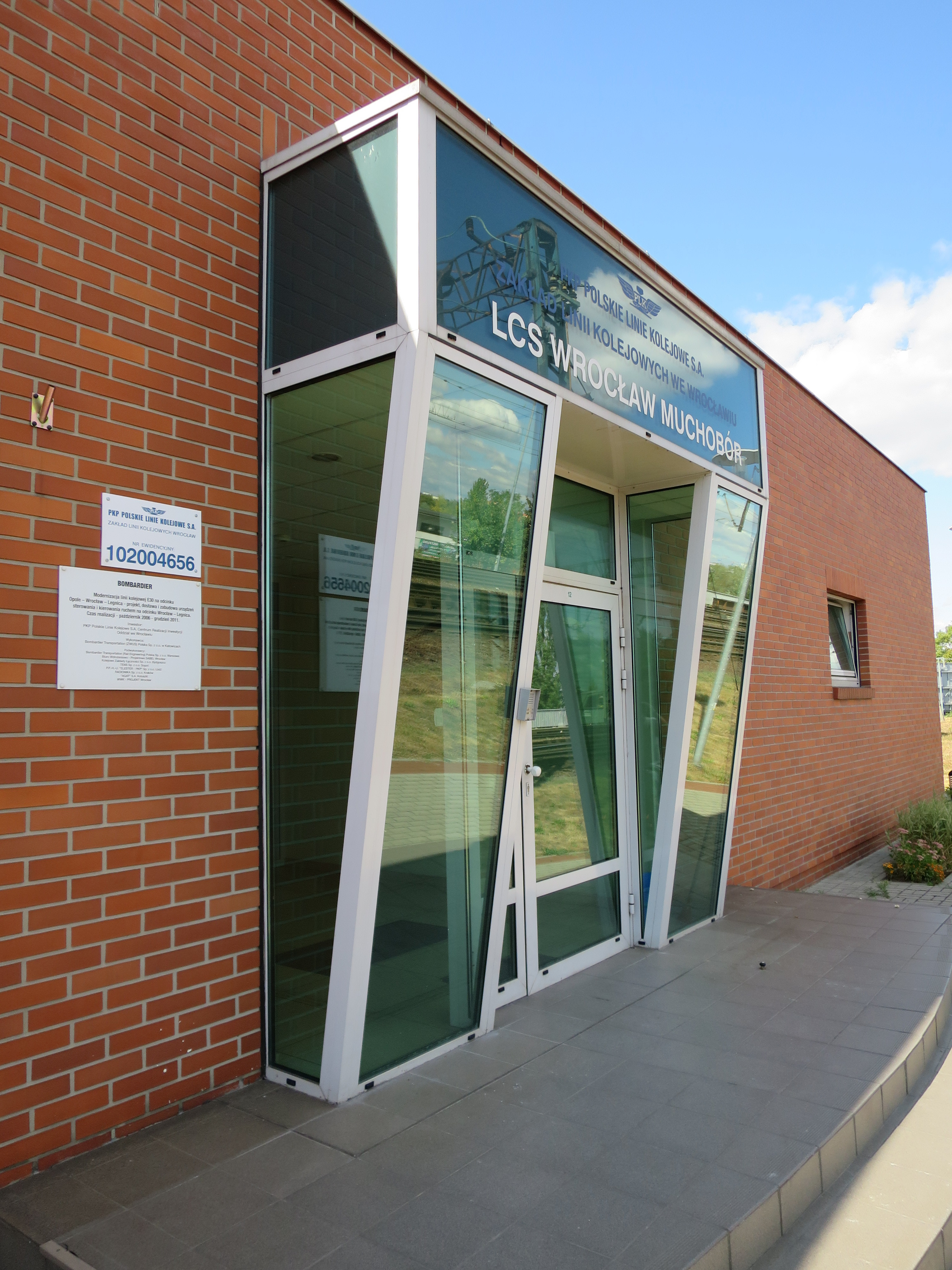
LCS Wrocław Muchobór "WM"

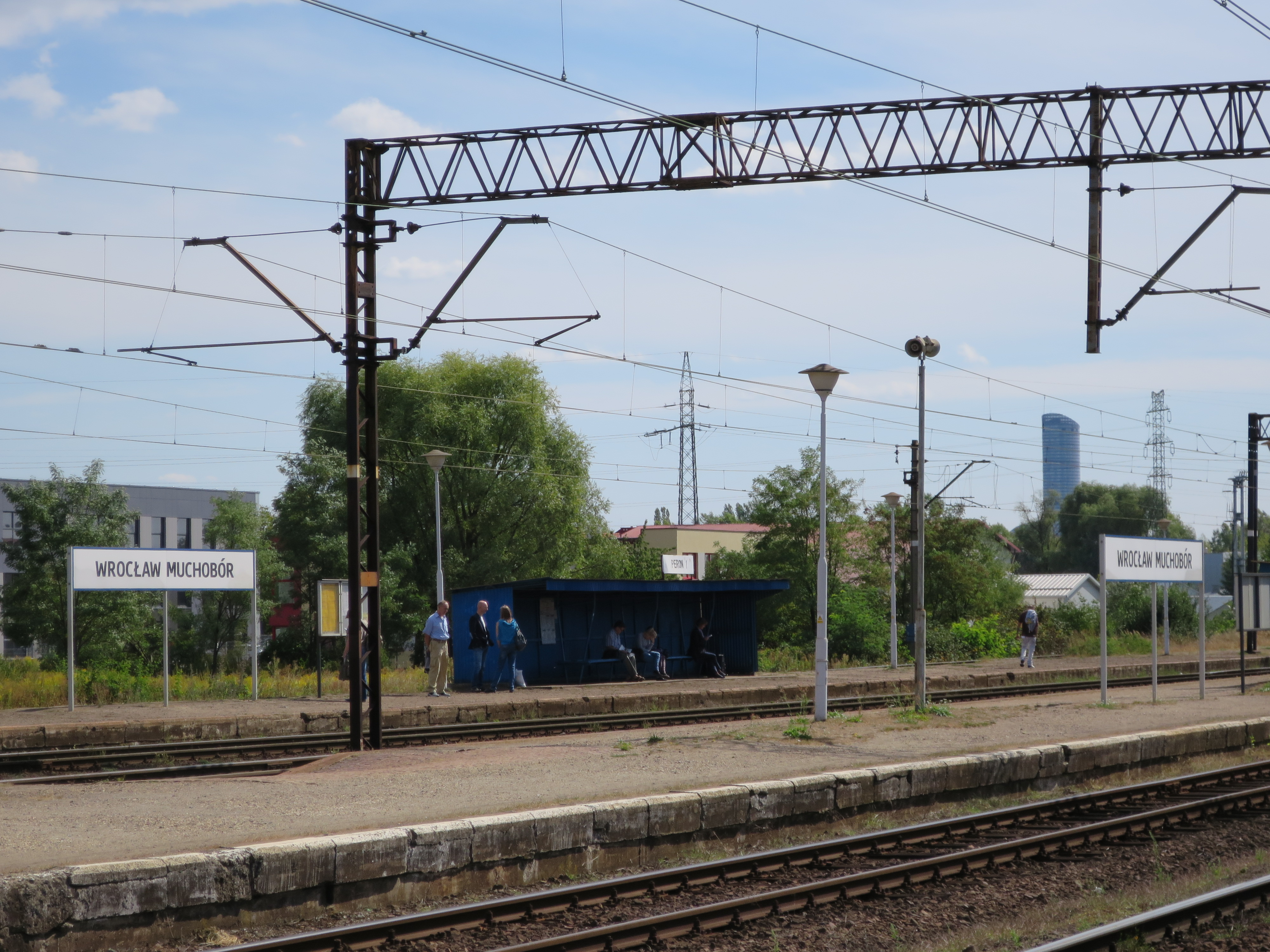
Platforms prior to renovations

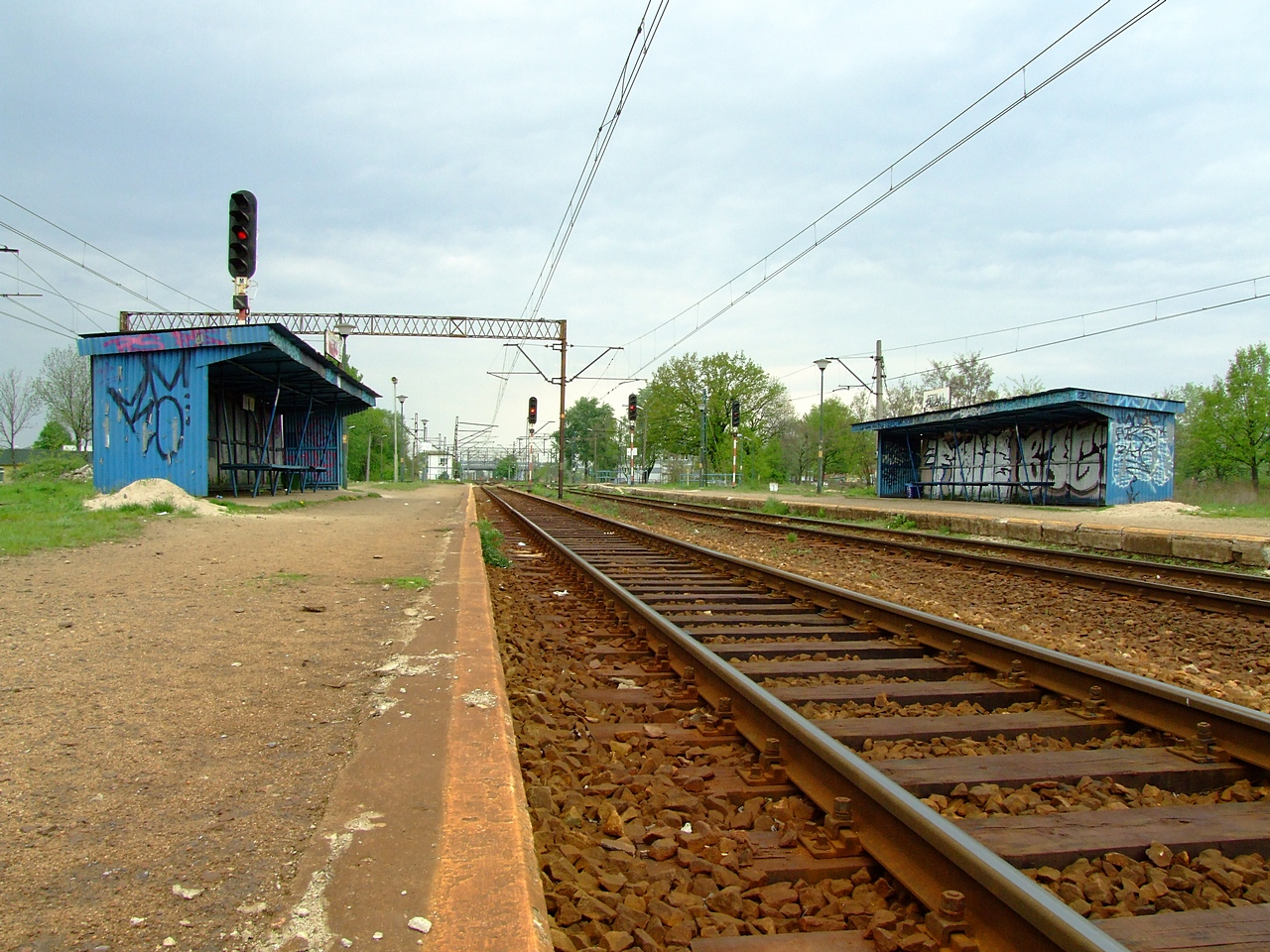

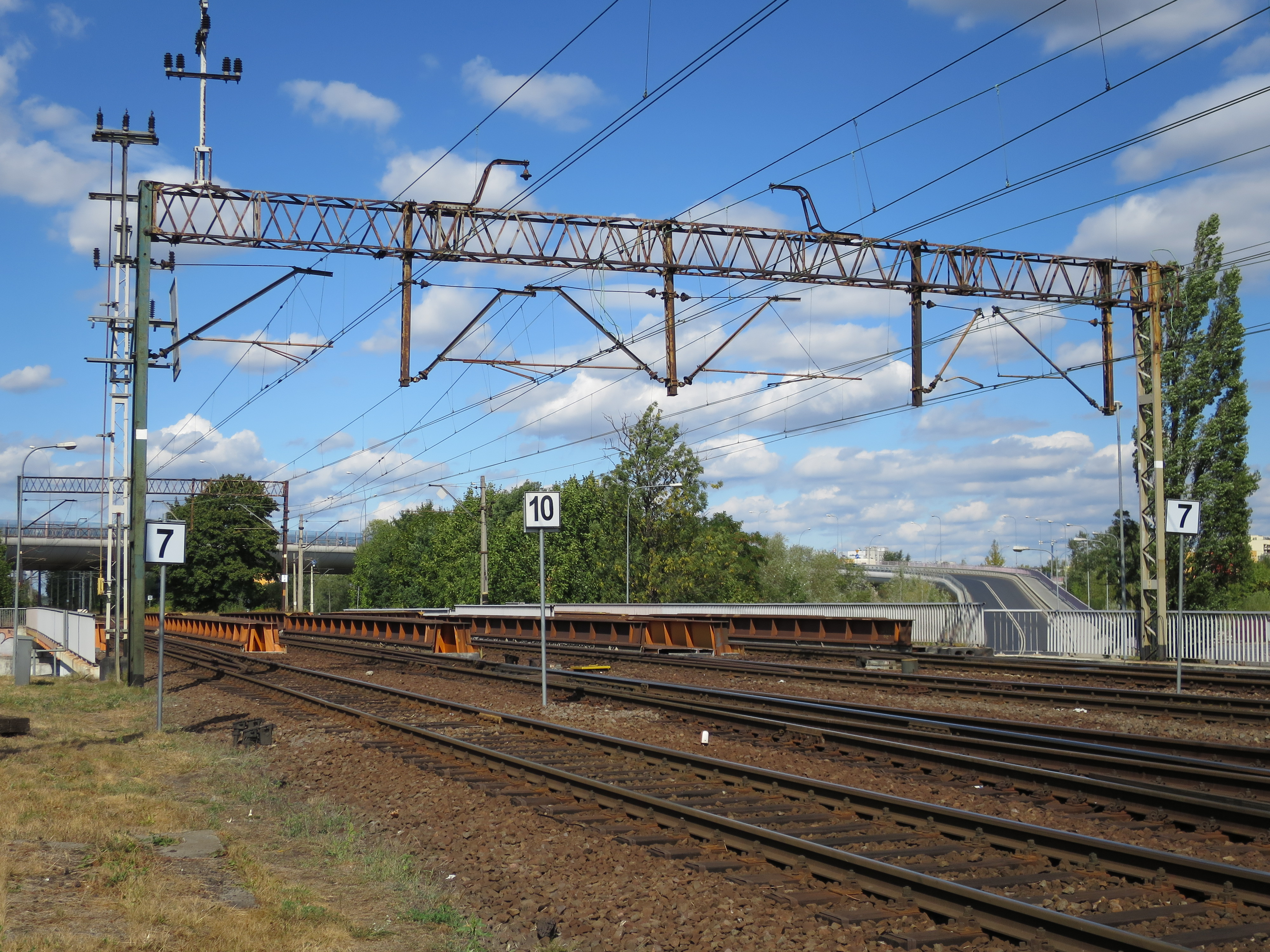
