= Wrocław Mikołajów railway station =

Railway station in Poland

Wrocław Mikołajów
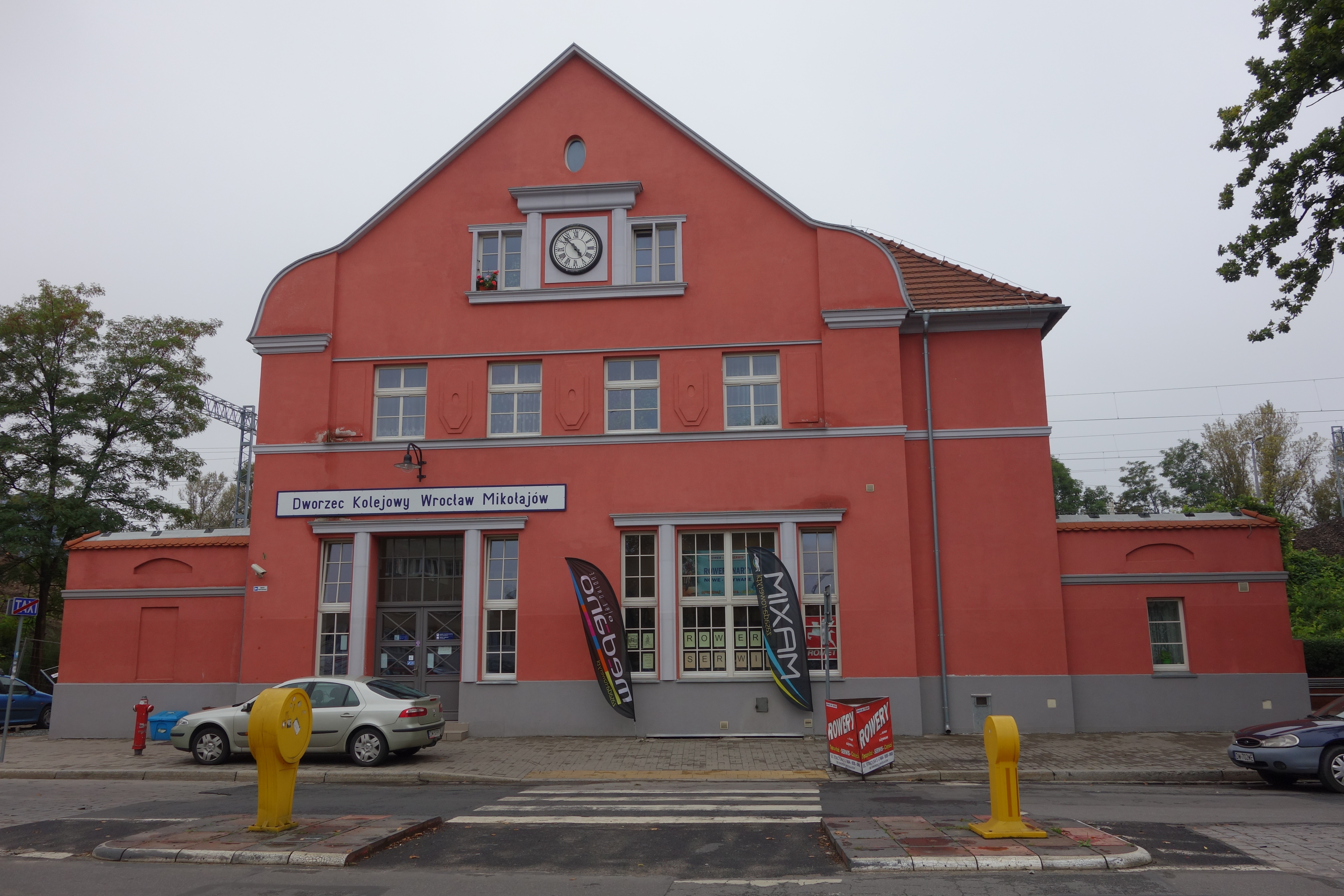
- Station building view from Stacyjna Street

General information
- Location: Stacyjna 5, 53-613 Wrocław; Fabryczna/Szczepin, Wrocław; Poland
- Coordinates: 51°6′55″N 16°59′53″E
- Platforms: 2
- Tracks: 4
- Train operators: PKP Intercity; Polregio; Lower Silesian Railways

History
- Opened: 1906
- Former names: Breslau Nikolaitor (until 1945)
Location
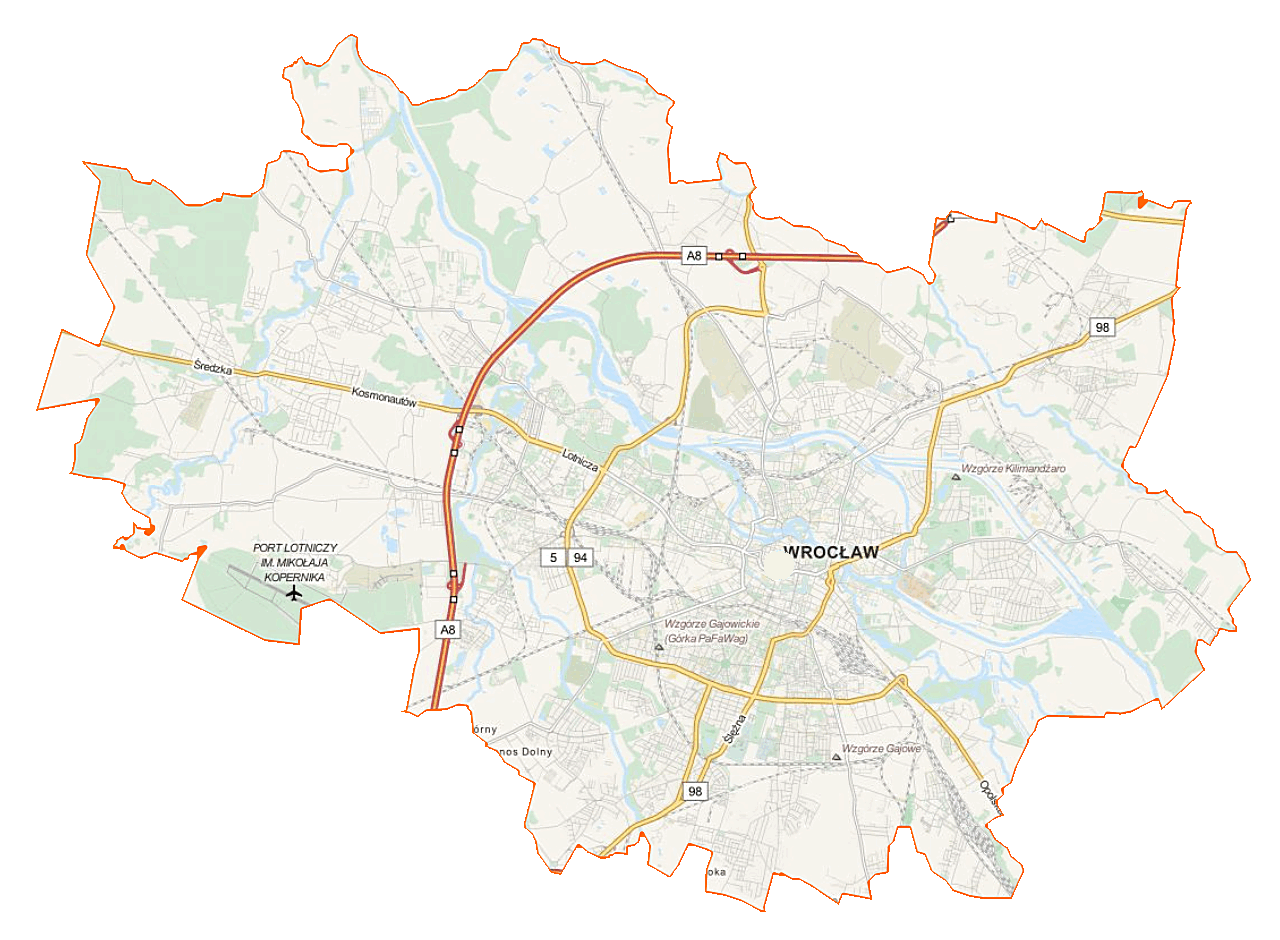
- Location within Wrocław

Wrocław Mikołajów is a railway station located in Wrocław, in the Szczepin neighborhood, at 5 Stacyjna Street. It is situated at the intersection of railway line no. 271 (Wrocław Główny – Poznań Główny) and line no. 143 (Kalety – Wrocław Popowice WP2). The station is located in close proximity to Legnicka Street, a major urban thoroughfare. Wrocław Mikołajów is the second most popular station in Wrocław and plays a significant role in urban and suburban transit as part of the Lower Silesian Agglomeration Railway.

== History ==
The station, was opened in 1906 under the name Breslau Nicolaitor, later changed to Breslau Nikolaitor. After the shift in sovereignty, the station was renamed Wrocław Mikołajów. Between 2010 and 2011, the station underwent renovation, and in 2012, as part of the modernization of the railway line to Poznań, the entire station was rebuilt. Despite these changes, the historic character of the station was preserved, including features like the old clock.

== Connections ==
The station serves trains of most categories operated by all domestic carriers providing passenger services in Lower Silesia, including PKP Intercity, Polregio, and Lower Silesian Railways. Both express and local trains stop at Wrocław Mikołajów. The station offers connections to several agglomeration railway stations, including Wrocław Główny, Bierutów, Jelcz-Laskowice, Kluczbork, Kłodzko Główne, Krotoszyn, Oleśnica, Ostrów Wielkopolski, Rawicz, Trzebnica, and Żmigród.

There are plans to utilize Wrocław Mikołajów as a stop for new urban rapid transit trains operating on Wrocław's southern rail bypass

== Passenger Traffic ==
Year	Annual Passenger Exchange	Daily Passenger Exchange	Rank (Poland)
2017	986 000	2 700	91
2018	1 100 000	3 000	
2019	1 460 000	4 000	71
2020	915 000	2 500	66
2021	986 000	2 700	74
2022		4 200	70
