= Zagra-Lin =

Polish special operations unit

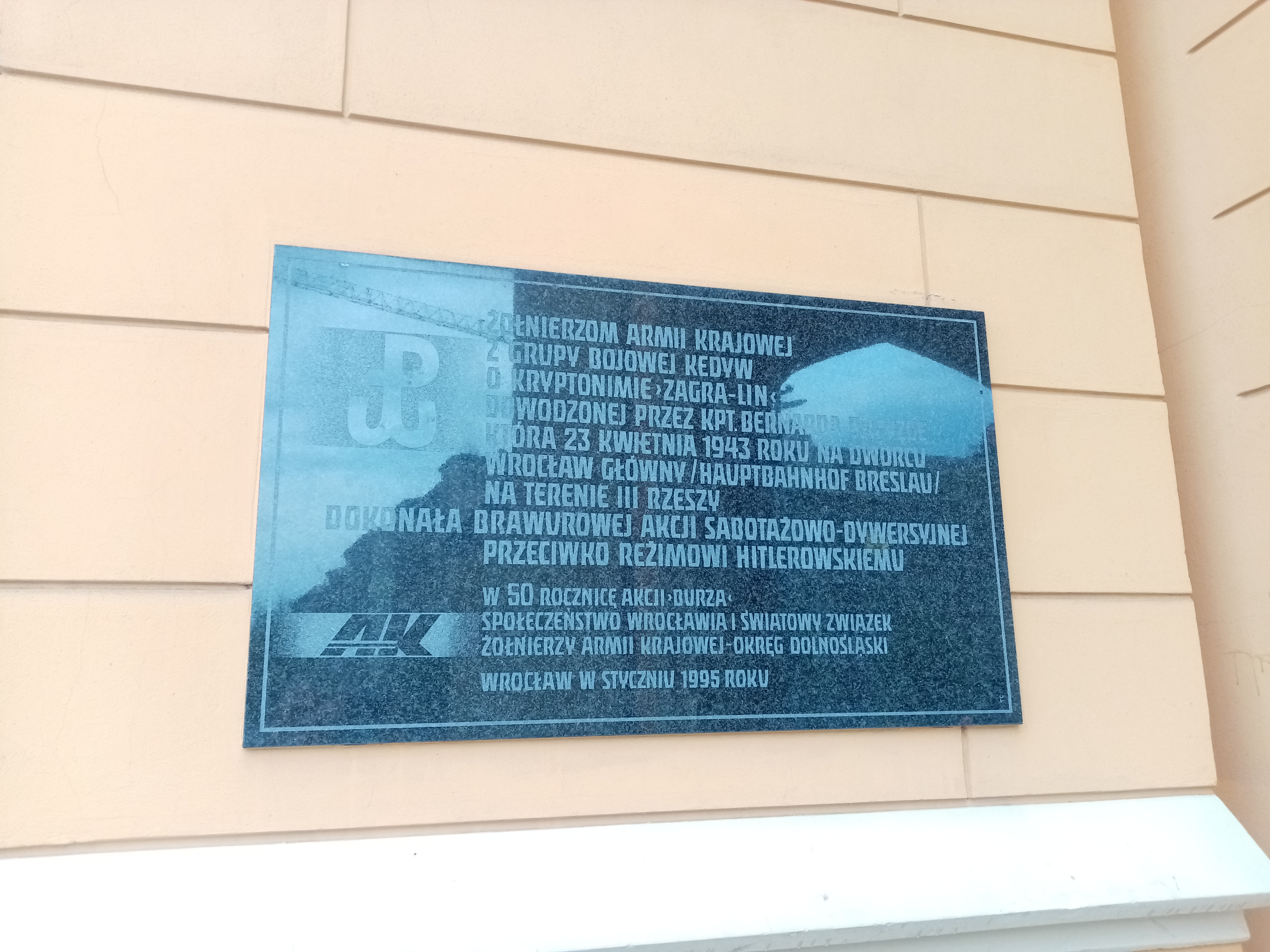
A plaque commemorating a sabotage operation carried out by Zagra-Lin at the main railway station in Wrocław in 1943

Zagra-Lin (full name Kosa Zagra w Linie) was a special operations unit of the Polish Home Army which was active between December 1942 and July 1943. Its main task was to carry out diversion and sabotage actions on the territory of the Third Reich itself (as opposed to occupied Poland), including the parts of pre-war Poland that had been annexed into Nazi Germany.

Zagra-Lin was a separate independent unit which was part of the Organization of Special Combat Actions "Osa-Kosa 30". Its commander was Bernard Drzyzga (nom de guerre "Bogusław").

During its eight-month long existence it carried out numerous successful combat operations, including attacks in Berlin and Breslau (now Wrocław). None of the members of the group who carried out the attacks were ever caught.

It was disbanded in July 1943 after the larger Osa-Kosa 30 organization itself fell to massive arrests by the Gestapo.
