= Smolec railway station =

Railway station in Smolec, Poland

Smolec
- Station building in September 2026

General information
- Location: Smolec, Lower Silesian Voivodeship; Poland
- Coordinates: 51°04′17.3″N 16°52′54.1″E
- Owner: Polish State Railways
- Line: Wrocław Świebodzki–Zgorzelec
- Platforms: 2

History
- Opened: 29 October 1843
- Former names: Schmolz (1843–1945); Smolice Śląskie (1945–1947)
Location
- Location within Poland Location within Lower Silesian Voivodeship

Smolec is a railway station on the Wrocław Świebodzki–Zgorzelec railway in the village of Smolec, Wrocław County, within the Lower Silesian Voivodeship in south-western Poland.

== History ==
Station building c. 1920–1930

The station was opened by the Wrocław-Świdnica-Świebodzice Railway Company as Schmolz on 29 October 1843. After World War II, the area came under Polish administration. As a result, the station was taken over by Polish State Railways (PKP) and was renamed to Smolice Śląskie, and later to its modern name, Smolec in 1947.

On 23 August 1974, as train no. 68884 passed through the station, two railway workers noticed a broken axle in one of the carriages. Following an emergency call made by them, the train stopped just before Wrocław Zachodni, preventing the possible derailment of the train. The two workers were awarded 500 PLN each for their actions. Following the near-derailment, an investigation took place of all the railway workers at all the preceding stations until Jaworzyna Śląska, as PKP discovered that the axle of the aforementioned carriage must have been heating up since at least Jaworzyna Śląska.

In July 2019, it was announced that the station building would be renovated with visualisations showcased by PKP part of a greater redevelopment in the surrounding area. The renovation was completed in January 2021.

== Train services ==
The station is served by the following services:

- Regional services (KD) Wrocław - Wałbrzych - Jelenia Góra
- Regional services (KD) Wrocław - Jaworzyna Śląska - Świdnica - Bielawa Góry Sowie
- Regional services (KD) Wrocław - Wałbrzych - Jelenia Góra - Szklarska Poręba Górna
- Regional services (KD) Wrocław - Jaworzyna Śląska - Świdnica - Głuszyca

Preceding station	KD	Following station
Mokronos Górny towards Wrocław Główny	D6	Sadowice Wrocławskie towards Jelenia Góra
Mokronos Górny towards Wrocław Główny	D40	Sadowice Wrocławskie towards Bielawa Góry Sowie
Mokronos Górny towards Wrocław Główny	D60	Sadowice Wrocławskie towards Szklarska Poręba Górna
Mokronos Górny towards Wrocław Główny	D64	Sadowice Wrocławskie towards Głuszyca
