= Imbramowice =

Imbramowice may refer to the following places in Poland:

- Imbramowice, Lower Silesian Voivodeship (south-west Poland)
  - Imbramowice railway station
- Imbramowice, Lesser Poland Voivodeship (south Poland)
