= Kąty Wrocławskie railway station =

Railway station in Kąty Wrocławskie, Poland

Kąty Wrocławskie
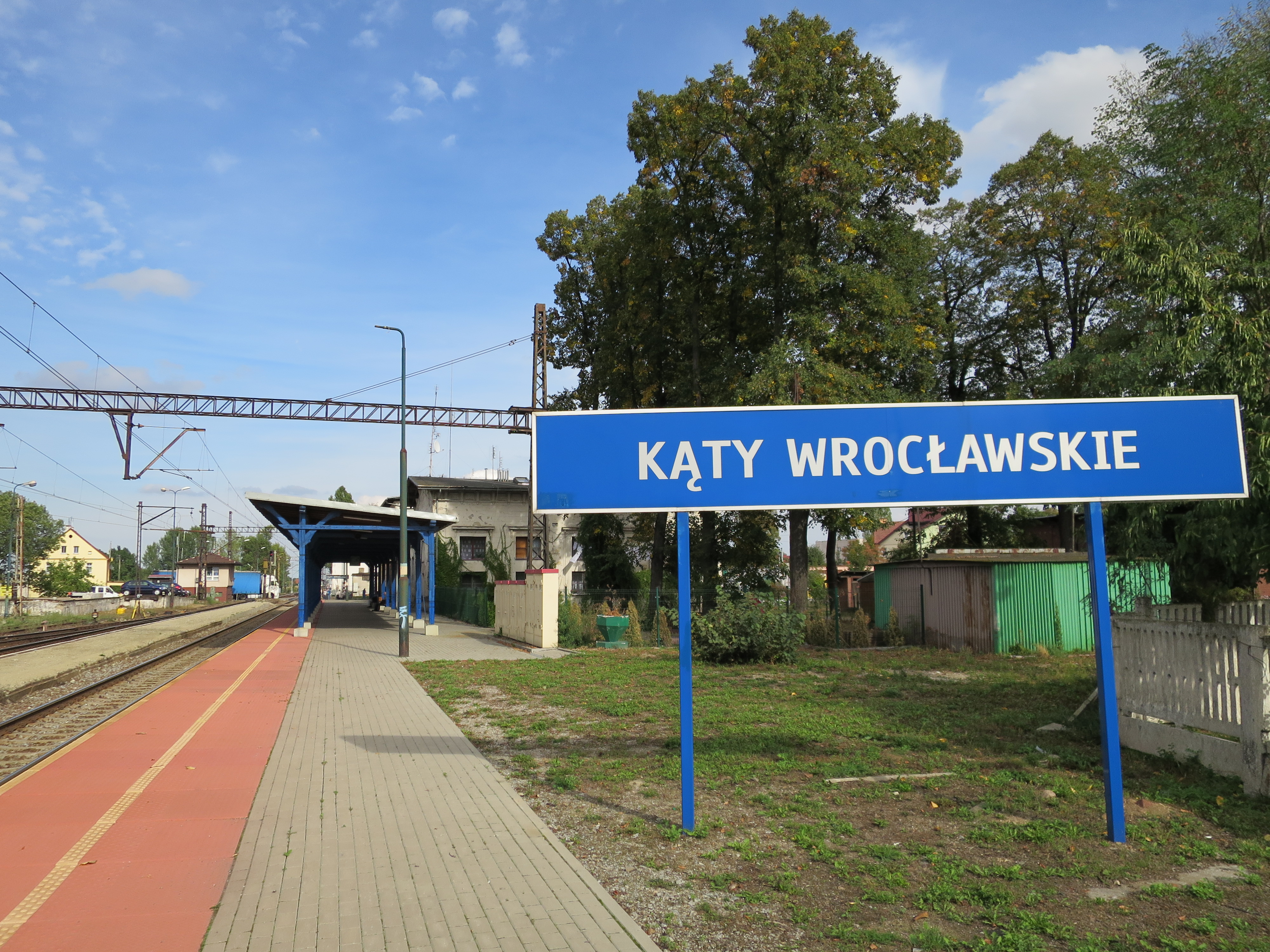
- Station in September 2015

General information
- Location: Kąty Wrocławskie, Lower Silesian Voivodeship; Poland
- Coordinates: 51°02′17.8″N 16°45′05.2″E
- Owner: Polish State Railways
- Line: Wrocław Świebodzki–Zgorzelec
- Platforms: 2

History
- Opened: 29 October 1843
- Former names: Canth (1843–1930); Kanth (1930–1945); Kąty Śląskie (1945–1946); Kąty Wrocławskie (1946–1947)
Location
- Location within Poland Location within Lower Silesian Voivodeship

Kąty Wrocławskie is a railway station on the Wrocław Świebodzki–Zgorzelec railway in the town of Kąty Wrocławskie, Wrocław County, within the Lower Silesian Voivodeship in south-western Poland.

== History ==
The station was opened by the Wrocław-Świdnica-Świebodzice Railway Company as Canth on 29 October 1843. The main building of the station building complex was built in 1920. It was renamed to Kanth in 1930. After World War II, the area came under Polish administration. As a result, the station was taken over by Polish State Railways (PKP) and was renamed to Kąty Śląskie, and later to its modern name, Kąty Wrocławskie in 1947.

In July 2019, it was announced that the station building would be renovated at a cost of approximately 14.5 million złoty, fully financed by PKP's state budget. Work began in October, and was completed in January 2021.

== Train services ==
The station is served by the following services:

- Regional services (KD) Wrocław - Wałbrzych - Jelenia Góra
- Regional services (KD) Wrocław - Jaworzyna Śląska - Świdnica - Bielawa Góry Sowie
- Regional services (KD) Wrocław - Wałbrzych - Jelenia Góra - Szklarska Poręba Górna
- Regional services (KD) Wrocław - Jaworzyna Śląska - Świdnica - Głuszyca

Preceding station	KD	Following station
Sadowice Wrocławskie towards Wrocław Główny	D6	Mietków towards Jelenia Góra
Sadowice Wrocławskie towards Wrocław Główny	D40	Mietków towards Bielawa Góry Sowie
Sadowice Wrocławskie towards Wrocław Główny	D60	Mietków towards Szklarska Poręba Górna
Sadowice Wrocławskie towards Wrocław Główny	D64	Mietków towards Głuszyca
