= Mietków railway station =

Railway station in Mietków, Poland

Mietków
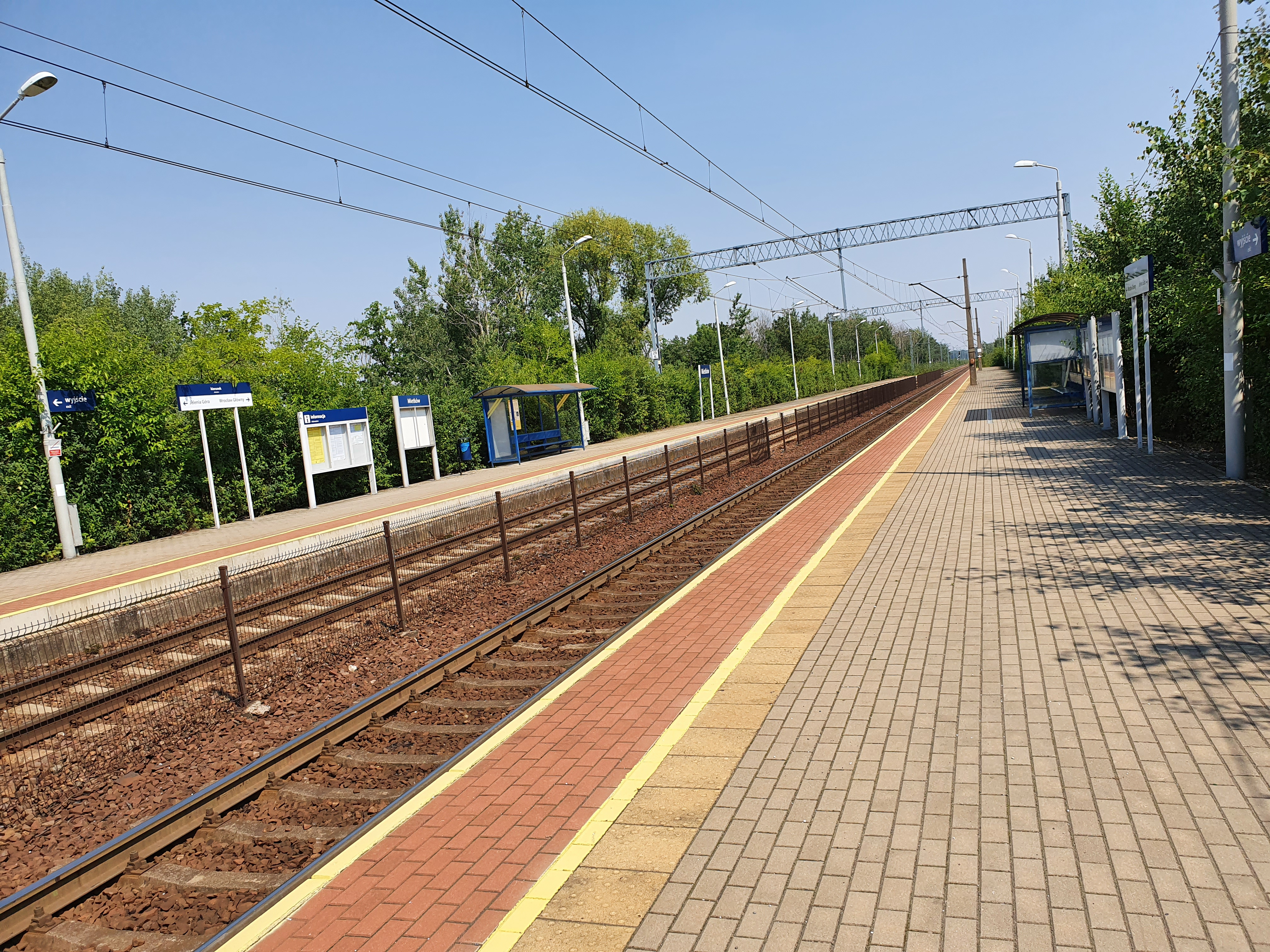
- Platforms

General information
- Location: Mietków, Lower Silesian Voivodeship; Poland
- Coordinates: 50°59′04.4″N 16°39′18.0″E
- Owner: Polish State Railways
- Line: Wrocław Świebodzki–Zgorzelec
- Platforms: 2

History
- Opened: 1983 (current location)
Location
- Location within Poland Location within Lower Silesian Voivodeship

Mietków is a railway station on the Wrocław Świebodzki–Zgorzelec railway in the village of Mietków, Wrocław County, within the Lower Silesian Voivodeship in south-western Poland.

== History ==
The original station was opened by the Wrocław-Świdnica-Świebodzice Railway Company as Mettkau on 29 October 1843. A station building was constructed in 1853. After World War II, the area came under Polish administration. As a result, the station was taken over by Polish State Railways (PKP) and was renamed to Mietków.

In the 1980s, around 7.5 km (4.7 mi) of the Wrocław Świebodzki–Zgorzelec railway was shifted slightly north to make space for the Mietków Lake which was under construction at the time. The original 1843 station closed, and was converted into sidings, and a new station was built as a halt some 350 m (1,150 ft) north of the original location. It opened in 1983.

== Train services ==
The station is served by the following services:

- Regional services (KD) Wrocław - Wałbrzych - Jelenia Góra
- Regional services (KD) Wrocław - Jaworzyna Śląska - Świdnica - Bielawa Góry Sowie
- Regional services (KD) Wrocław - Wałbrzych - Jelenia Góra - Szklarska Poręba Górna
- Regional services (KD) Wrocław - Jaworzyna Śląska - Świdnica - Głuszyca

Preceding station	KD	Following station
Kąty Wrocławskie towards Wrocław Główny	D6	Imbramowice towards Jelenia Góra
Kąty Wrocławskie towards Wrocław Główny	D40	Imbramowice towards Bielawa Góry Sowie
Kąty Wrocławskie towards Wrocław Główny	D60	Imbramowice towards Szklarska Poręba Górna
Kąty Wrocławskie towards Wrocław Główny	D64	Imbramowice towards Głuszyca
