= Sadowice Wrocławskie railway station =

Railway station in Sadowice, Poland

Sadowice Wrocławskie
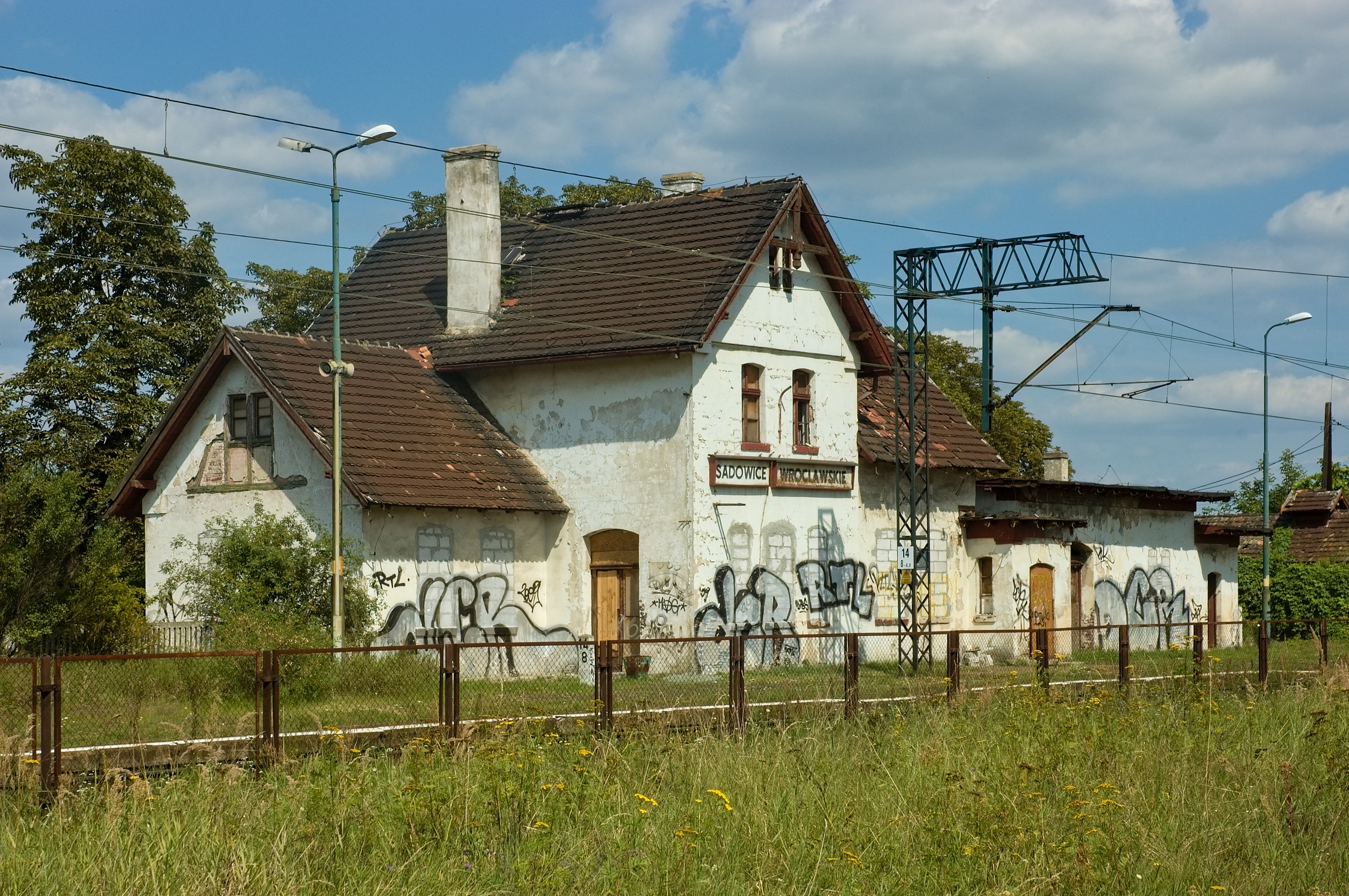
- Station building in August 2009

General information
- Location: Sadowice, Lower Silesian Voivodeship; Poland
- Coordinates: 51°03′22.3″N 16°49′30.5″E
- Owner: Polish State Railways
- Line: Wrocław Świebodzki–Zgorzelec
- Platforms: 2

History
- Opened: 1 December 1898
- Former names: Sadewitz (1898–1937); Schill (1937–1945); Sadowice (1945–1951)
Location
- Location within Poland Location within Lower Silesian Voivodeship

Sadowice Wrocławskie is a railway station on the Wrocław Świebodzki–Zgorzelec railway in the village of Sadowice, Wrocław County, within the Lower Silesian Voivodeship in south-western Poland.

== History ==
The station was opened by Prussian State Railways as Sadewitz on 1 December 1898. It was renamed to Schill in 1937. After World War II, the area came under Polish administration. As a result, the station was taken over by Polish State Railways (PKP) and was renamed to Sadowice, and later to its modern name, Sadowice Wrocławskie in 1951. The goods yard closed in February 1964.

In 2023 it was proposed for the station building to be renovated and repurposed for tourism, as a starting point for the Bystrzyca Valley Landscape Park.

== Train services ==
The station is served by the following services:

- Regional services (KD) Wrocław - Wałbrzych - Jelenia Góra
- Regional services (KD) Wrocław - Jaworzyna Śląska - Świdnica - Bielawa Góry Sowie
- Regional services (KD) Wrocław - Wałbrzych - Jelenia Góra - Szklarska Poręba Górna
- Regional services (KD) Wrocław - Jaworzyna Śląska - Świdnica - Głuszyca

Preceding station	KD	Following station
Smolec towards Wrocław Główny	D6	Kąty Wrocławskie towards Jelenia Góra
Smolec towards Wrocław Główny	D40	Kąty Wrocławskie towards Bielawa Góry Sowie
Smolec towards Wrocław Główny	D60	Kąty Wrocławskie towards Szklarska Poręba Górna
Smolec towards Wrocław Główny	D64	Kąty Wrocławskie towards Głuszyca
