= Wrocław Grabiszyn railway station =

Railway station in Grabiszyn-Grabiszynek, Wrocław, Poland

Wrocław Grabiszyn
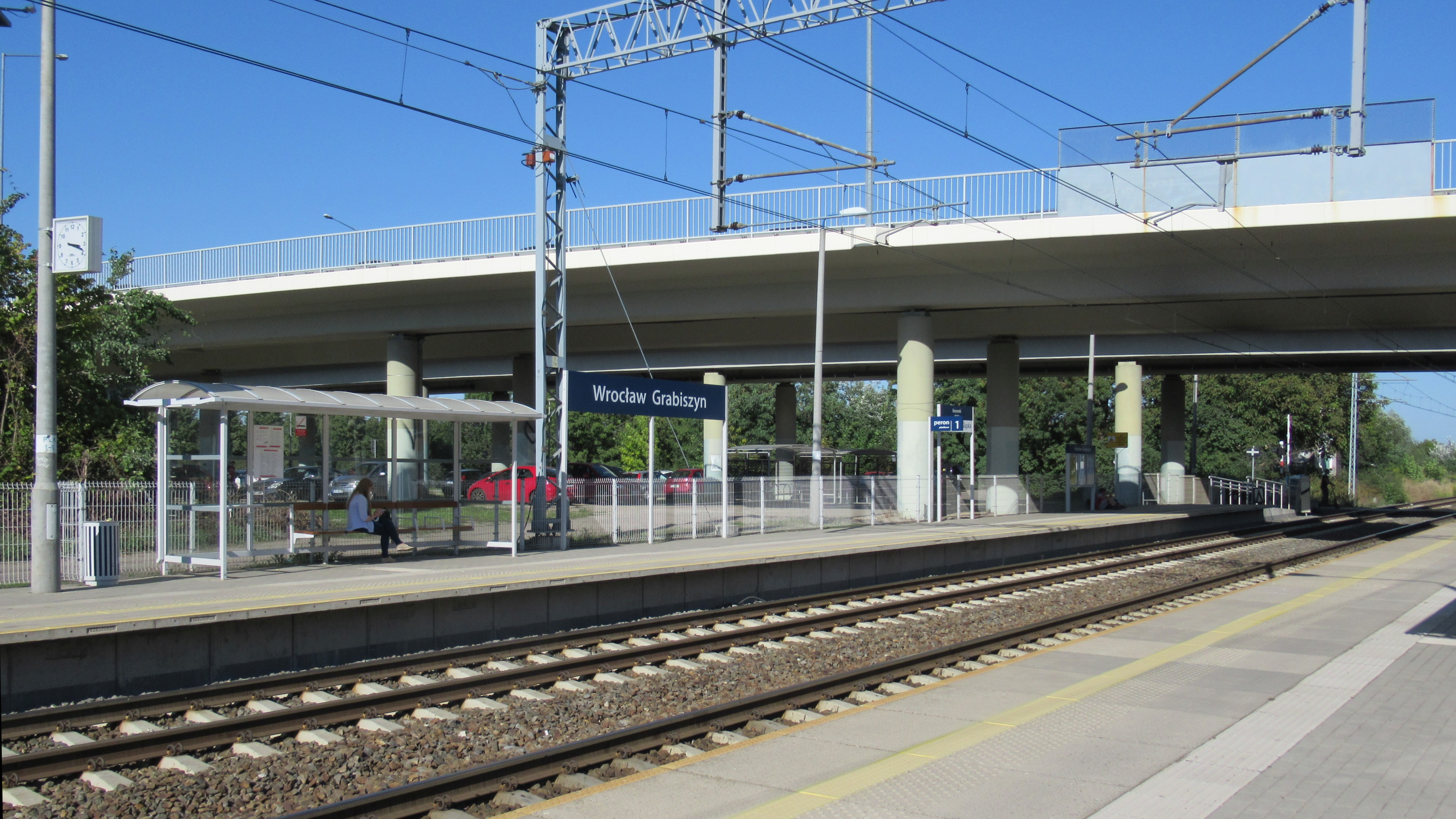
- Platforms in September 2021

General information
- Location: Grabiszyn-Grabiszynek, Wrocław, Lower Silesian Voivodeship; Poland
- Coordinates: 51°05′48.0″N 16°58′30.0″E
- Owner: Polish State Railways
- Line: Wrocław Świebodzki–Zgorzelec
- Platforms: 2

History
- Opened: 14 December 2014
- Former names: Wrocław FAT
Location
- Location within Poland Location within Lower Silesian Voivodeship

Wrocław Grabiszyn is a railway station on the Wrocław Świebodzki–Zgorzelec railway in the Grabiszyn-Grabiszynek district of Wrocław in the Lower Silesian Voivodeship in south-western Poland.

Wrocław Grabiszyn is the final station of the Wrocław Świebodzki–Zgorzelec railway before it proceeds to Wrocław Świebodzki, which has been closed since the 1990s.

== History ==
The construction of a railway halt near Klecińska Street (Wrocław's city centre flyover), the location of Wrocław Grabiszyn, was first planned as part of the Wrocław Metropolitan Railway project.

Under the same previous plans as part of the Wrocław Metropolitan Railway project, the construction of Wrocław Grabiszyn began in November 2014. Until its opening, the station was called Wrocław FAT, which was named after nearby factories; Fabryki Automatów Tokarskich. The station was built in under one month as it was intended to serve as a temporary terminus for trains arriving from Jelenia Góra, Wałbrzych Główny, and Jaworzyna Śląska. This was scheduled for the construction works of a flyover above Grabiszyńska Street, which required the tracks to be temporarily dismantled east of the station.

The station opened on 14 December 2014, in conjunction with the implementation of the 2014/2015 annual train timetable. Polregio and Lower Silesian Railways services began serving the station, heading towards Dzierżoniów Śląski, Jelenia Góra, Szklarska Poręba Górna, Wrocław Główny, and Poznań Główny. The total construction cost came to 3.23 million PLN; it was also decided at the same time that Wrocław Grabiszyn would remain a permanent station of the network, and would therefore not be demolished after the construction works.

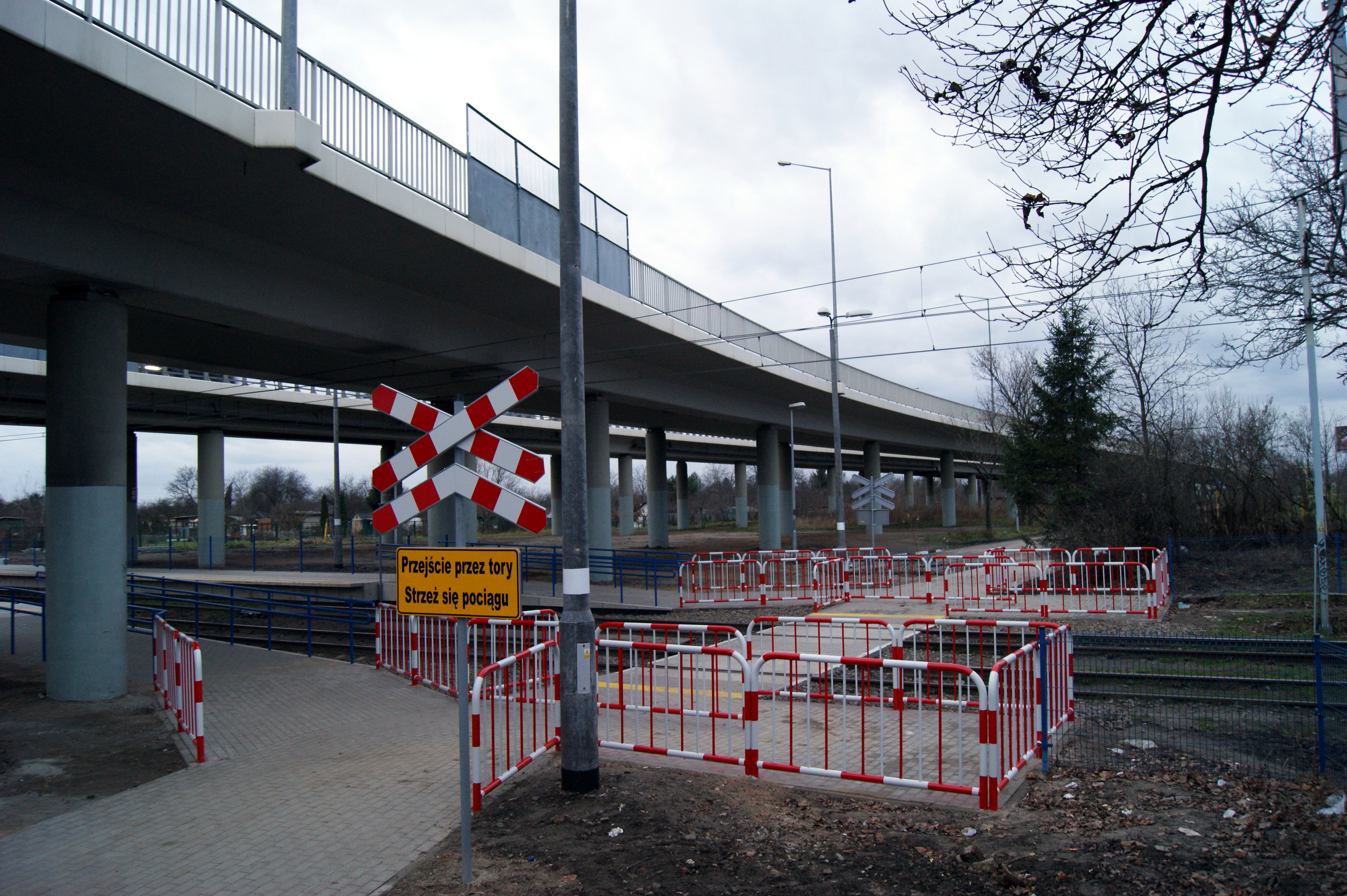
Pedestrian crossing built with the construction of the station

From 26 April 2015, only Lower Silesian Railways services on the Dzierżoniów–Wrocław route, connected at the station with rail replacement buses, were able to reach the station, whilst construction works were ongoing of the flyover over Grabiszyńska Street. All other trains normally calling or non-stopping at the station had to be diverted after Wrocław Zachodni via the Wrocław Gądów–Wrocław Zachodni railway.

Prior to the construction of the flyover, Klecińska Street ran over the railway with a level crossing, in which the road was demolished for the construction of the flyover. After which, a desire path was created by locals over the railway which was often used to illegally cross it. The path became notorious for causing accidents, after people were struck by passing trains, which often resulted in fatalities. With the construction of the station, safe pedestrian crossing was constructed over the railway.

== Station ==
Wrocław Grabiszyn is a railway halt on the Wrocław Świebodzki–Zgorzelec railway consisting of two high-level side platforms, each 150 metres (490 ft) long and 4 m (13 ft) wide. Thanks to the platform's high-level, the station is accessible. Grabiszyn-Grabiszynek is connected via two entrances at the station to Petuniowa Street.

== Train services ==
The station is served by the following services:

- Regional services (KD) Wrocław - Wałbrzych - Jelenia Góra
- Regional services (KD) Wrocław - Jaworzyna Śląska - Świdnica - Bielawa Góry Sowie
- Regional services (KD) Wrocław - Wałbrzych - Jelenia Góra - Szklarska Poręba Górna
- Regional services (KD) Wrocław - Jaworzyna Śląska - Świdnica - Głuszyca

Preceding station	KD	Following station
Wrocław Główny Terminus	D6	Wrocław Zachodni towards Jelenia Góra
Wrocław Główny Terminus	D40	Wrocław Zachodni towards Bielawa Góry Sowie
Wrocław Główny Terminus	D60	Wrocław Zachodni towards Szklarska Poręba Górna
Wrocław Główny Terminus	D64	Wrocław Zachodni towards Głuszyca
