= Żarów railway station =

Railway station in Żarów, Poland

Żarów
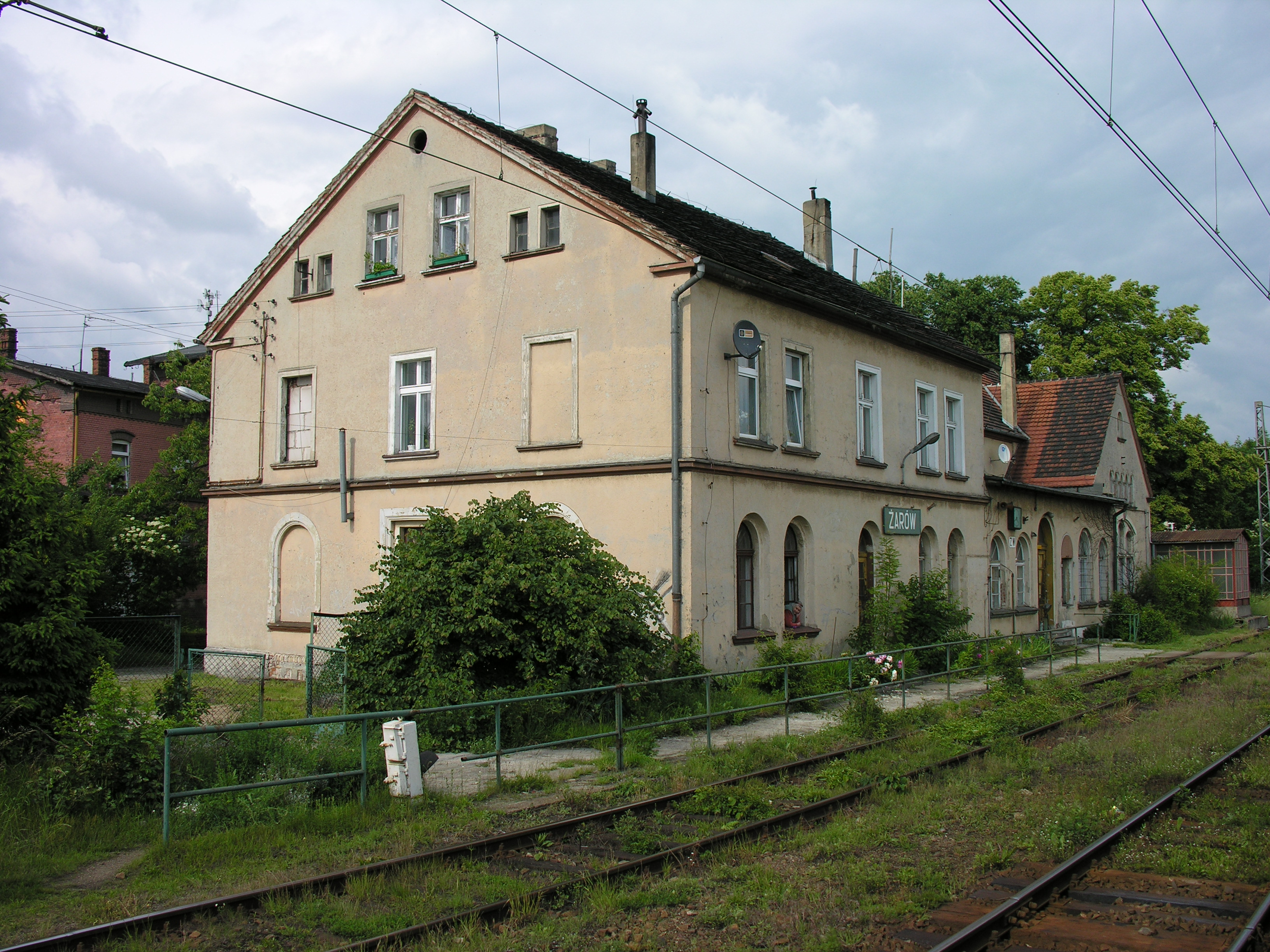
- Station building in 2009, prior to modernisations

General information
- Location: Żarów, Lower Silesian Voivodeship; Poland
- Coordinates: 50°56′23.4″N 16°29′36.4″E
- Owner: Polish State Railways
- Line: Wrocław Świebodzki–Zgorzelec
- Platforms: 2

History
- Opened: 29 October 1843
- Former names: Saarau (1843–1945); Żary (1945–1946); Żary koło Jaworzyny Śląskiej (1946–1947)
Location
- Location within Poland Location within Lower Silesian Voivodeship

Żarów is a railway station on the Wrocław Świebodzki–Zgorzelec railway in the town of Żarów, Świdnica County, within the Lower Silesian Voivodeship in south-western Poland.

== History ==
The station was opened by the Wrocław-Świdnica-Świebodzice Railway Company as Saarau on 29 October 1843. After World War II, the area came under Polish administration. As a result, the station was taken over by Polish State Railways (PKP) and was renamed to Żary, later in 1946 to Żary koło Jaworzyny Śląskiej (to distinguish it from Żary), and eventually to its modern name, Żarów, in 1947.

In 2017–2018, the station building was renovated part of the Railway Station Investment Program, at a cost of approximately 5 million PLN, which was fully funded by PKP themselves. The newly renovated building opened on 24 May 2018.

== Train services ==
The station is served by the following services:

- Regional services (KD) Wrocław - Wałbrzych - Jelenia Góra
- Regional services (KD) Wrocław - Jaworzyna Śląska - Świdnica - Bielawa Góry Sowie
- Regional services (KD) Wrocław - Wałbrzych - Jelenia Góra - Szklarska Poręba Górna
- Regional services (KD) Wrocław - Jaworzyna Śląska - Świdnica - Głuszyca

Preceding station	KD	Following station
Imbramowice towards Wrocław Główny	D6	Jaworzyna Śląska towards Jelenia Góra
Imbramowice towards Wrocław Główny	D40	Jaworzyna Śląska towards Bielawa Góry Sowie
Imbramowice towards Wrocław Główny	D60	Jaworzyna Śląska towards Szklarska Poręba Górna
Imbramowice towards Wrocław Główny	D64	Jaworzyna Śląska towards Głuszyca
