= Świebodzice railway station =

Railway station in Wałbrzych, Poland

Świebodzice
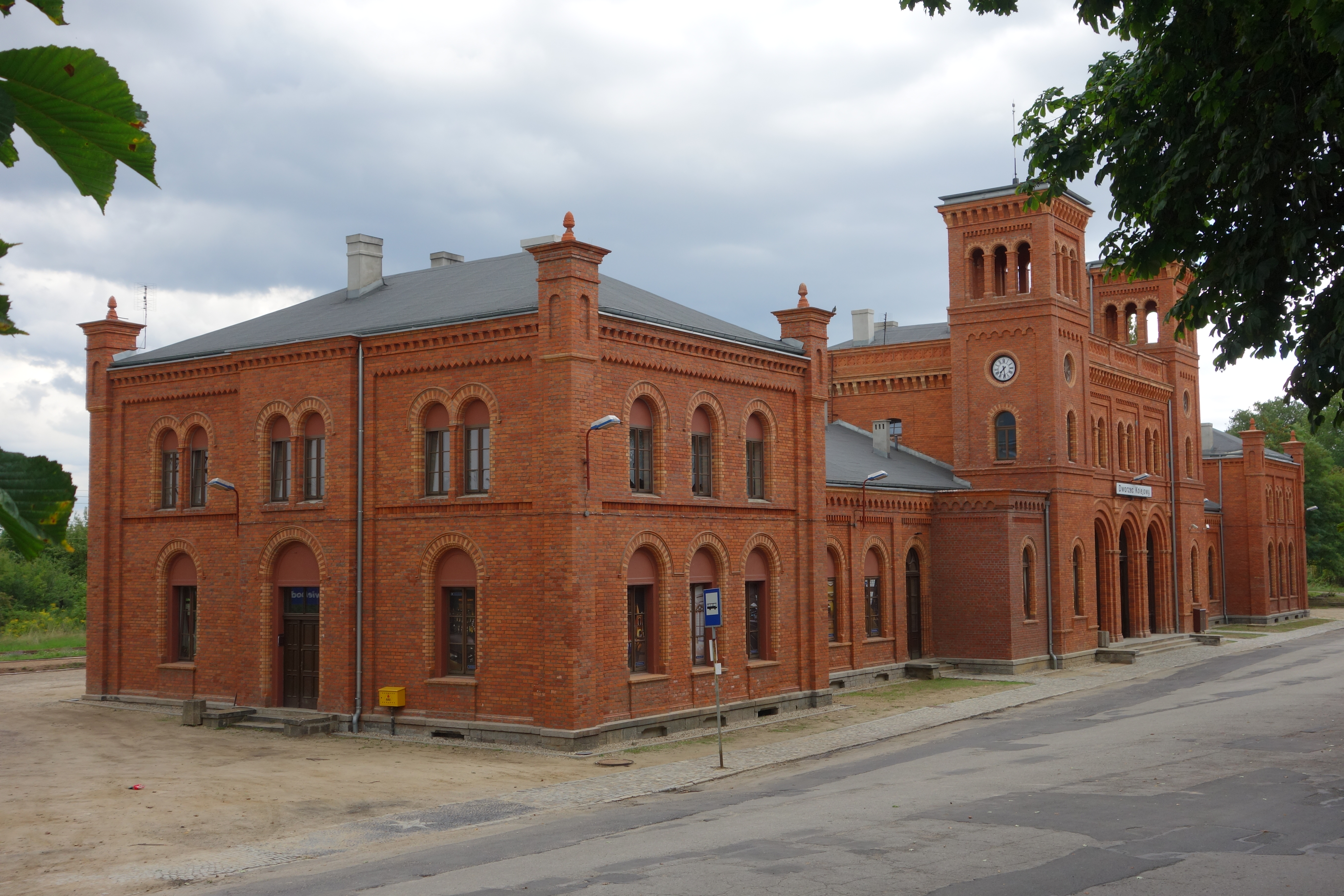
- Station building in August 2014

General information
- Location: Świebodzice, Lower Silesian Voivodeship; Poland
- Coordinates: 50°51′35.9″N 16°19′57.9″E
- Owner: Polish State Railways
- Line: Wrocław Świebodzki–Zgorzelec
- Platforms: 2

History
- Opened: 1869 (current site)
- Former names: Freiburg (1966–1901); Freiburg (Schlesien) (1901–1945)

Services
Preceding station	KD	Following station
Jaworzyna Śląska towards Wrocław Główny	D6	Wałbrzych Szczawienko towards Jelenia Góra
Jaworzyna Śląska towards Wrocław Główny	D60	Wałbrzych Szczawienko towards Szklarska Poręba Górna
Location
- Location within Poland Location within Lower Silesian Voivodeship

Świebodzice is a railway station on the Wrocław Świebodzki–Zgorzelec railway in the town of Świebodzice, Świdnica County, within the Lower Silesian Voivodeship in south-western Poland.

== History ==
The modern station was opened by the Wrocław-Świdnica-Świebodzice Railway Company as Freiburg in 1869. The original station opened in 1843, although at a different location which was replaced by the current one. In 1901, the station was renamed to Freiburg (Schlesien) for designation.

After World War II, the area came under Polish administration. As a result, the station was taken over by Polish State Railways (PKP) and was renamed to Świebodzice. In 2013–2015, the station building was renovated; which was entirely financed by PKP.

On 29 September 2017, PKP Polskie Linie Kolejowe signed a contract for the modernisation of the line and infrastructure at the station. The works were completed in 2020.

== Train services ==
The station is served by the following services:

- Regional services (KD) Wrocław - Wałbrzych - Jelenia Góra
- Regional services (KD) Wrocław - Wałbrzych - Jelenia Góra - Szklarska Poręba Górna
