= Grabiszyn-Grabiszynek =

District in Wrocław, Poland

- District of Wrocław
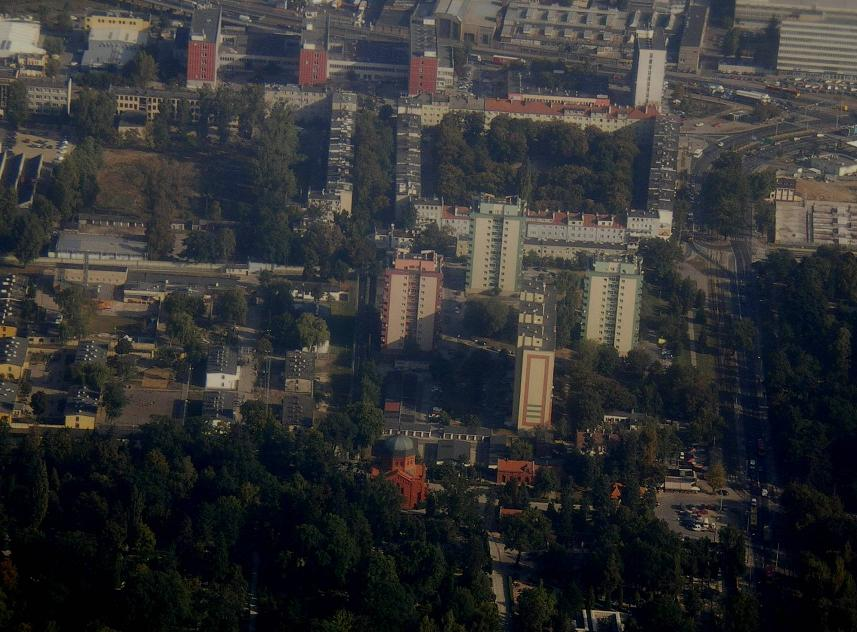

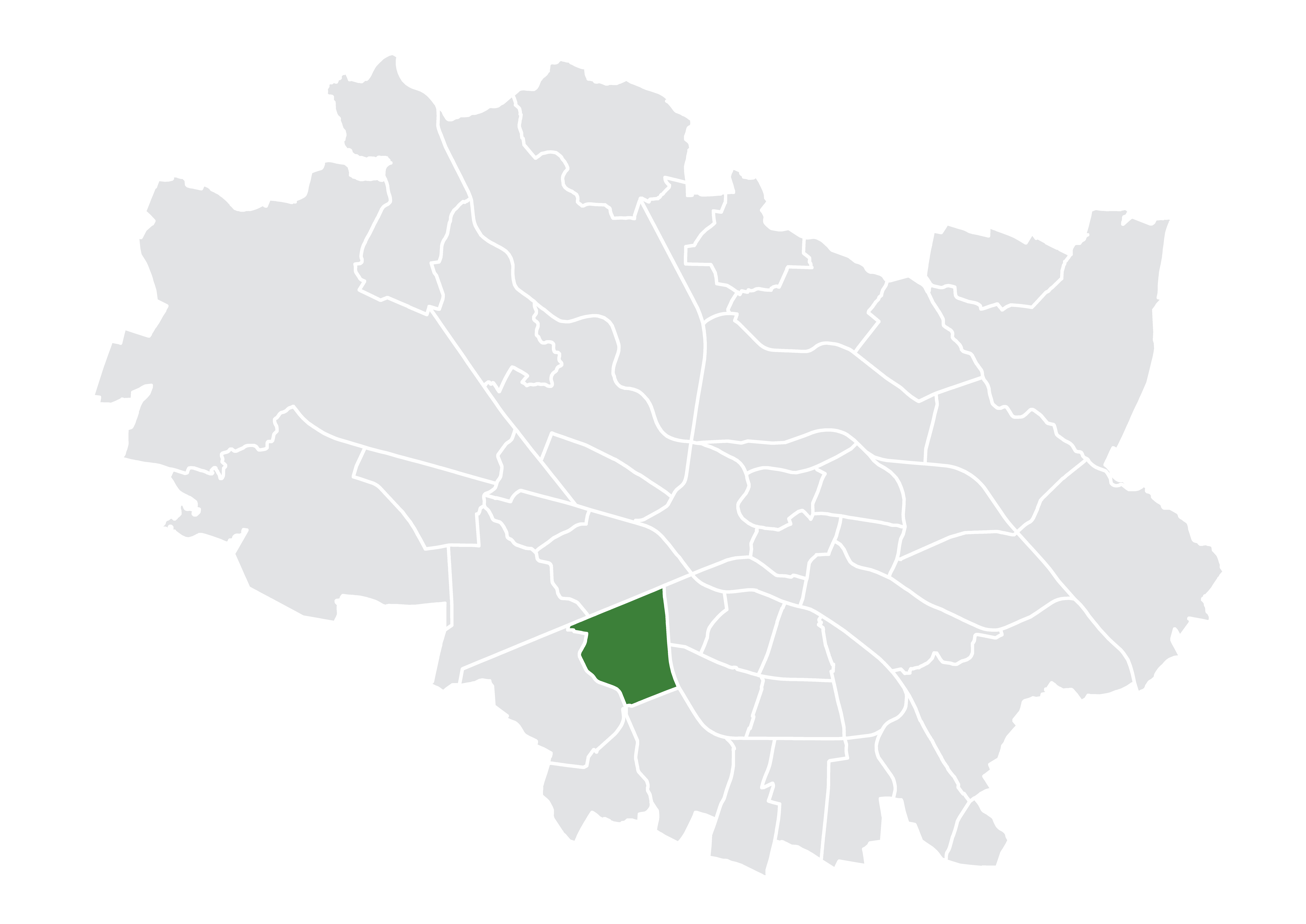
- Location of the district within Wrocław
- Country: Poland
- Voivodeship: Lower Silesian
- County/City: Wrocław
- Established: 1991

Population (2022)
  - Total: 13,170
- Time zone: UTC+1 (CET)
  - Summer (DST): UTC+2 (CEST)
- Area code: +48 71
- Website: Osiedle Grabiszyn-Grabiszynek

Grabiszyn-Grabiszynek (Polish pronunciation: [ɡraˈbiʂɨn ɡrabiˈʂɨnɛk]) is a district in Wrocław located in the south-western part of the city. It was established in the territory of the former Fabryczna district.

In 1991, after reforms in the administrative division of Wrocław, Grabiszyn-Grabiszynek became one of the city's 48 districts as a result of the merger of the settlements of Grabiszyn (German: Gräbschen) and Grabiszynek (German: Leedeborn) which were within the city limits since 1911.

== Location ==
Grabiszyn-Grabiszynek neighbors the neighborhoods (formerly suburban villages) of Borek, Dworek, Gajowice, Oporów, Muchobór Mały, Muchobór Wielki, and Krzyki. Within the district is the Grabiszyn Park.

== Transport ==
Grabiszyn-Grabiszynek is served by Wrocław Grabiszyn railway station.
