= LOT Polish Airlines Flight 149 =

1969 aviation incident in Poland

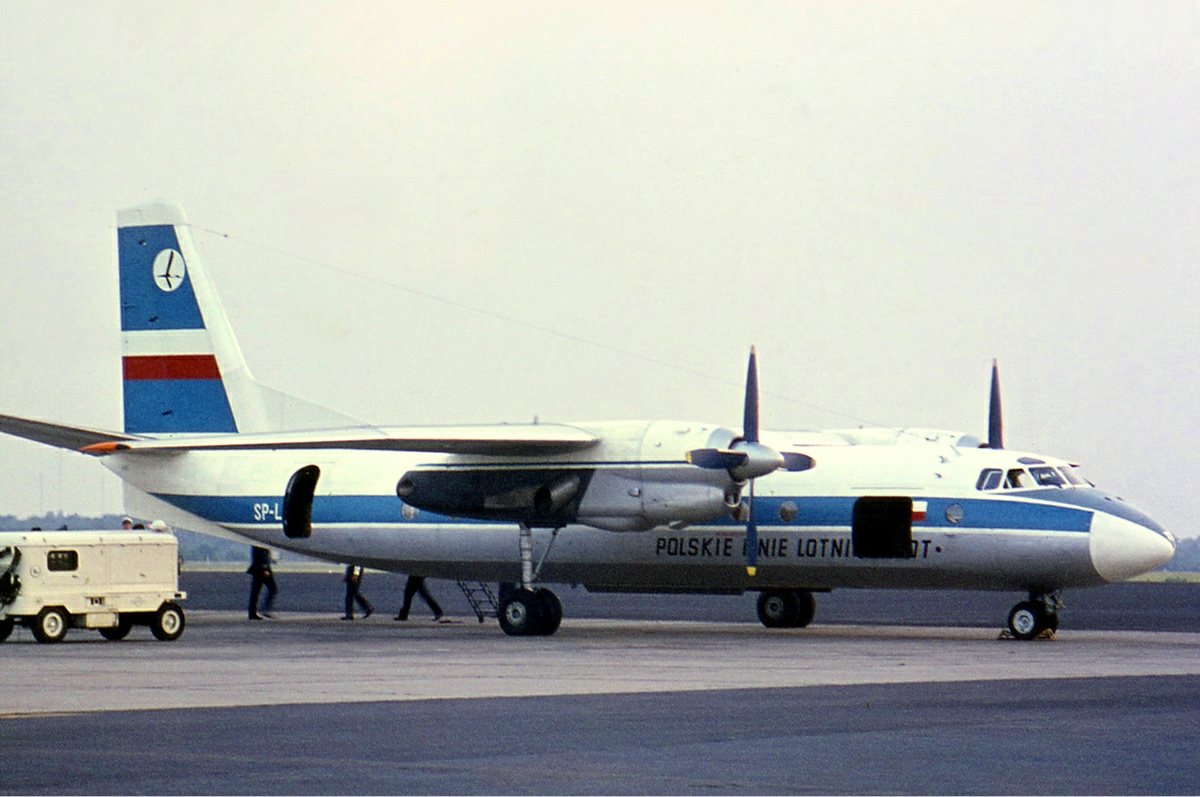
- A LOT Polish Airlines Antonov An-24, similar to the one involved

Accident
- Date: 24 January 1969
- Summary: Controlled flight into terrain during approach due to pilot error
- Site: near Strachowice Airport, Wrocław, Poland

Aircraft
- Aircraft type: Antonov An-24B
- Operator: LOT Polish Airlines
- Registration: SP-LTE
- Flight origin: Okęcie Airport, Warsaw, Poland
- Destination: Strachowice Airport, Wrocław, Poland
- Occupants: 48
- Passengers: 44
- Crew: 4
- Fatalities: 0
- Injuries: 3
- Survivors: 48

LOT Polish Airlines Flight 149 was a scheduled domestic passenger flight from Okęcie, Warsaw to Strachowice, Wrocław. On 24 January 1969, the airliner contacted with trees. While trying to recover, it struck a power line, tearing apart the whole right wing and crashed into a 70-centimeter-high road embankment before came to rest across a road. Three injuries were reported, but no one died.

== Aircraft ==
The aircraft involved was the Antonov An-24B manufactured in March 1966. It was sold to the Polish People's Republic, where it was delivered to LOT Polish Airlines on April 9. It was the fifth aircraft of this type in the airline's fleet. The aircraft had logged 3,018 flight hours at the time of the accident.

== Crew ==
The captain was 34-year-old Rudolf Rembieliński. He held a valid pilot-in-command rating for Li-2 , C-47 , Il-14 , and An-24 aircraft. He had 9,500 hours of total flight experience, including 1,302 hours as a captain; 2,000 hours of experience on the An-24, including 1,567 hours as a pilot. He had not flown in the past 24 hours, but had previously been on duty at the airfield for 2 hours.

The first officer was 31-year-old Czesław Kamiński. He held a valid An-24 second pilot qualification and had 3,000 hours of total flight time as an An-24 first officer.

On board also includes the flight engineer Henrik Kruk.

== Accident ==
The plane took off from Okęcie Airport at 16:35, carrying 44 passengers and 4 crew members. The flight proceeded without deviations and 10 minutes before reaching the airport's non-directional radio beacon, the crew received permission from the area control center to descend from 4,500 meters (14,760 feet) to 1,500 meters (4,920 feet) and to switch to communication with the air traffic controller. After establishing contact with the air traffic controller, the pilots also received permission to descend to 1,500 (4,920 feet) meters with a report of passing the radio beacon. The crew reported passing the radio beacon at 17:22, after which the air traffic controller transmitted the latest weather data: cloud cover with a lower boundary of 150 meters, fog, haze, visibility up to 1,600 meters, wind 300°-310° 3-4 m/s (6-8 knots), airfield pressure 765.5 mm Hg.

The pilots set the altimeter pressure, after which the ground was informed that they had begun their descent to the GNSS when the air traffic controller warned that visibility had dropped to 800 meters. This was below the airport's weather minimum of 1,100 meters, but the crew continued their descent, and at an altitude of 90 meters (300 feet), the captain ordered the engine power to be reduced. The GNSS was passed at an altitude of 50-60 meters (160-200 feet), instead of the specified 225 meters (740 feet), after which the aircraft entered fog. As the captain later recounted at the hearing, visibility in the fog had already dropped to 400 meters, but the crew continued their approach. When the flight engineer reported an altitude of 30 meters (100 feet). The captain pulled back on the control column to halt the descent by raising the nose, but 700 meters beyond the outer locator beacon, the aircraft, still descending, struck the right wing of the aircraft into the trees at an altitude of 10 meters (32 feet). The impact separated a three-meter-long section of the wing, after which the airliner entered a steep right bank of up to 40°, losing altitude. 145 meters from the initial impact point, the right wing struck the ground, leaving a 41-meter-long furrow, after which the crew briefly righted the aircraft. But then the right bank began to increase again, and the right wing, having struck the ground, began to disintegrate. 350 meters from the initial impact point, the airliner, banking to the right, struck a 30 kV power line, snapping several cables, and then raced over Wrocław Zachodni railway station of the 2-track Wrocław Świebodzki–Zgorzelec railway, tearing down the overhead contact wires and communication lines. Entangled in the wires, the right wing separated. Having significantly lost speed as a result, the airliner righted itself, then lowered its landing gear to the ground, skidding for 141 meters before crashing into a 70-centimeter-high road embankment and finally coming to a stop across the road.

The plane crashed at 17:30, 3.5 kilometers from Strachowice Airport. Both pilots and one passenger were injured, but no one was killed.

== Investigations ==
According to the results of the technical examination, the aircraft was fully operational before the collision with the trees, and there were no equipment failures on board.

According to the Polish commission's conclusion, the accident occurred primarily due to the fault of the pilot-in-command, who continued to conduct the landing approach in weather conditions worse than the airport's meteorological minimum, without monitoring his altitude, resulting in the aircraft passing the outer directional beacon at an altitude significantly lower than the established altitude. The second pilot demonstrated passivity in this situation, failing to intervene with the pilot-in-command and making no attempt to rectify the situation.

No recommendations were made to prevent similar incidents in the future, and the pilots themselves were soon stripped of their flight certificates.
