= Mokronos Górny railway station =

Railway station in Mokronos Górny, Poland

Mokronos Górny
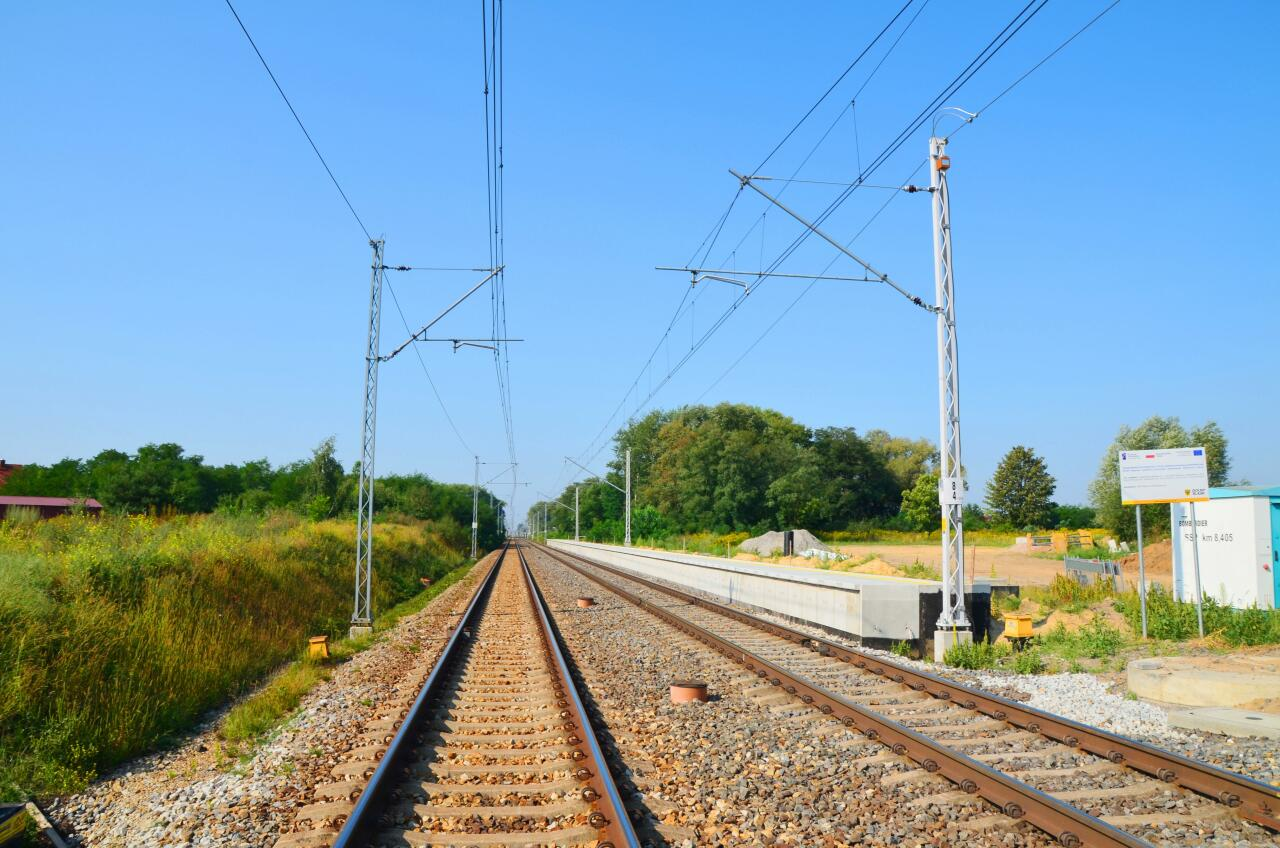
- Station under construction in August 2019

General information
- Location: Mokronos Górny, Lower Silesian Voivodeship; Poland
- Coordinates: 51°04′43.1″N 16°54′31.0″E
- Owner: Polish State Railways
- Line: Wrocław Świebodzki–Zgorzelec
- Platforms: 2

History
- Opened: 15 December 2019
Location
- Location within Poland Location within Lower Silesian Voivodeship

Mokronos Górny is a railway station on the Wrocław Świebodzki–Zgorzelec railway in the village of Mokronos Górny, Wrocław County in the Lower Silesian Voivodeship in south-western Poland.

== History ==
In September 2018, Polish State Railways signed a contract for the construction of Mokronos Górny railway station, at a cost of approximately 3.5 million PLN, fully funded by the Regional Operational Programme of the Lower Silesian Voivodeship, as part of the Integrated Territorial Investments of the Wrocław metropolitan area. The project also included the reconstruction of the tracks and overhead wires adjacent to the station, and the modernisation of the adjacent level crossing.

The station opened on 15 December 2019 together with three other new stations across the voivodeship, part of the train timetable change. It was noted that the journey time from Mokronos Górny to Wrocław Główny is about 11–13 minutes by Lower Silesian Railways, less than half it is by road.

== Station ==
Mokronos Górny a railway halt on the Wrocław Świebodzki–Zgorzelec railway. It has two high-level side platforms each at a length of 150 metres (490 ft), in a staggered layout.

== Train services ==
The station is served by the following services:

- Regional services (KD) Wrocław - Wałbrzych - Jelenia Góra
- Regional services (KD) Wrocław - Jaworzyna Śląska - Świdnica - Bielawa Góry Sowie
- Regional services (KD) Wrocław - Wałbrzych - Jelenia Góra - Szklarska Poręba Górna
- Regional services (KD) Wrocław - Jaworzyna Śląska - Świdnica - Głuszyca

Preceding station	KD	Following station
Wrocław Zachodni towards Wrocław Główny	D6	Smolec towards Jelenia Góra
Wrocław Zachodni towards Wrocław Główny	D40	Smolec towards Bielawa Góry Sowie
Wrocław Zachodni towards Wrocław Główny	D60	Smolec towards Szklarska Poręba Górna
Wrocław Zachodni towards Wrocław Główny	D64	Smolec towards Głuszyca
