= Wałbrzych Szczawienko railway station =

Railway station in Wałbrzych, Poland

Wałbrzych Szczawienko
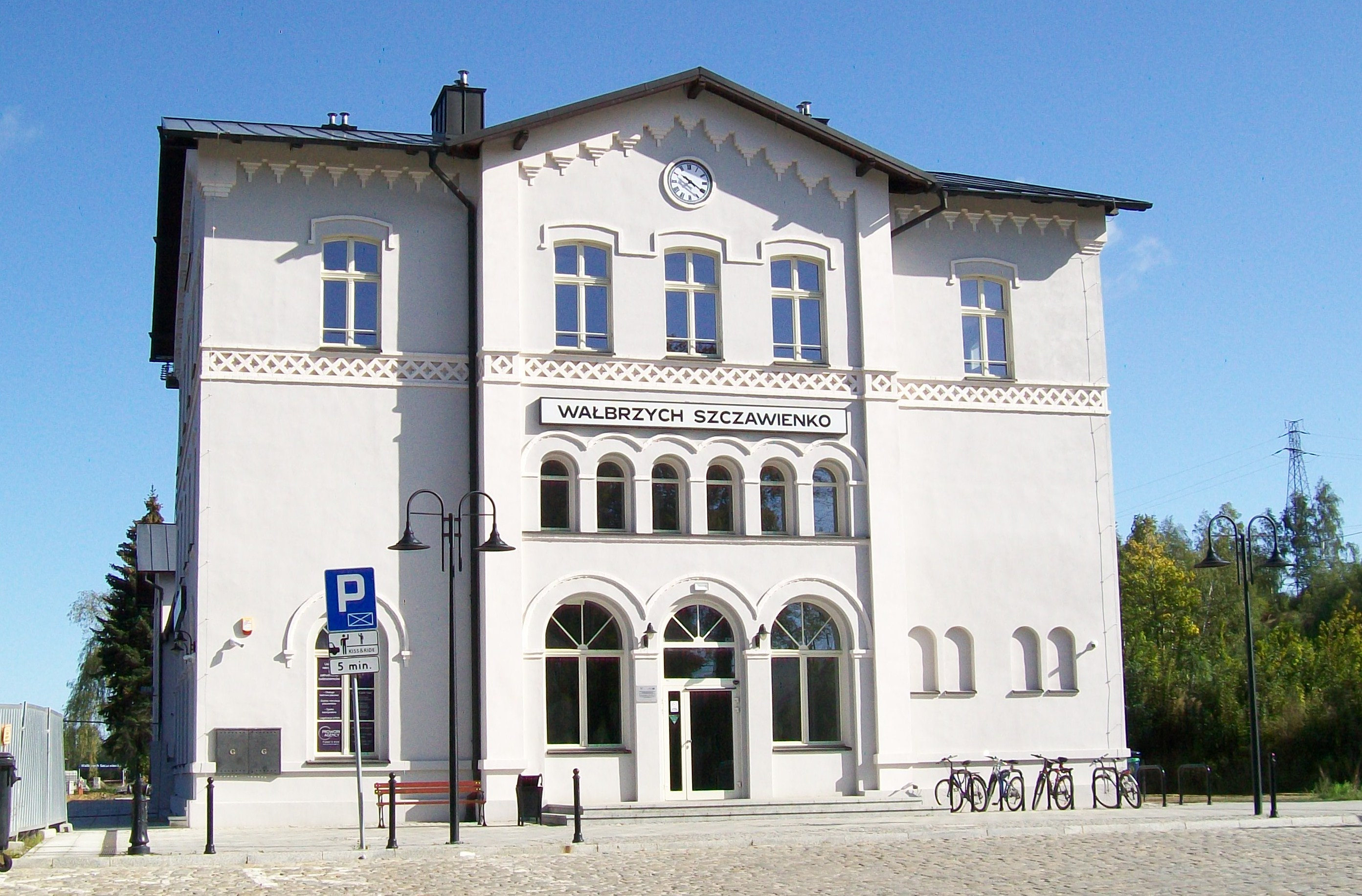
- Renovated station building in 2019

General information
- Location: Szczawienko, Wałbrzych, Lower Silesian Voivodeship; Poland
- Coordinates: 50°48′57.0″N 16°18′08.0″E
- Owner: Polish State Railways
- Lines: Wrocław Świebodzki–Zgorzelec; Boguszów-Gorce Wschód–Mieroszów
- Platforms: 3

History
- Opened: 1 March 1853
- Former names: Sorgau (1853–1895); Nieder Salzbrunn (1895–1945); Słońsk Dolny (1945–1946); Szczawno Śląskie Dolne (1946–1947); Szczawienko (1947–1966)

Services
Preceding station	KD	Following station
Świebodzice towards Wrocław Główny	D6	Wałbrzych Miasto towards Jelenia Góra
Świebodzice towards Wrocław Główny	D60	Wałbrzych Miasto towards Szklarska Poręba Górna
Location
- Location within Poland Location within Lower Silesian Voivodeship

Wałbrzych Szczawienko is a railway station in the Szczawienko district of Wałbrzych, within the Lower Silesian Voivodeship in south-western Poland.

== History ==
The station was opened by the Wrocław-Świdnica-Świebodzice Railway Company as Sorgau on 1 March 1853. It was renamed to Nieder Salzbrunn in 1895. After World War II, the area came under Polish administration. As a result, the station was taken over by Polish State Railways and was renamed to Słońsk Dolny. The station was renamed three more times: Szczawno Śląskie (1946), Szczawienko (1947), and finally to its modern name, Wałbrzych Szczawienko, in 1966.

In 2015, "Nazi gold train" renewed global media interest when two men claimed to have discovered it using ground-penetrating radar, which was near the station. Excavations soon began in search of the train, however, it soon halted after it was confirmed that the anomaly was found to be natural geology.

On 30 December 2015, the station building was taken over by the city of Wałbrzych, in preparation for its renovation. Renovation works began in November 2016. The newly renovated building opened on 16 April 2018.

On 29 September 2017, PKP Polskie Linie Kolejowe signed a contract for the modernisation of the line and infrastructure at the station. The works were completed in 2020.

== Train services ==
The station is served by the following services:

- Regional services (KD) Wrocław - Wałbrzych - Jelenia Góra
- Regional services (KD) Wrocław - Wałbrzych - Jelenia Góra - Szklarska Poręba Górna
