= Mokronos Górny =

- Village
- Location within Poland
- Coordinates: 51°04′33″N 16°54′59″E
- Country: Poland
- Voivodeship: Lower Silesian
- County: Wrocław
- Gmina: Kąty Wrocławskie
- Elevation: 124 m (407 ft)
- Population: 432

Mokronos Górny [mɔˈkrɔnɔs ˈɡurnɨ] is a village in the administrative district of Gmina Kąty Wrocławskie, within Wrocław County, Lower Silesian Voivodeship, in southwestern Poland.

The village is served by Mokronos Górny railway station.
