= Imbramowice railway station =

Railway station in Imbramowice, Poland

Imbramowice
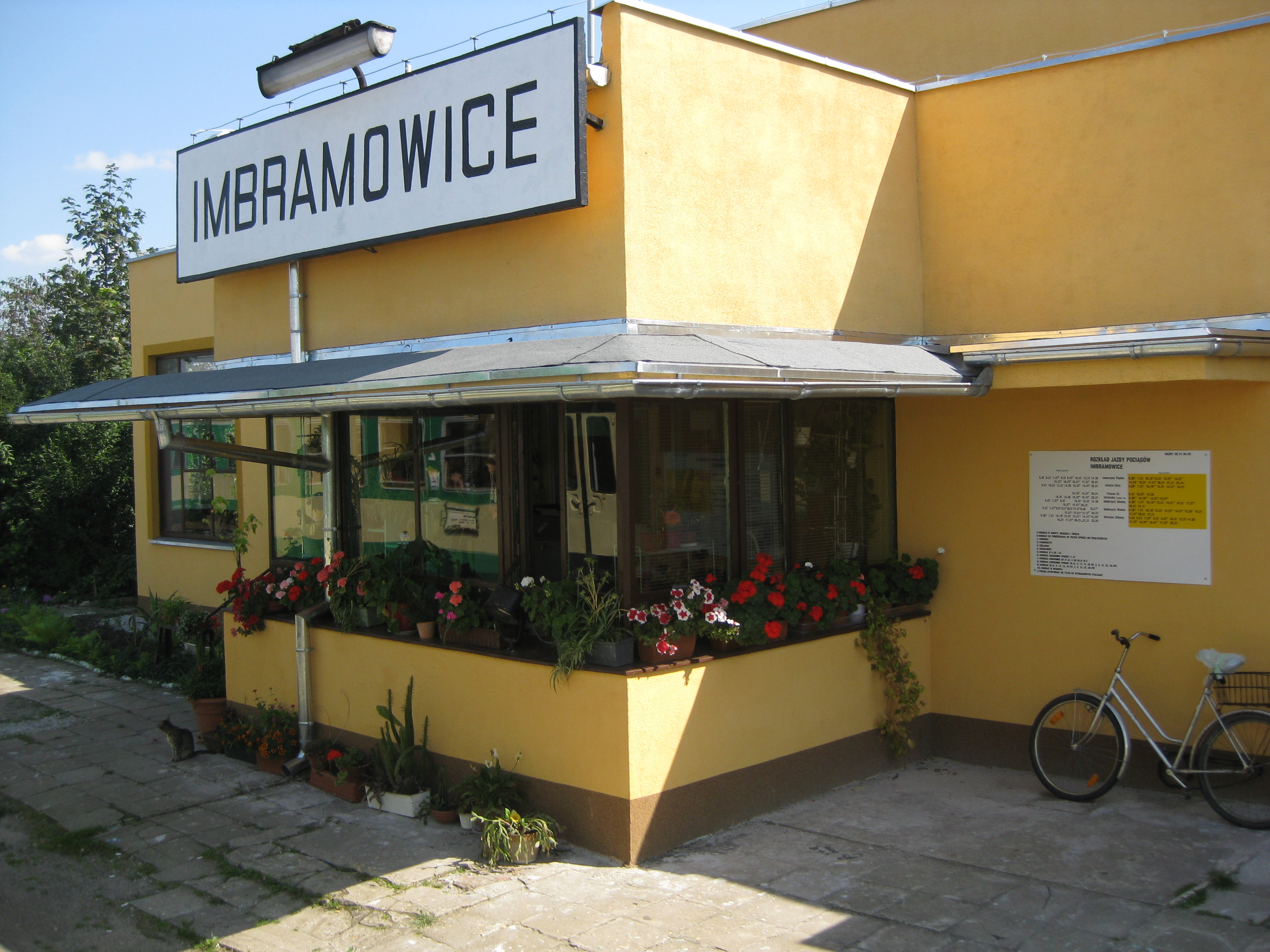
- Station building in 2009, prior to its reconstruction

General information
- Location: Imbramowice, Lower Silesian Voivodeship; Poland
- Coordinates: 50°57′48.0″N 16°34′44.0″E
- Owner: Polish State Railways
- Line: Wrocław Świebodzki–Zgorzelec
- Platforms: 2

History
- Opened: 29 October 1843
- Former names: Ingramsdorf (1843–1945); Ingramowice (1945–1947)
Location
- Location within Poland Location within Lower Silesian Voivodeship

Imbramowice is a railway station on the Wrocław Świebodzki–Zgorzelec railway in the village of Imbramowice, Świdnica County, within the Lower Silesian Voivodeship in south-western Poland.

== History ==
The station was opened by the Wrocław-Świdnica-Świebodzice Railway Company as Ingramsdorf on 29 October 1843. After World War II, the area came under Polish administration. As a result, the station was taken over by Polish State Railways (PKP) and was renamed to Ingramowice, later renamed to its modern name, Imbramowice, in 1947. The original multi-storey station building dating back to 1843 was demolished and rebuilt in 1945 to a smaller single-storey station building.

Modernisation of the station infrastructure was completed in 2017, which included the reconstruction of new platforms and new track. In October 2019, PKP signed a contract for the reconstruction of the station building. Work began in early November—the new station building opened in February 2021—costing approximately 6.4 million złoty, financed by the European Union.

== Train services ==
The station is served by the following services:

- Regional services (KD) Wrocław - Wałbrzych - Jelenia Góra
- Regional services (KD) Wrocław - Jaworzyna Śląska - Świdnica - Bielawa Góry Sowie
- Regional services (KD) Wrocław - Wałbrzych - Jelenia Góra - Szklarska Poręba Górna
- Regional services (KD) Wrocław - Jaworzyna Śląska - Świdnica - Głuszyca

Preceding station	KD	Following station
Mietków towards Wrocław Główny	D6	Żarów towards Jelenia Góra
Mietków towards Wrocław Główny	D40	Żarów towards Bielawa Góry Sowie
Mietków towards Wrocław Główny	D60	Żarów towards Szklarska Poręba Górna
Mietków towards Wrocław Główny	D64	Żarów towards Głuszyca
