= Smolec =

- Village
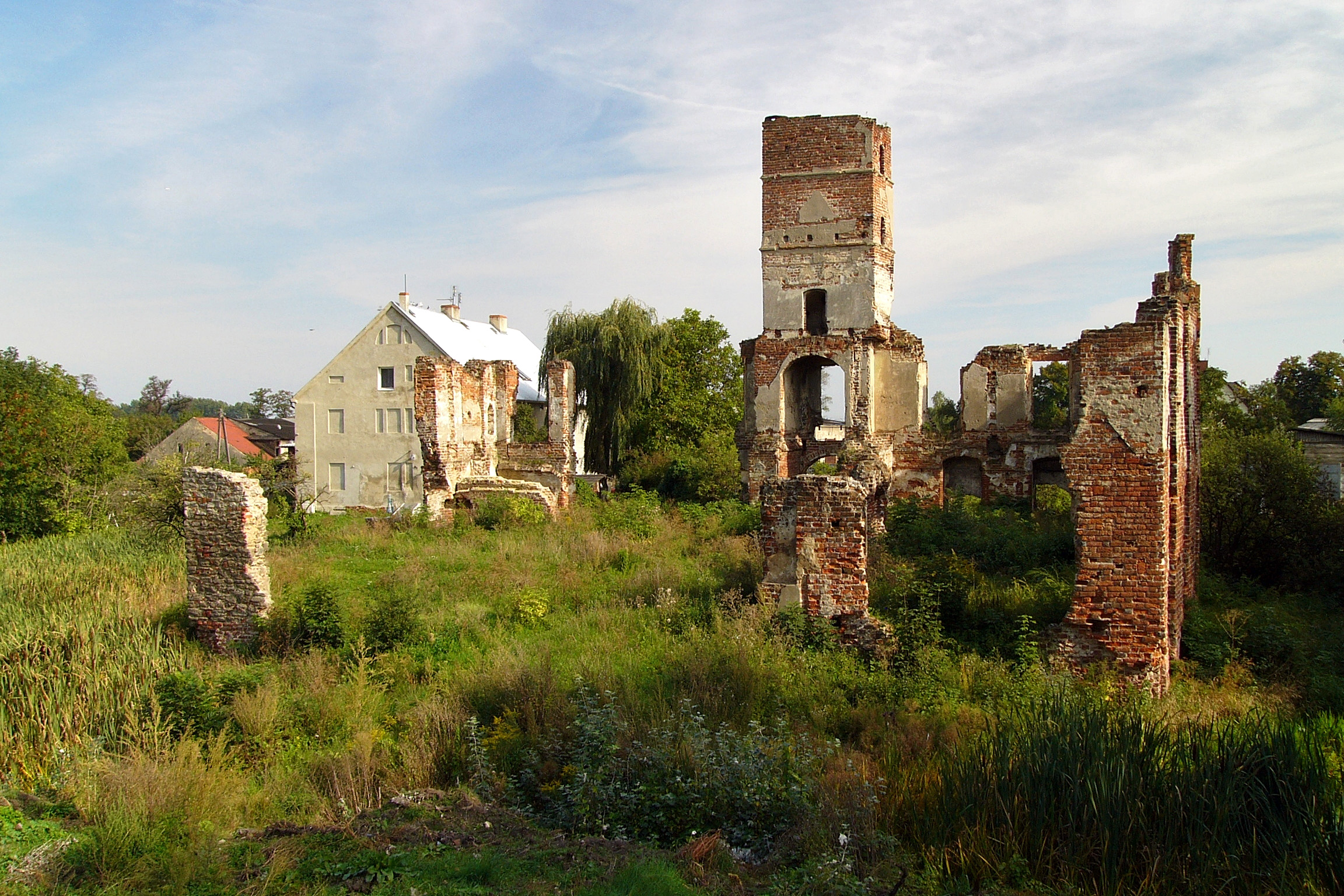
- Castle ruins in Smolec

- Location within Poland
- Coordinates: 51°5′N 16°53′E
- Country: Poland
- Voivodeship: Lower Silesian
- County: Wrocław
- Gmina: Kąty Wrocławskie

Population (approx.)
  - Total: 6,512
- Time zone: UTC+1 (CET)
  - Summer (DST): UTC+2 (CEST)
- Postal code: 55-080
- Vehicle registration: DWR
- Website: http://www.smolec.pl

Smolec [ˈsmɔlɛt͡s] is a village in the administrative district of Gmina Kąty Wrocławskie, within Wrocław County, Lower Silesian Voivodeship, in south-western Poland.

== Name history ==
The first historical mention of Smolec dates back to 1323, in a Latin document and the village is referred to as Smolz. The village is referred to as Smolcz in 1324 and 1326. It is referred to as Smolicz in 1328, Schmolz in 1336, Schmolz in 1337, in 1736 and 1630 Smoltz, in 1795 Smoltsch, and in 1795 and 1802 as Schmoltsch.

== Attractions ==
The Ruiny zamku Smolec is a key site in Smolec, with history going back to the 14th century and further expansions and renovations of the castle in the 16th, 18th and 19th centuries. The castle stands in ruins today, it was destroyed in WWII but, the site is still preserved today. It sits in a quiet park and it remains a popular spot in the village.

== Transport ==
The village is served by Smolec railway station.

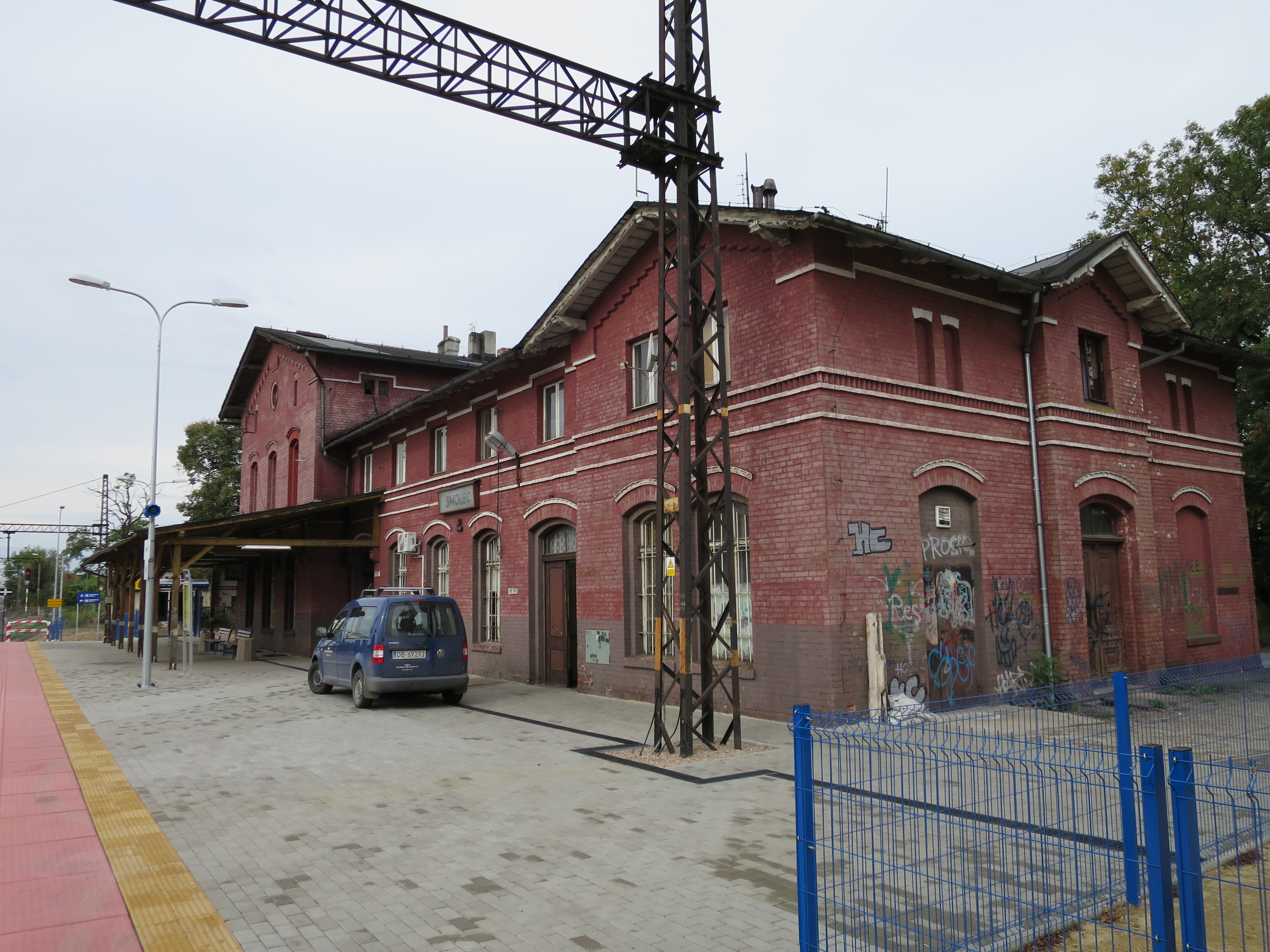
Smolec train station hall
