= Wrocław Zachodni railway station =

Railway station in Muchobór Wielki, Wrocław, Poland

Wrocław Zachodni
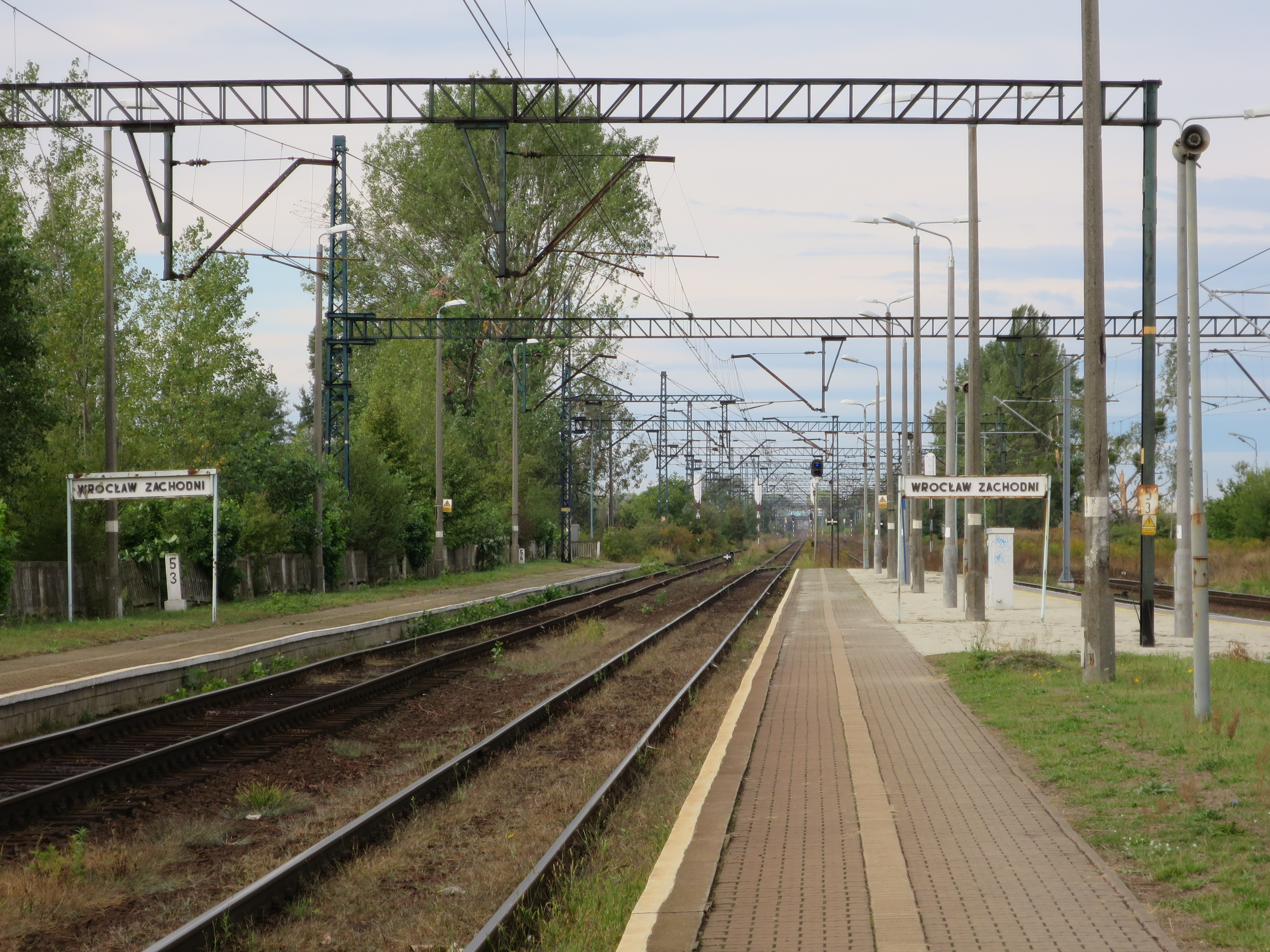
- Platforms in August 2015

General information
- Location: Muchobór Wielki, Wrocław, Lower Silesian Voivodeship; Poland
- Coordinates: 51°05′25.4″N 16°57′01.7″E
- Owner: Polish State Railways
- Line: Wrocław Świebodzki–Zgorzelec
- Platforms: 2

History
- Opened: 15 November 1896
- Former names: Groß Mochbern (1896–1936); Lohbrück (1936–1945); Ślęsk (1945–1947); Muchobór Wielki (1947–1974)
Location
- Location within Poland Location within Lower Silesian Voivodeship

Wrocław Zachodni (lit. 'Wrocław West') is a railway station in the Muchobór Wielki district of Wrocław in the Lower Silesian Voivodeship in south-western Poland.

Multiple sidings branch off the station, including to Wrocław Airport, the only railway connection to it. The Wrocław Gądów–Wrocław Zachodni railway, the only freight-only railway line in Wrocław connects the station with Wrocław Gądów, a major freight yard.

== History ==
The station was opened by Prussian State Railways as Groß Mochbern on 15 November 1896. It was renamed to Lohbrück in 1936. After World War II, the area came under Polish administration. As a result, the station was taken over by Polish State Railways (PKP) and was renamed to Ślęsk, and later to Muchobór Wielki in 1947.

On 24 January 1969, LOT Polish Airlines Flight 149 struck the overhead wires at Wrocław Zachodni due to the plane's extremely low altitude whilst landing at Wrocław Airport. No ground injuries at the station occurred, although four were injured on board the flight.

== Accidents and incidents ==
- On 5 August 2006 the leading locomotive of a freight train collided into the buffer stop of a siding at the station, after the drive failed to stop in time, resulting in the derailment of the train and its wagons. No one was injured.

== Train services ==
The station is served by the following services:

- Regional services (KD) Wrocław - Wałbrzych - Jelenia Góra
- Regional services (KD) Wrocław - Jaworzyna Śląska - Świdnica - Bielawa Góry Sowie
- Regional services (KD) Wrocław - Wałbrzych - Jelenia Góra - Szklarska Poręba Górna
- Regional services (KD) Wrocław - Jaworzyna Śląska - Świdnica - Głuszyca

Preceding station	KD	Following station
Wrocław Grabiszyn towards Wrocław Główny	D6	Mokronos Górny towards Jelenia Góra
Wrocław Grabiszyn towards Wrocław Główny	D40	Mokronos Górny towards Bielawa Góry Sowie
Wrocław Grabiszyn towards Wrocław Główny	D60	Mokronos Górny towards Szklarska Poręba Górna
Wrocław Grabiszyn towards Wrocław Główny	D64	Mokronos Górny towards Głuszyca
