= Sadowice, Wrocław County =

Sadowice
- Village
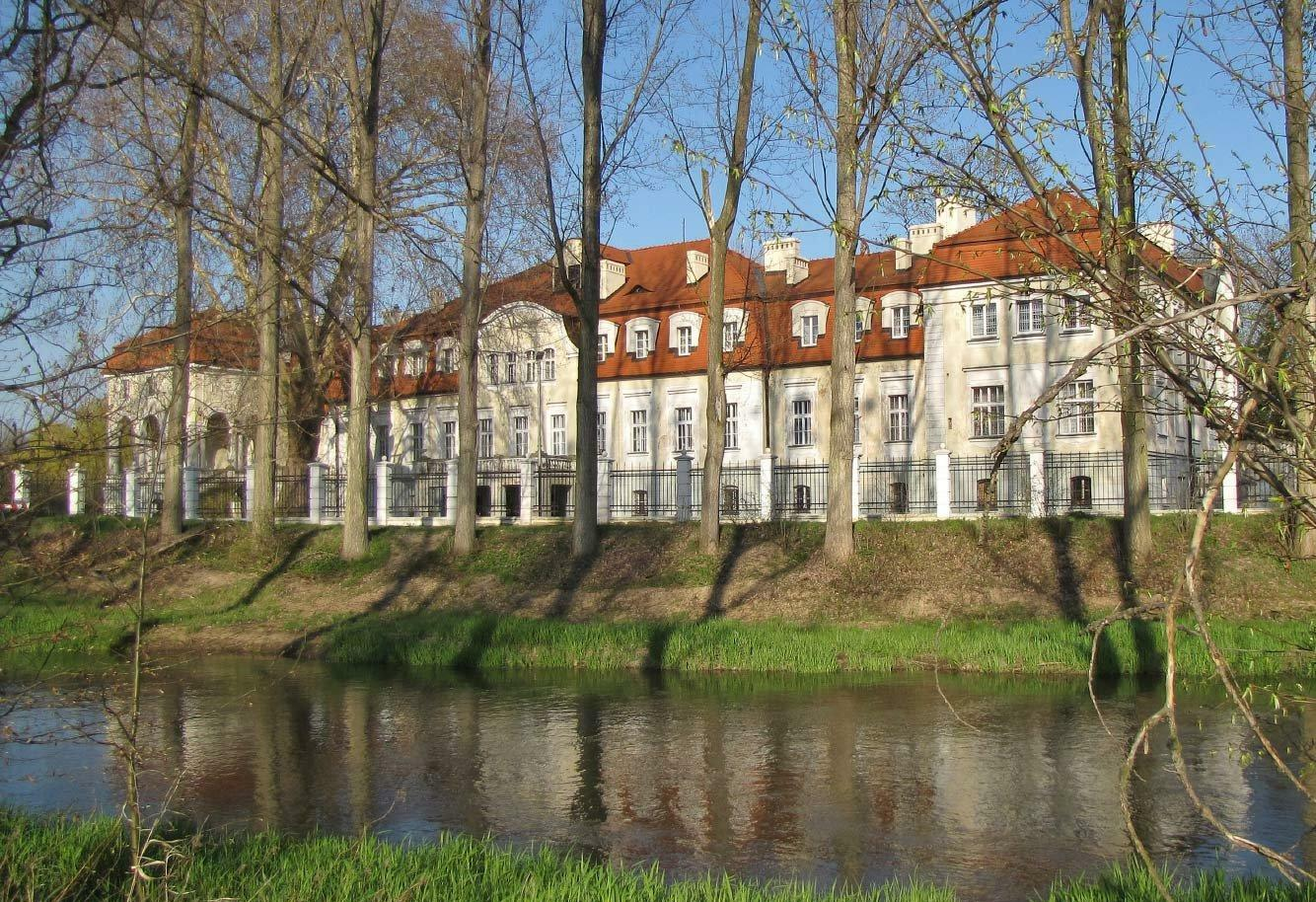
- Sadowice, PałacZakład Poprawczy Ministerstwa Sprawiedliwości

- Location within Poland
- Coordinates: 51°3′32″N 16°48′12″E
- Country: Poland
- Voivodeship: Lower Silesian
- County: Wrocław
- Gmina: Kąty Wrocławskie
- Population: 374

Sadowice [sadɔˈvit͡sɛ] is a village in the administrative district of Gmina Kąty Wrocławskie, within Wrocław County, Lower Silesian Voivodeship, in south-western Poland.
