= Jaworzyna Śląska railway station =

Railway station in Jaworzyna Śląska, Poland

Jaworzyna Śląska
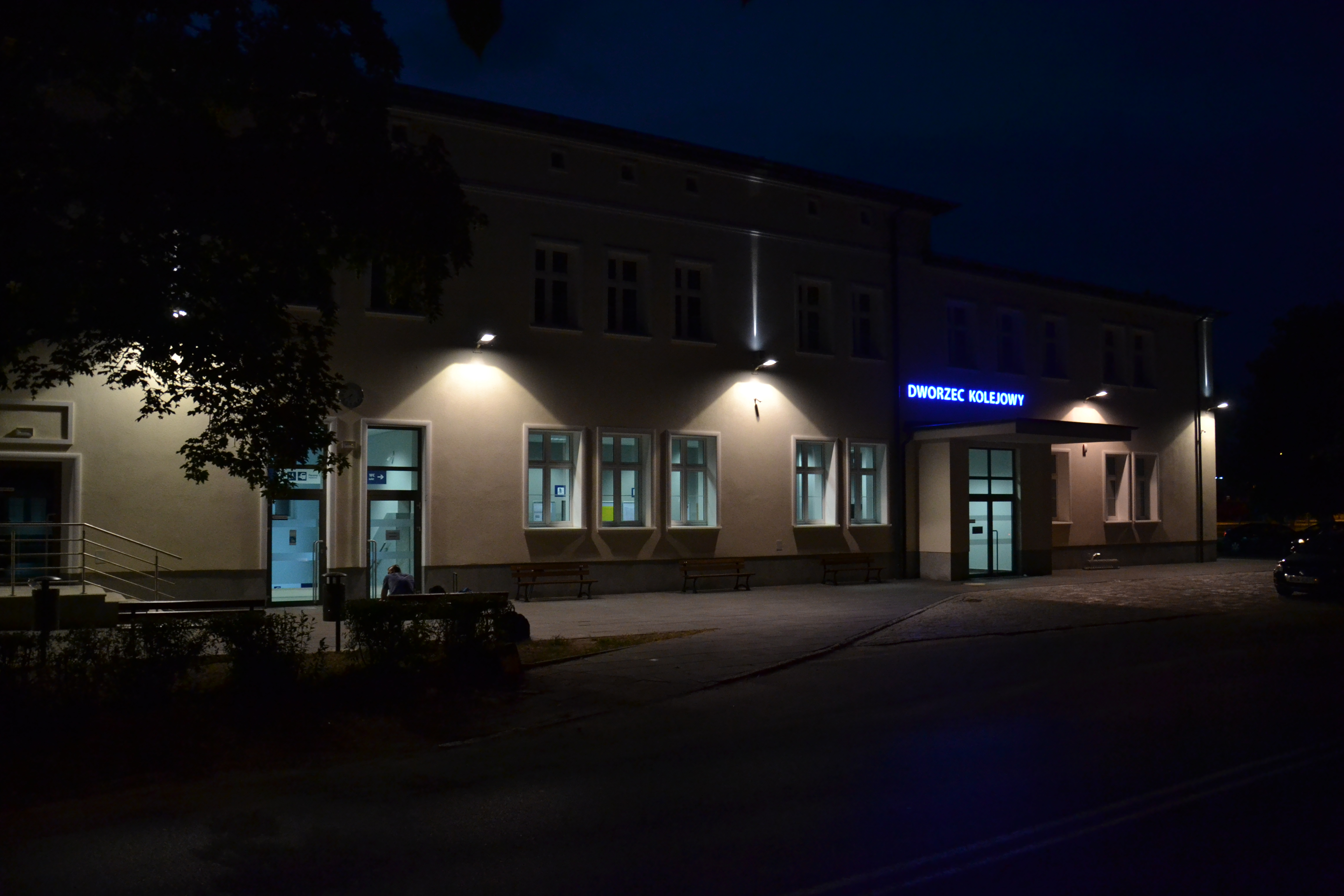
- Station building in 2015

General information
- Location: Jaworzyna Śląska, Lower Silesian Voivodeship; Poland
- Coordinates: 50°54′44.0″N 16°25′45.0″E
- Owner: Polish State Railways
- Lines: Wrocław Świebodzki–Zgorzelec; Katowice–Legnica
- Platforms: 6

History
- Opened: 29 October 1843
- Former names: Königszelt (1842–1945); Jawornik Świdncki (1945–1946)
Location
- Location within Poland Location within Lower Silesian Voivodeship

Jaworzyna Śląska is a railway station in the town of Jaworzyna Śląska, Świdnica County, within the Lower Silesian Voivodeship in south-western Poland. It is the final station of the Lower Silesian Agglomeration Railway.

== History ==
The station was opened by the Wrocław-Świdnica-Świebodzice Railway Company as Königszelt on 29 October 1843. Two locomotive roundhouses operated at the station, one directly adjacent, and the other now used by the Silesian Railway Museum.

After World War II, the area came under Polish administration. As a result, the station was taken over by Polish State Railways (PKP) and was renamed to Jawornik Świdnicki, were the station was renamed once again, to its modern name, Jaworzyna Śląska, in 1946.

In 2005, the Silesian Railway Museum was founded. It leased one of the historical disused locomotive roundhouses to host its exhibitions.

On 2 July 2026, a fire broke out at the station locomotive roundhouse, resulting in the damage of roadwork equipment which at the time was stored in the building. 23 fire brigade units responded to the incident, containing the fire preventing it from spreading further.

== Train services ==
The station is served by the following services:

- Regional services (KD) Wrocław - Wałbrzych - Jelenia Góra
- Regional services (KD) Wrocław - Jaworzyna Śląska - Świdnica - Bielawa Góry Sowie
- Regional services (KD) Wrocław - Wałbrzych - Jelenia Góra - Szklarska Poręba Górna
- Regional services (KD) Wrocław - Jaworzyna Śląska - Świdnica - Głuszyca
- Regional services (KD) Legnica - Świdnica - Kłodzko

Preceding station	KD	Following station
Żarów towards Wrocław Główny	D6	Świebodzice towards Jelenia Góra
Żarów towards Wrocław Główny	D40	Bolesławice Świdnickie towards Bielawa Góry Sowie
Żarów towards Wrocław Główny	D60	Świebodzice towards Szklarska Poręba Górna
Żarów towards Wrocław Główny	D64	Bolesławice Świdnickie towards Głuszyca
Stanowice towards Legnica	D91	Bolesławice Świdnickie towards Kłodzko Miasto
