= Imbramowice, Lower Silesian Voivodeship =

Imbramowice
- Village
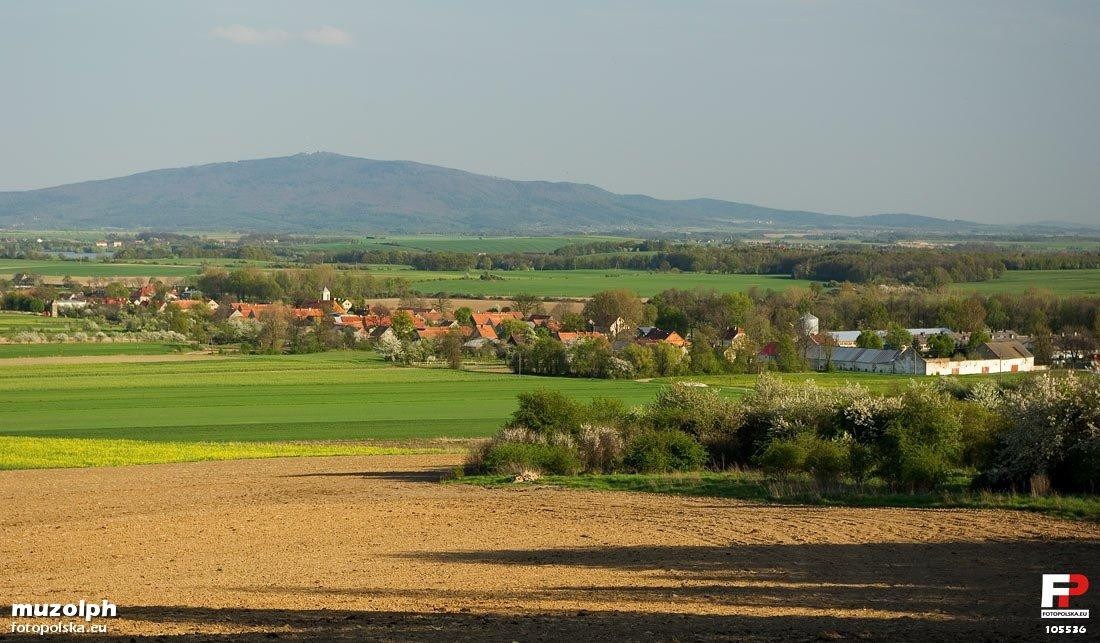

- Location within Poland
- Coordinates: 50°58′06″N 16°34′00″E
- Country: Poland
- Voivodeship: Lower Silesian
- County: Świdnica
- Gmina: Żarów

Imbramowice [imbramɔˈvit͡sɛ] is a village in the administrative district of Gmina Żarów, within Świdnica County, Lower Silesian Voivodeship, in south-western Poland. It is served by Imbramowice railway station.
