= Wrocław-Świdnica-Świebodzice Railway Company =

Former private railway company in Prussia

Breslau–Schweidnitz–Freiburger Eisenbahngesellschaft
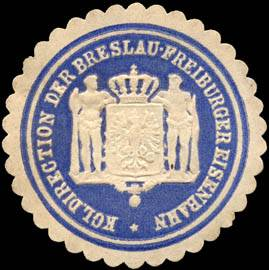

Overview
- Main region: Province of Silesia
- Headquarters: Wrocław
- Locale: Kingdom of Prussia
- Dates of operation: 17 March 1842–1 July 1886
- Successor: Prussian State Railways

The Wrocław-Świdnica-Świebodzice Railway Company (German: Breslau–Schweidnitz–Freiburger Eisenbahngesellschaft; BSFE) was a private railway company based in the Kingdom of Prussia, that was established to build and operate a railway line connecting Wrocław with the Sudeten Foreland, a region rich in raw materials.

The company’s operations centered on the construction and operation of railway lines—notably the Silesian Mountain Railway—enabling the transport of bituminous coal from the surrounding area of Wałbrzych towards Wrocław and the Baltic sea. The company operated both passenger and freight trains.

Like most Prussian private railways established under the Act of 1830, the company was nationalized in 1884, subsequently dissolved, and incorporated into the Prussian state railways on 1st July 1886.

== History ==
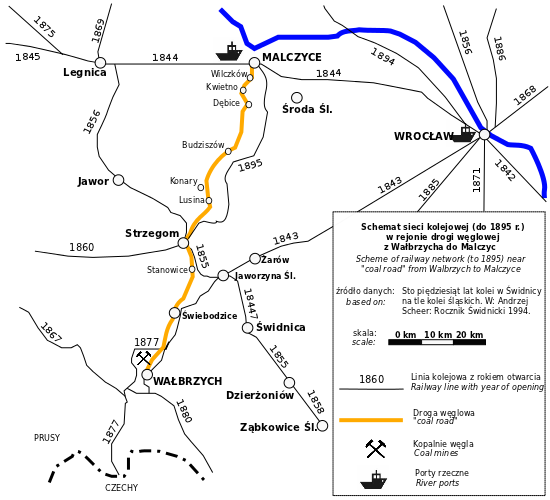
Diagram of the rail network (to 1895) in the area of the so-called "Coal road" from Wałbrzych to Malczyce

=== Origins ===
The direct premise for establishing the Wrocław-Świdnica-Świebodzice Railway was the need to connect the Sudeten Forelands, the most industrialized region of Lower Silesia in the mid-19th century, with Wrocław and other markets. Over time, the existing horse-drawn transport along the so-called "coal roads" dating back to the 18th century wasn't enough.

In 1816, the Prussian Mining Administration commissioned Johann Friedrich Krigar of the Royal Iron Foundry in Berlin to build a steam locomotive intended for rack railway, based on earlier observations of the first successful British Salamanca locomotive. In spring the same year, the Royal Upper Mining Office for Silesia (German: Königliches Oberbergamt für Schlesien) proposed to the central authorities to use the invention to transport coal from the Wałbrzych coal basin to the port in Malczyce. Krigar’s completed machine, the first steam locomotive built on the European continent outside Great Britian, was transported to Chorzów to serve the Royal Ironworks following demonstrations in Berlin. However, the locomotive had to be dismantled for transport, where it couldn't start after being reassembled, which led the work implementing on railway technology to a halt.

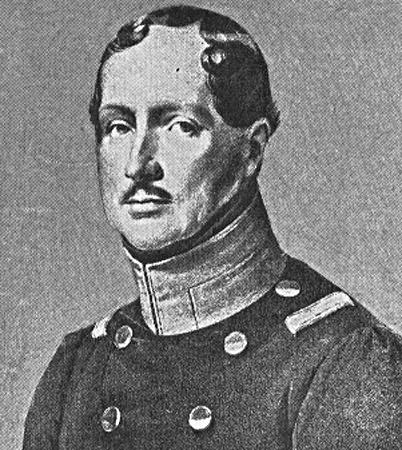
Frederick William III

Also significant was the hostility towards railways harbored by the conservative circle surrounding the King Frederick William III, who generally hailed from the landed gentry, as well as the monarch’s own skepticism regarding the invention's practicality. The King reportedly said as follows on the proposal to build what would later prove to be the first railway connection in Prussia:

Nonsense! I do not understand how could anyone be happy by the fact that one arrives in Potsdam [from Berlin] a few hours earlier?

— Frederick William III, King of Prussia from 1797 to 1840,

The indebted Prussian state, wary of the new invention, saw no interest in adopting it, preferring instead to develop inland navigation and a network of improved roads. However, the news of George Stephenson’s successes and the expansion of railways in Great Britain, reaching capitalists in Prussia’s industrial regions between the 1820s and 1830s, gained dissatisfaction with existing types of transport and intensified pressure on the royal authorities to authorize railway construction in Prussia.

=== Company establishment ===
In 1830, among three proposals for transport links originating in Wrocław (directed towards the Prussian capital and Upper Silesia) that were officially submitted to the authorities in Berlin, there was a petition from Wrocław merchants calling for the construction of a railway connection linking Świebodzice with Malczyce and Wrocław. The group was led by a man named Friesner (whose first name is unknown), who died shortly after making the proposal. The minister of State Rother, head of the Department for Trade, Manufacturing, and Construction within the Ministry of the Interior, rejected the proposal on the grounds that its economic rationale was insufficiently developed. Moreover, given the limited funds available at the time, state authorities favored investing in the Wrocław–Berlin railway line, whereas Friesner’s project was deemed to be a local significance.

Subsequent years brought other ideas for the connection—previously not seriously considered, involving either a cable car or a conventional railway, but following a circuitous route via Olbrachtowice, Sobótka, and Świdnica.

In 1835, the idea of connecting Baltic Sea ports with Adriatic Sea ports via the shortest possible route gained popularity in Prussia. The concept was embraced by the initiators of the Świebodzice railway project as a way to ensure the venture's success. In March 1837, led by industrialist Gustav Heinrich von Ruffer, who was actively involved in railway investments, merchants from Wrocław and Świebodzice established a railway construction committee in the capital of Lower Silesia.

Share subscriptions for the company began in January 1841. The company initially encountered difficulties in raising funds for construction due to competition from the Upper Silesian Railway, which attracted greater investor interest (625 BSFE shareholders compared to 1,089 OSE shareholders). Through share sales, the company managed to raise half of the projected initial capital, namely, 1.25 million thalers.

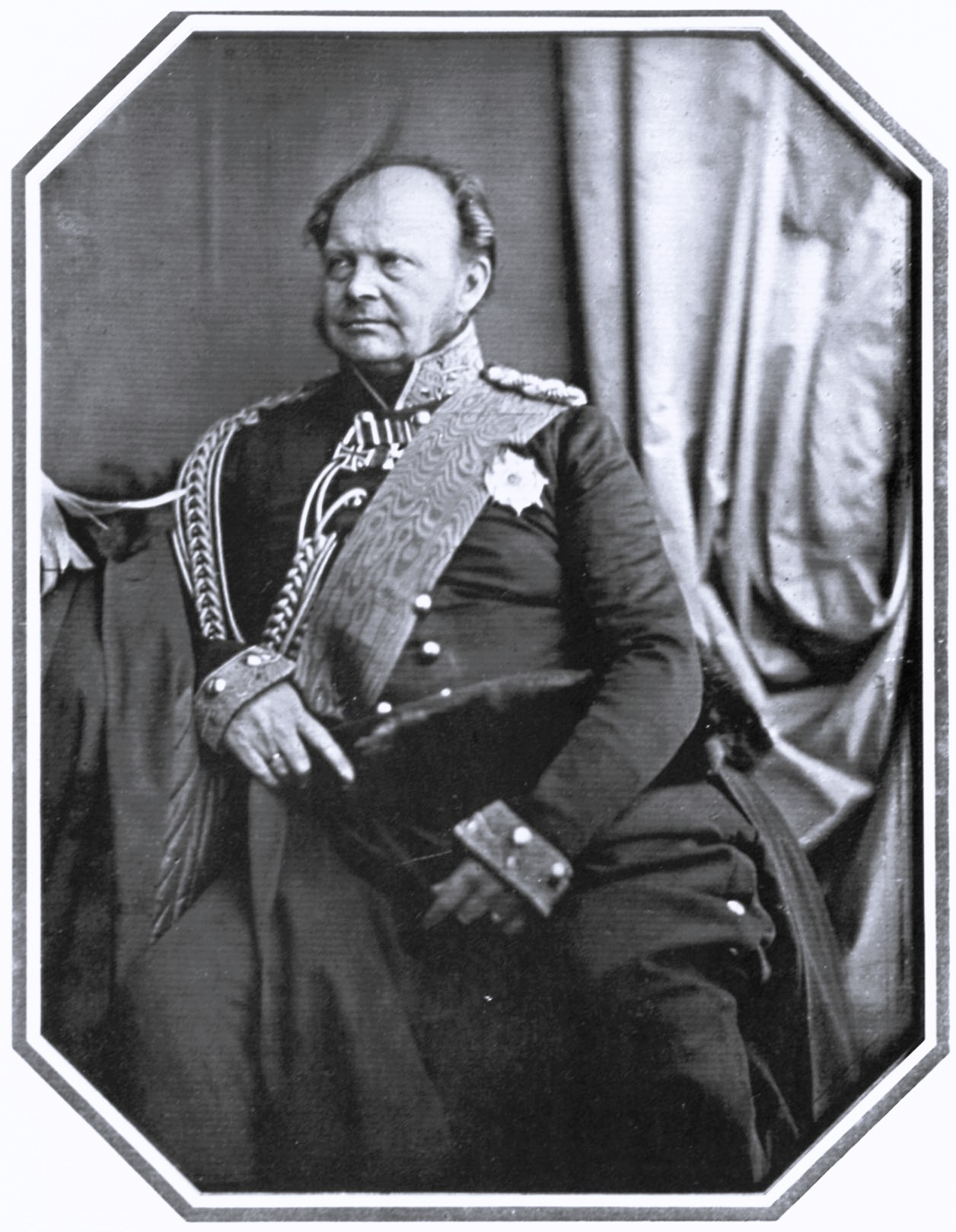
Frederick William IV

The missing funds were successfully borrowed from the Royal Maritime Trading Institute. On 9th October 1841, the new Prussian king, Frederick William IV, permitted the formation of the company and the commencement of preliminary work, while the founding meeting took place on 16 and 17 March 1842; at this meeting, the statutes were adopted and the governing bodies of the Wrocław–Świdnica–Świebodzice Railway Company (German: Breslau–Schweidnitz–Freiburger Eisenbahngesellschaft, abbreviated BSFE) were elected. Ruffer became an appointed director of the company, and the shareholders included among others, the owner of Książ, Count Hans Henrich XI von Hochberg, as well as local aristocracy, merchants, and magnates.

=== Plans and construction of the Wrocław – Świebodzice line ===
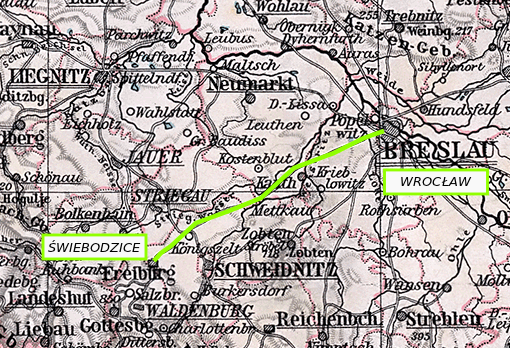
Wrocław–Świebodzice line route

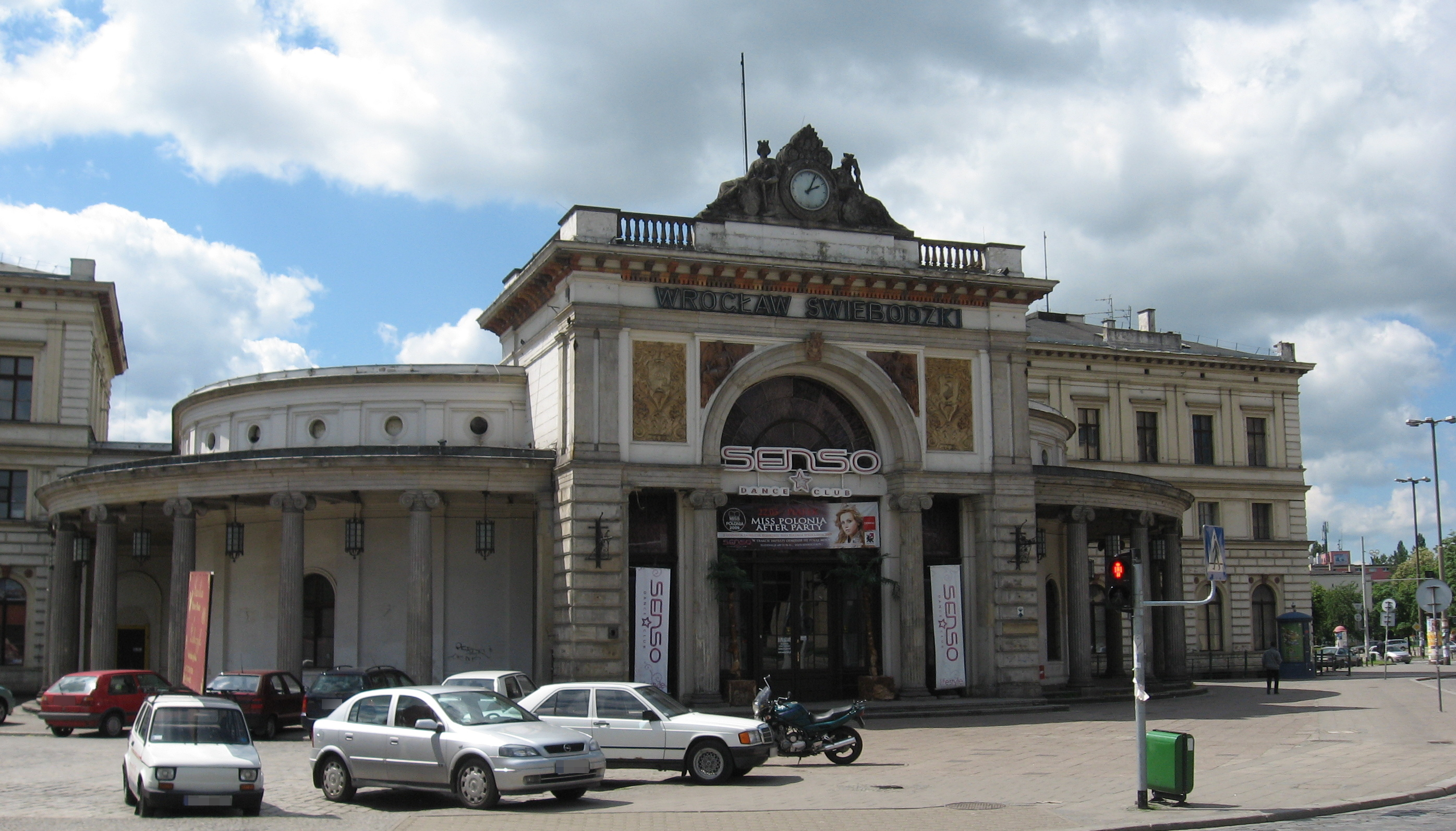
Wrocław Świebodzki railway station

Initially, consideration was given to a proposal by one of the Company’s major shareholders, the industrialist Kramsta from Świebodzice, who was regarded at the time as the wealthiest man in Lower Silesia. Kramsta advocated for a railway line running from Świebodzice to Środa Śląska, as a branch of the planned route from Wrocław to Berlin, a railway line ultimately constructed between 1844 and 1847 by the Lower Silesian-Marcher Railway. After this option was rejected, the route similar to the current railway line passing through Kąty Wrocławskie and Imbramowice was accepted. The technical preparatory work was carried out by Engineer-Officer von Köckritz and Chief Engineer Zimpel. In 1841, the design was refined by Senior Engineer Aleks Cochius, previously the builder of the Berlin–Anhalt railway, whom the Company had recruited, who laid out the connection in an almost straight line, with terminal stations at both ends.

The coat of arms of Jaworzyna Śląska commemorates the link between the town's founding and the construction of the railway junction

Earthworks for the Wrocław–Świebodzice railway line were carried out in 1842, the track was subsequently laid over the next year and a half, the line was completed in 1843 using materials such as rails imported from England and transported from Szczecin via barges on the Oder River to the Malczyce port. Work proceeded simultaneously along the entire route, employing nearly 2,000 workers. Passenger services on the Wrocław–Świebodzice line began on October 29, 1843, while freight services began on January 1, 1844.

=== Line extension to Wałbrzych Fabryczny ===
The connection to Wałbrzych, planned to maximize investment returns, wasn't realized for 8 years after the line had reached Świebodzice. Obstacles included not only the general financial market crisis, which made raising the capital difficult, but also resistance from the Legnica administrative authorities regarding the granting of a concession for the subsequent section. This opposition was motivated by factors such as the need to protect the interests of the Malczyce port, as well as concerns regarding unemployment among carters and future coal prices. The railway connection was completed between 1851 and 1853, and the Świebodzice–Wałbrzych Fabryczny section was opened on July 15, 1853.

=== Construction of a railway connection to Świdnica and the founding of the town of Jaworzyna Śląska ===
The decision to bypass Świdnica while routing the mainline, and instead connect the city via a spur from the Wrocław–Świebodzice line, likely stemmed from Świdnica’s status as a fortress town (held until 1866) and the resulting difficulties in negotiating with the military. Another reason suggested in the literature is the significant capital investment by a group of merchants from Świebodzice, who sought the most direct connection possible to Wrocław. Ultimately, the line to Świdnica was designed as a spur branching off southward at a right angle from the main line, outside the existing settlement network, near Stary Jaworów. The project was submitted to the authorities for approval in 1843. A royal decree issued on 1 September 1843, formally designated the site for a new settlement, the modern day town of Jaworzyna Śląska, at the location of the planned railway junction. The settlement was given the distinctive name Königszelt ("Royal Tent") to commemorate the fact that King Frederick the Great had stationed his military camp in nearby Bolesławice during the war of 1761, while awaiting an attack by combined Austrian and Russian forces.

The trains on the 10 km route between Jaworzyna Śląska and Świdnica, connecting with trains running between Świebodzice and Wrocław, were launched on 21 July 1844.

=== Efforts for the construction of the Batlic – Adriatic connection ===
Following the opening of the railway line to Świdnica, the issue of establishing a rail connection with the Austrian railway network remained a priority. The aim was to create the shortest possible link between the Baltic and the Adriatic by extending the line, on one side via Ząbkowice Śląskie and Kłodzko to the border in Międzylesie, and on the other towards Głogów, Zielona Góra, and Szczecin, reaching as far as Świnoujście. At spring 1843, based on a plan from 1841, an attempt was made to secure a concession to build the entire route; however this failed due to a refusal from the state authorities. Despite failing to obtain the concession, the decision was made to proceed with the project at the company's own expense, in small stages. Construction of the Świdnica–Dzierżoniów railway section began in 1852, and the line opened for service on 24 November 1855. A month earlier on 25 October 1855, an extension in the opposite direction from Jaworzyna Śląska to Strzegom was opened; a year later on 16 December 1856, the line was extended from Strzegom to the Lower Silesian-Marcher Railway station in Legnica, providing rail access to the town of Jawor, a connection the local authorities had strongly advocated for.

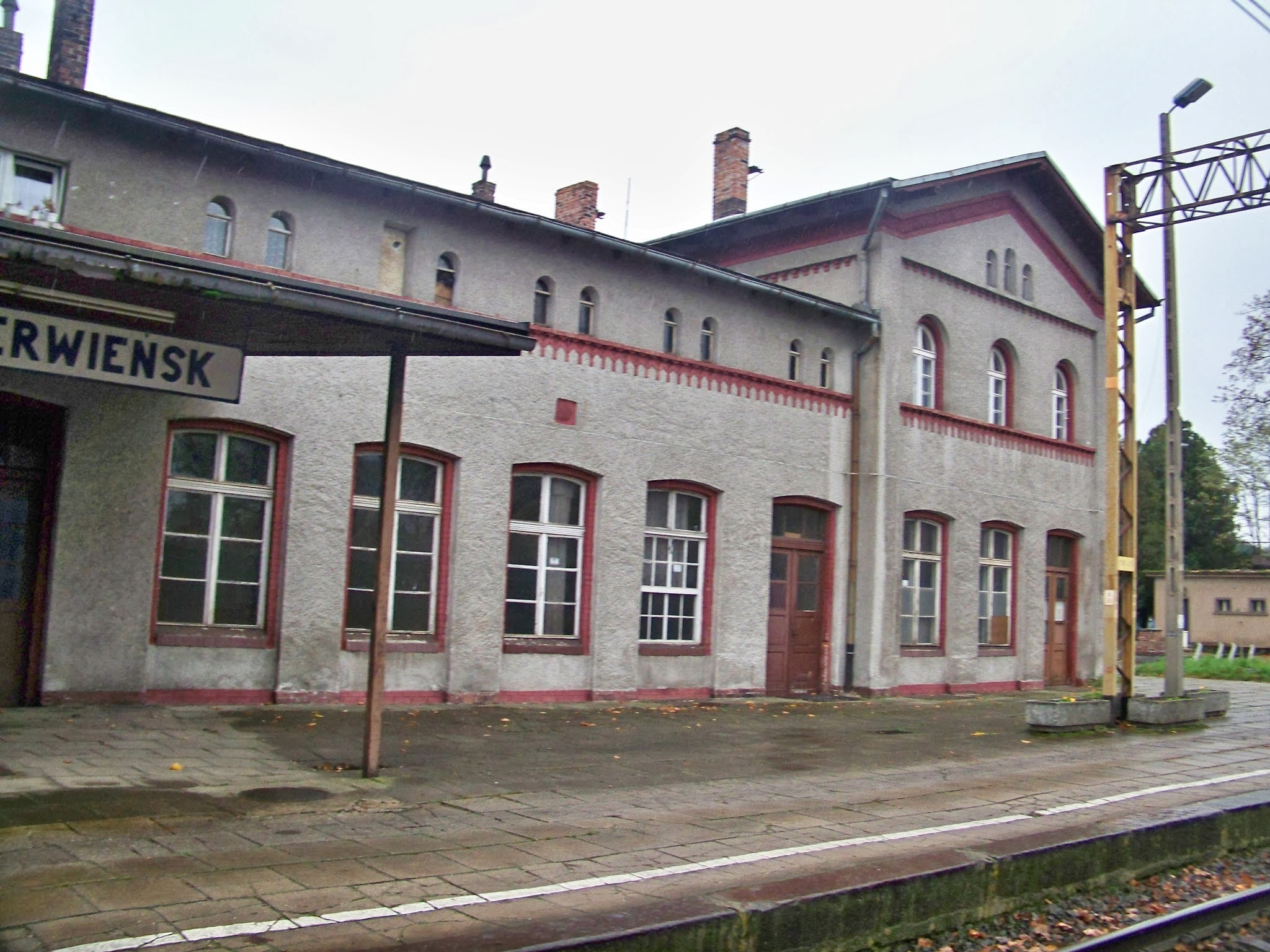
Czerwieńsk railway station (modern day view)

The plans to extend the line north of Legnica, creating a potential competition for transport services towards Berlin, met with firm resistance from the management of the Lower Silesian-Marcher Railway, which was by then state-owned. The new railway line proposed by the Wrocław-Świdnica-Świebodzice Railway was intended to connect with the Marcher-Poznań Railway via the Czerwieńsk junction, this posed a threat to the interests of the state operator, which ran services from Wrocław to Berlin via Legnica and Węgliniec. Construction of the line was authorized only in the late 1860s and early 1870s, by which time the Upper Silesian Railway (also state-controlled) had beaten the BSFE in the race to link Pomerania with Vienna. It had achieved this by operating the line from Międzylesie to Wrocław (built 1871–1875), connected to the older Wrocław–Poznań railway line (built 1856), and by controlling the Poznań-Stargard Railway, whereas the Lower Silesian-Marcher Railway had already built a shorter connection to Żary.

The Wrocław-Świebodzice Railway opened the northward line in sections: to Lubin 25 December 1869, to Głogów on 9 January1871, to Czerwieńsk on 1 October 1871, to Rzepin on 1 May 1874, to Kostrzyn on 2 January 1875, to Chojna on 16 November 1876, and to Szczecin (Wrocław Station) on 15 May 1877.

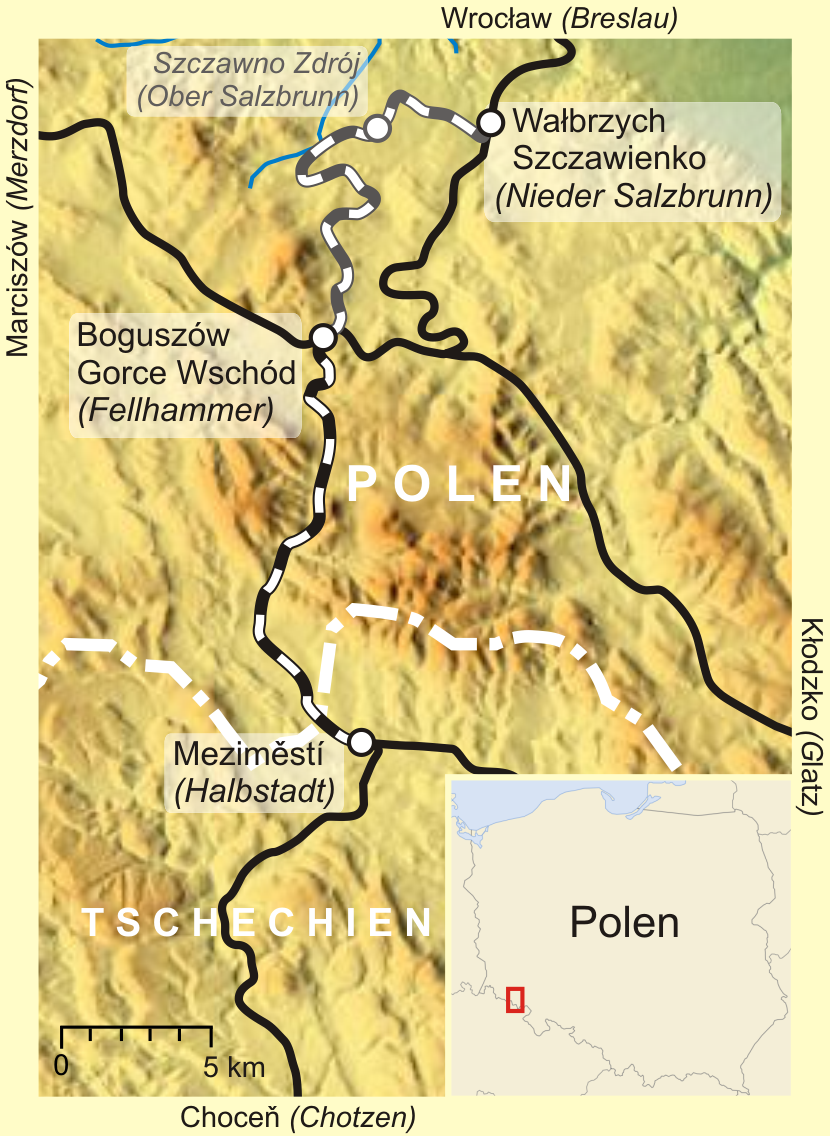
Wałbrzych Szczawienko–Meziměstí route diagram

Original plans to extend the route to Świnoujście were scrapped. Between 1872 and 1874, a 74.4 km shortcut connection was built from Wrocław via Wołów and Brzeg Dolny, connecting to the railway line from Legnica at Rudna; this reduced the need for trains from Wrocław to reach the new line via the longer route through Jaworzyna Śląska. The route which featured two large bridges over the Oder, at Ścinawa and Brzeg Dolny, were opened on 1 August 1874.

Although the Wrocław-Świdnica-Świebodzice Railway lost the race to become the first to secure a connection with the Austrian railway network, a link that promised to capture trade between the Adriatic and Baltic Seas, plans for such a connection weren't abandoned, even though the route ultimately chosen differed from the one originally envisaged. On 15 May 1877, the opening of a line approximately 35 kilometers long running from Wałbrzych Szczawienko station via Szczawno-Zdrój, Kuźnice Świdnickie, and Mieroszów to Meziměstí, established a connection with the Choceń–Broumov line, which had been built two years earlier.

=== Nationalisation of private railways ===
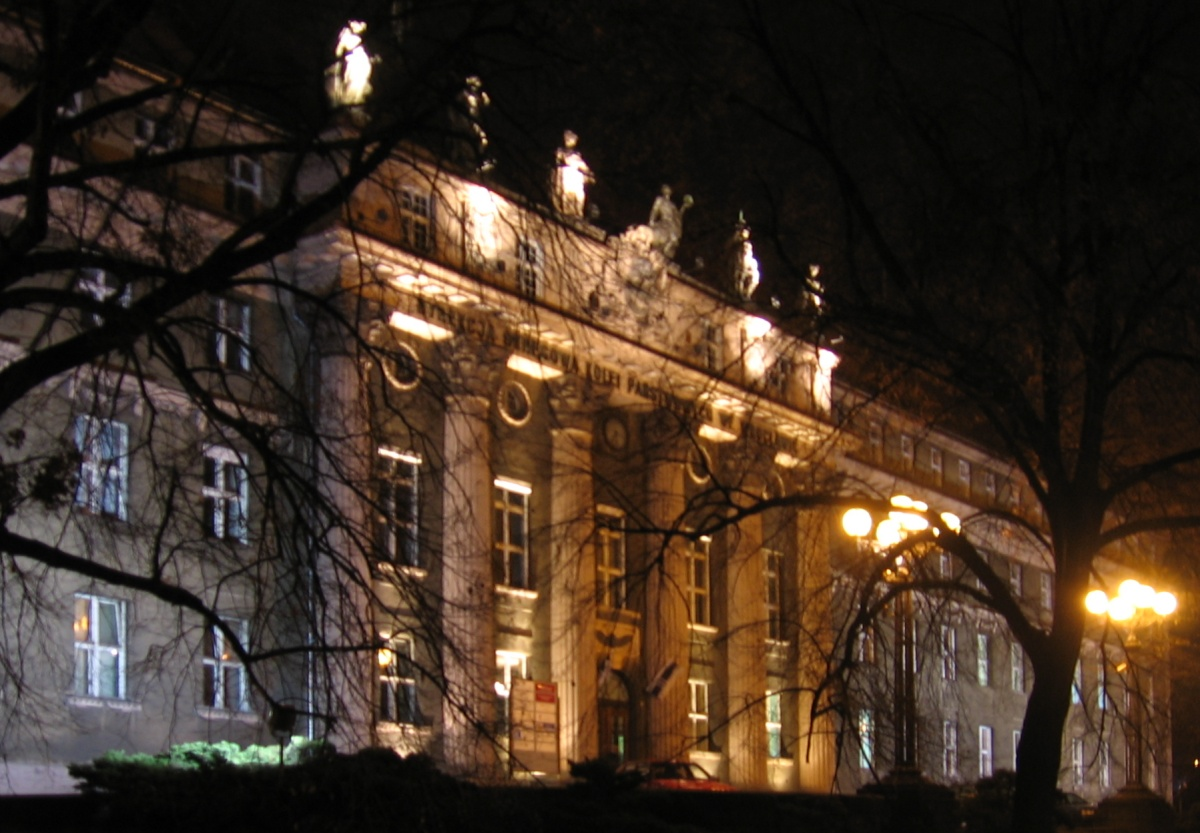
Royal Railway Directorate Building in Wrocław

The railway system in Prussia, under construction since the 1830s, initially developed through the activities of private enterprises, railway companies operating under state concessions. Entrusting railway construction to private entrepreneurs stemmed from the Prussian state treasury's limited resources at the time and an initial alignment of private capital interests with the public interest. By 1876, however with 50 railway company administrations in Prussia managing 63 essentially separate networks and applying nearly 1,400 different transport tariffs, the divergence between state interests and those of the railway companies had widened significantly. Furthermore, the Prussian state had already recognized the military and economic importance of railways through its earlier involvement in specific railway projects. This led to a firm conviction regarding the necessity of nationalizing the majority of railway companies, via compulsory buyout, and consolidating them into a unified entity, a process carried out in subsequent years.

On 1 March 1884, the management of the Wrocław-Świdnica-Świebodzice Railway was taken over by the state pursuant to the Act of 24 January 1884. The company dissolved on 1 July 1886, and its assets were placed under the administration of the Royal Railway Directorate in Wrocław, the institution managing the Prussian State Railways (KPEV) in western Silesia.

== Routes ==
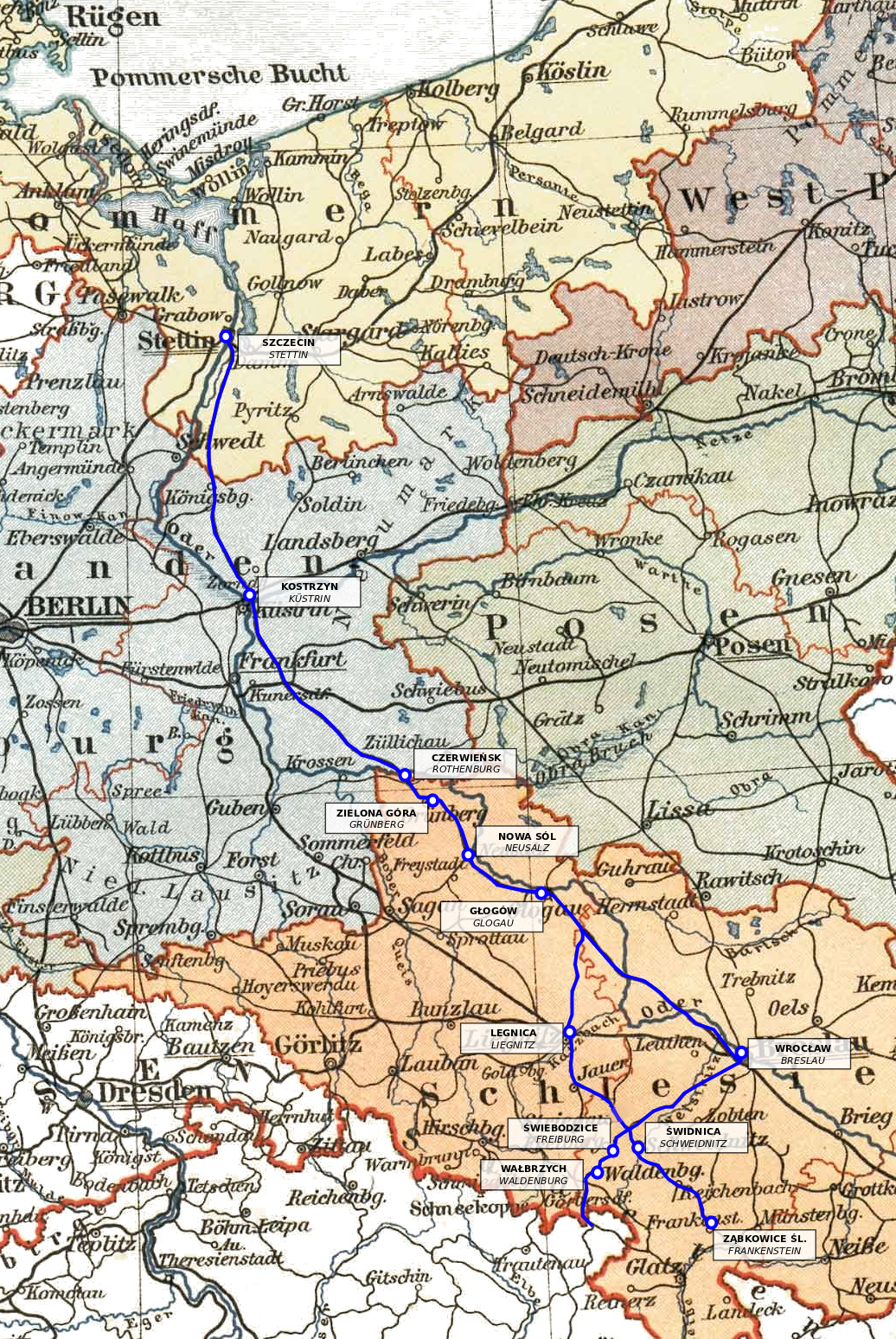
Routes of the Wrocław-Świdnica-Świebodzice Railway in 1886

- Wrocław Świebodzki – Świebodzice (opened on 29 October 1843)
  - Świebodzice – Wałbrzych Fabryczny extension (opened on 1 March 1853)
  - Wałbrzych Szczawienko – Mezimesti extension since 15 May 1877
  - Kuźnice Świdnickie – Boguszów extension since 10 May 1878.
- Jaworzyna Śląska – Świdnica Miasto (opened on 21 July 1844)
  - Świdnica Miasto – Dzierżoniów Śląski extension since 24 November 1855
  - Jaworzyna Śląska – Legnica extension since 16 December 1856
  - Dzierżoniów Śląski – Ząbkowice Śląskie extension since 1 November 1858
- Wrocław Świebodzki / Legnica – Szczecin Podjuchy (full route operational since 15 May 1877)
  - Legnica – Lubin extension, 25 December 1869
  - Lubin – Rudna – Głogów extension, 9 January 1871
  - Głogów – Zielona Góra – Czerwieńsk extension, 1 October 1871
  - Czerwieńsk – Rzepin extension, 1 May 1874
  - Wrocław – Rudna Gwizdanów extension, 1 August 1874
  - Rzepin – Kostrzyń extension, 2 January 1875
  - Kostrzyń – Chojna extension, 16 November 1876
  - Chojna – Szczecin extension, 15 May 1877

== Rolling stock ==
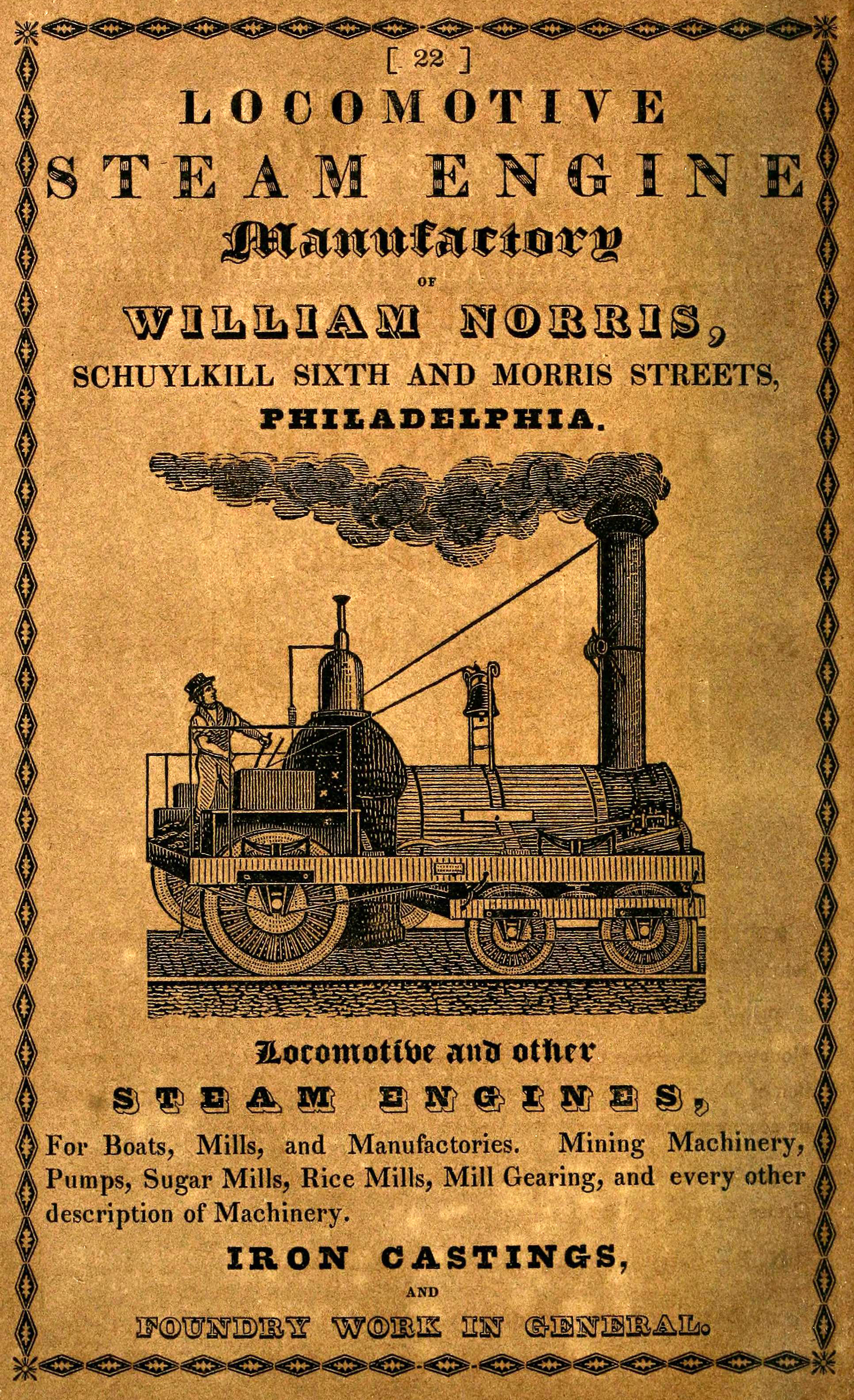
Advertisement for Norris Locomotive Works in Pennsylvania from 1842. The works delivered one of the first steam engines to the Wrocław-Świdnica-Świebodzice Railway, named Liczyrzepa (German: Rübezahl.)

=== Locomotives ===
The first eight steam locomotives were brought to the Wrocław-Świebodzice Railway from outside Prussia. At that time, this was not unusual, as locomotives were mainly brought in from England until German factories mastered the technology of manufacturing them. From a preserved report by the line's chief engineer, Cochius, from 1845, it was known that the locomotives had given names, mostly related to the region and the areas through which the railway line ran.

The first six locomotives came from Sharp, Roberts and Company in Manchester. They were machines called:

- Kąty Wrocławskie (German: Kanth)
- Książ (German: Fürstenstein)
- Naprzód (German: Vorwärts)
- Świebodzice (German: Freiburg)
- Świdnica (German: Schweidnitz)
- Wrocław (German: Breslau)

The seventh engine, called Liczyrzepa (German: Rübezahl), came from the Norris Locomotive Works factory in Pennsylvania, United States. Meanwhile, the eighth engine, called Szczęść Boże! (German: Grüß Gott!), was built at the Robert Stephenson & Company factory in Newcastle upon Tyne, owned by Robert Stephenson, the son of the creator of the modern railway, George Stephenson.

=== Wagon fleet ===
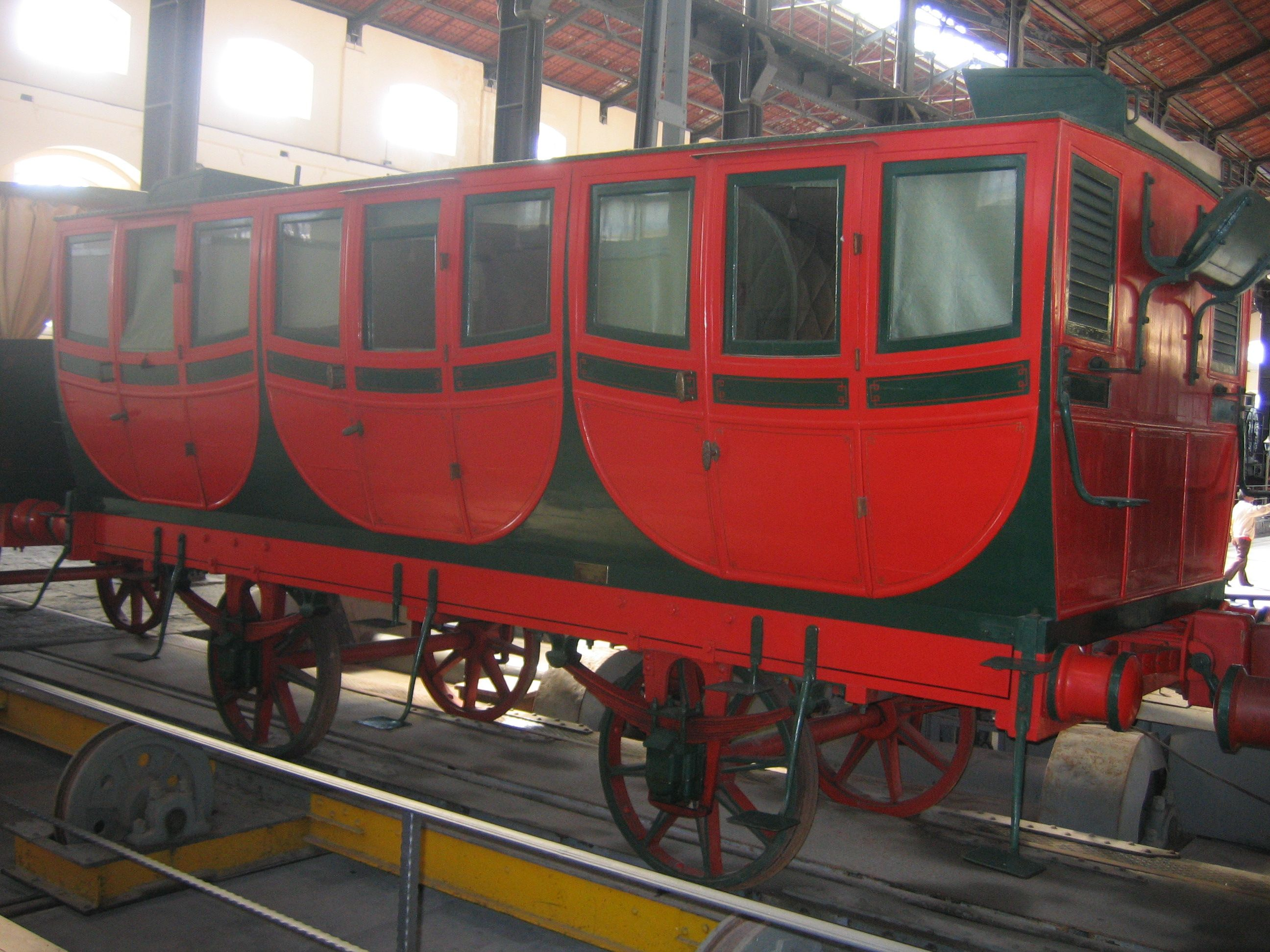
Reconstructed first class carriage of the first Italian train. According to historical descriptions, similar first class carriages ran on trains of the Wrocław-Świdnica-Świebodzice Railway.

Much simpler in construction than locomotives, the carriages were already being produced in Prussia from 1838. The first passenger carriages, ordered from the Berlin works Fabrik für Eisenbahnbedarf Pflug & Zoller, were built to resemble horse-drawn stagecoaches. They were up to 2.5 meters wide and no more than 2 meters high. At first, only two axles were used, spaced 2 to 3.5 meters apart.

There were three classes in the carriages of the Wrocław-Świdnica-Świebodzice Railway:

- First – three compartments, windows glazed,
- Second – four compartments, curtains in the windows used in case of rain or wind,
- Third – five compartments, open wagons (without a roof) with lattice walls

Passengers boarded the compartments from the side of the carriages – these were called compartment coaches. At first, after dark, the carriages weren’t lit. Oil lamps and candles were introduced in 1845. Containers of hot water were used to heat the carriages. Toilets in the carriages were introduced in 1860.

Freight cars, manufactured in the Wrocław factory of Georg Linke and Finkerney (later part of Linke-Hoffman Werke), were wooden, sometimes reinforced with zinc plating.

Overall, at the beginning of operations, 81 carriages were bought.

=== Train consist ===
A typical BSFE train, as seen in old illustrations, consisted of a steam engine, a coal or wood car (a tender), and between eight to ten passenger cars of various classes. There were sometimes cars with combined classes. Occasionally, a special platform was added to the train, allowing a passenger to travel along with their carriage.

The first trains reached speeds of around 30–40 km/h (19–25 mph). Faster speeds were reached during the day, while slower speeds occurred after dark.

== See also ==
- Wrocław Świebodzki railway station
