= Kłodzko Nowe–Kudowa-Zdrój railway =

Railway line in Lower Silesia, south-west Poland

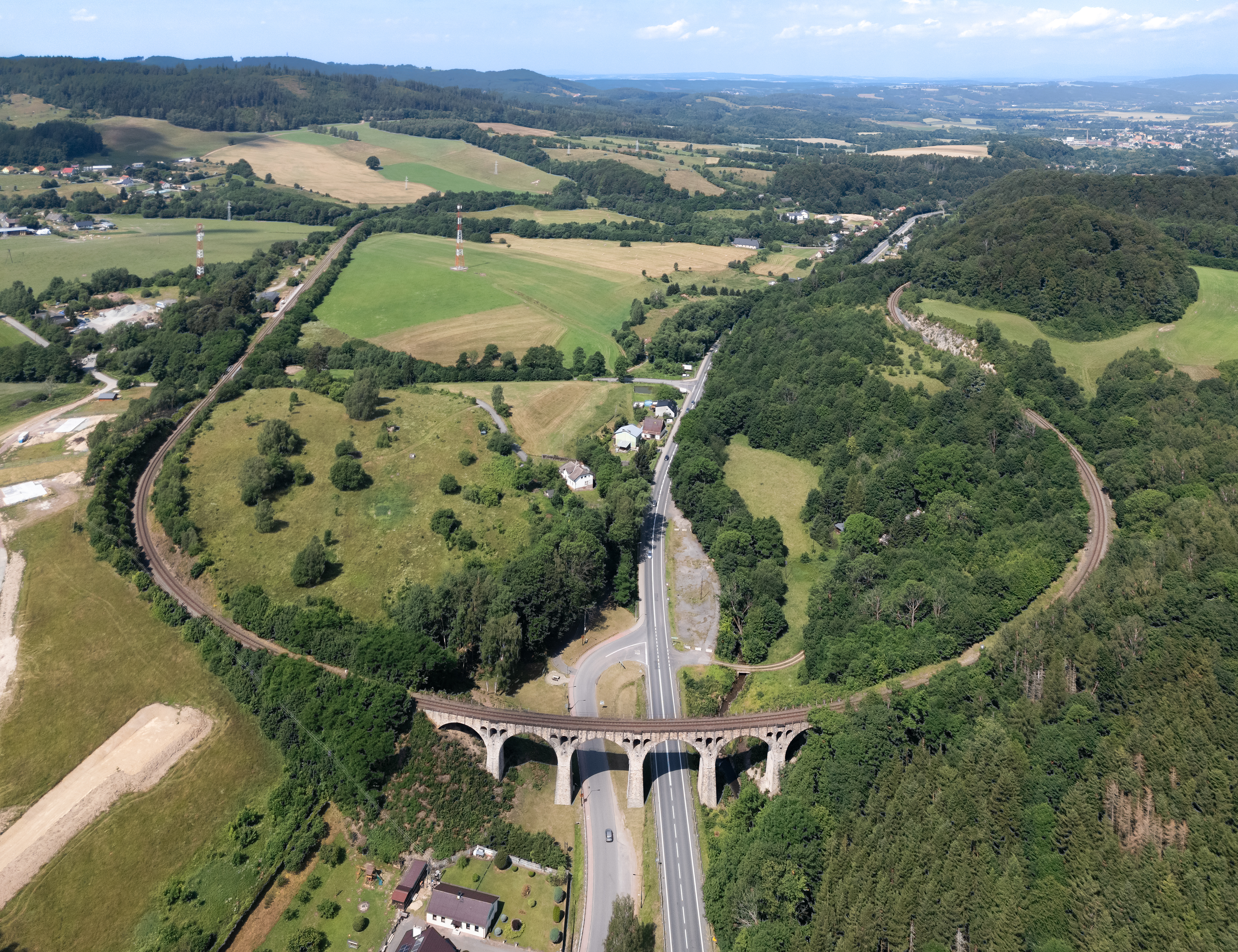
- Lewin Kłodzki railway viaduct

Overview
- Status: Operational
- Owner: PKP Polskie Linie Kolejowe
- Line number: PKP 309
- Locale: Lower Silesian Voivodeship, Poland
- Termini: Kłodzko Nowe; Kudowa-Zdrój

Service
- Operators: PKP Intercity; Lower Silesian Railways

History
- Opened: 1890, 1902, 1905

Technical
- Line length: 40.126 km (24.933 mi)
- Number of tracks: 1
- Track gauge: 1,435 mm (4 ft 8 1/2 in) standard gauge
- Operating speed: 30–120 km/h (19–75 mph)

The Kłodzko Nowe–Kudowa-Zdrój railway is an unelectrified, single-track, railway connecting Kłodzko Nowe railway junction near Kłodzko Miasto railway station in Kłodzko and Kudowa-Zdrój railway station in Kudowa-Zdrój, in the Lower Silesian Voivodeship in south-western Poland.

Located in the Sudeten Foreland, the line starts at Kłodzko Nowe railway junction, around 4.9 km (3.0 mi) south of Kłodzko Miasto, which is from were the line can be accessed by incoming trains, branching off the Wrocław–Międzylesie railway. Regional passenger services have been operated by Lower Silesian Railways after the line's reconstruction and extensive modernisation in 2013.

The current extent of the line opened in three stages across a period of 15 years (1890–1905). It is famous for the Lewin Kłodzki railway viaduct, built in 1903–1905 during the extension from Duszniki-Zdrój to Kudowa-Zdrój. In 1945, the line briefly ran to Náchod when it was extended by prisoners of war of Nazi Germany during the final stages of World War II; it was dismantled in 1947 or 1948. The short single-station section to Słone Kłodzkie was closed in 1955–1960.

== History ==
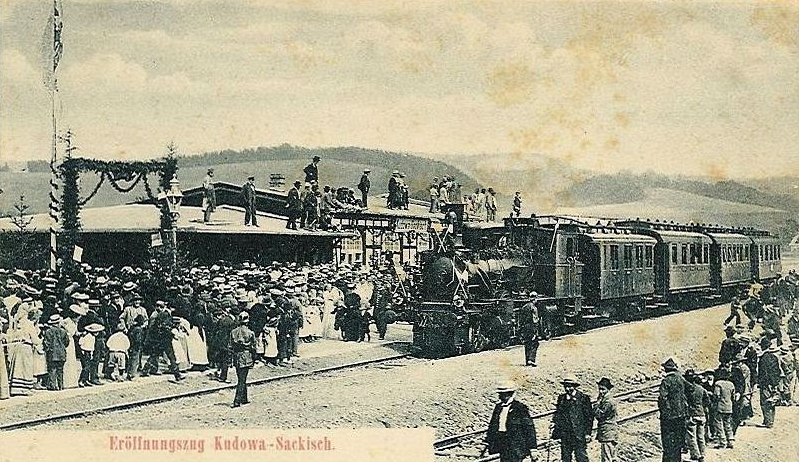
Ceremonial train at Kudowa-Zdrój in July 1905

Construction of the first section of the line from Kłodzko Nowe to Szczytna began in 1886. It was opened by Prussian State Railways on 15 December 1890, with the extension to Duszniki-Zdrój opening in December 1902 – the construction took a long time due to the Sudeten Foreland's complex terrain. The extension to Kudowa-Zdrój, opened on 10 July 1905, which featured numerous bridges, tunnels, and viaducts, most notably the Lewin Kłodzki railway viaduct, marking the line's current extent. On 15 May 1906, the line was extended by one station to Słone Kłodzkie, where it was eventually intended to connect with the railway network in Náchod, which was part of Austria-Hungary.

=== Kudowa-Zdrój–Náchod ===
Traffic on the line was heavy, however most trains terminated at Kudowa-Zdrój, with only a few continuing to Słone Kłodzkie, given that in the 1935 timetable, only one pair of trains ran the whole route. The idea of connecting Kudowa-Zdrój with Náchod by rail came as early as 1866 which was committed by Austria-Hungary. Which never came to approval; it was only until 25 May 1880 when a detailed plan for the route was adopted. Initially, the Kingdom of Prussia was willing to fund the construction, however the Austrians remained indifferent to the proposal. The situation changed at the end of the 19th century, when a consortium of German industrialists applied for a concession to build and operate the Kudowa-Zdrój–Náchod route. This attempt also failed. A document regarding the planned route was issued on 16 June 1900, however the signing of international agreements (as it would have been a cross-border railway) and the line having to meet the standards of a main line, despite being intended for local use, only led to a significant increase in costs, discouraging all parties interested in building the line.

The concept of the Kudowa-Zdrój–Náchod line resurfaced in 1940, when a commission comprising the German military and railway specialists arrived at the border to assess the feasibility of its construction. However, no actual progress was made. It was only until 1945 when the Siege of Breslau started, and the allies began approaching Kudowa compelled the Germans for the immediate and speedy construction of the line. Scheduled for completion on 20 April 1945, it was intended to facilitate the transport of wounded soldiers and the supply of essential materials to the Wehrmacht in the western front. Work actually began in January, carried out by Nazi prisoners of war. A wooden bridge was built over the river Metuje, in which its load-bearing test was conducted on 20 April. After which, the extension opened, the line was nicknamed "Hitler's Railway", under a line speed of 30 km/h (20 mph). It was dismantled after World War II, in 1947 or 1948.

=== Post World War II ===
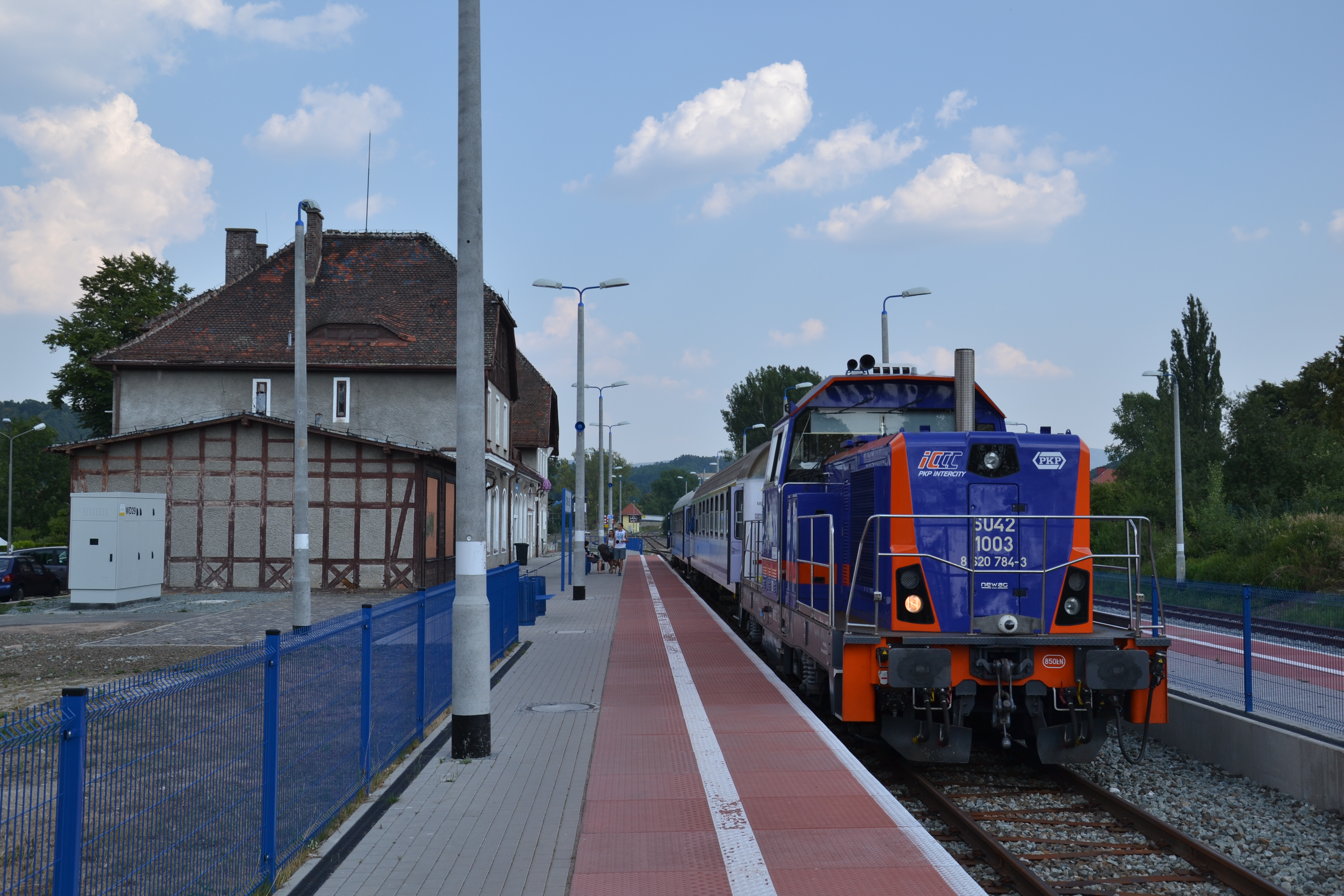
PKP Intercity PKP Class SU42 locomotive at Kudowa Zdrój in August 2015

After World War II, the area came under Polish administration. As a result, the line was taken over by Polish State Railways (PKP). Initially, in 1948, services operated on the whole line, but also ran as far as Warsaw and Gdynia via Wrocław, and Lublin via Kraków and Katowice. The single-station section to Słone Kłodzkie just west of Kudowa closed in 1955–1960; it was dismantled in 1990. After 2000, many of these passenger connections were reduced or withdrawn due to the detoriating condition of the line. On 1 April 2006, coinciding with the closure of the line from Kłodzko Miasto to Wałbrzych Główny, passenger services between Kłodzko Miasto and Kudowa-Zdrój were suspended. Following a protest campaign by local government officials from Kłodzko County and its constituent gminas—which included numerous formal appeals and a picket outside the Marshal's Office in the Lower Silesian Voivodeship—services were resumed in early June 2006.

By August 2007, the line speed was reduced to 25 km/h (15 mph). While drafting the regulations for granting rail operators access to routes for the 2008/2009 timetable, PKP Polskie Linie Kolejowe (PLK) set the planned speed for the Kłodzko Nowe–Kudowa-Zdrój railway at 0 km/h (0 mph), a line speed that would have made it impossible for rail operators to operate trains on the route. These plans sparked a protest from the voivodeship and the Lower Silesian Tourism Organisation (DOT). Their objection was supported by DOT statistics showing that over 21,000 people annually—nearly 10% of all tourists visiting the health resorts of Kłodzko County (Polanica-Zdrój, Duszniki-Zdrój, and Kudowa-Zdrój)—travelled to their destinations by rail. During a visit to Warsaw, the Marshal of the Lower Silesian Voivodeship promised that funding for the renovation of both lines would be secured within the Regional Operational Programme for the Lower Silesian Voivodeship for 2007–2013. At the same time, PLK said that services on the line would not be withdrawn. In 20 October–3 November 2008, urgent repair work was carried out on the line, during which rail replacement bus services operated the route. Trains returned to the line following the completion of track work.

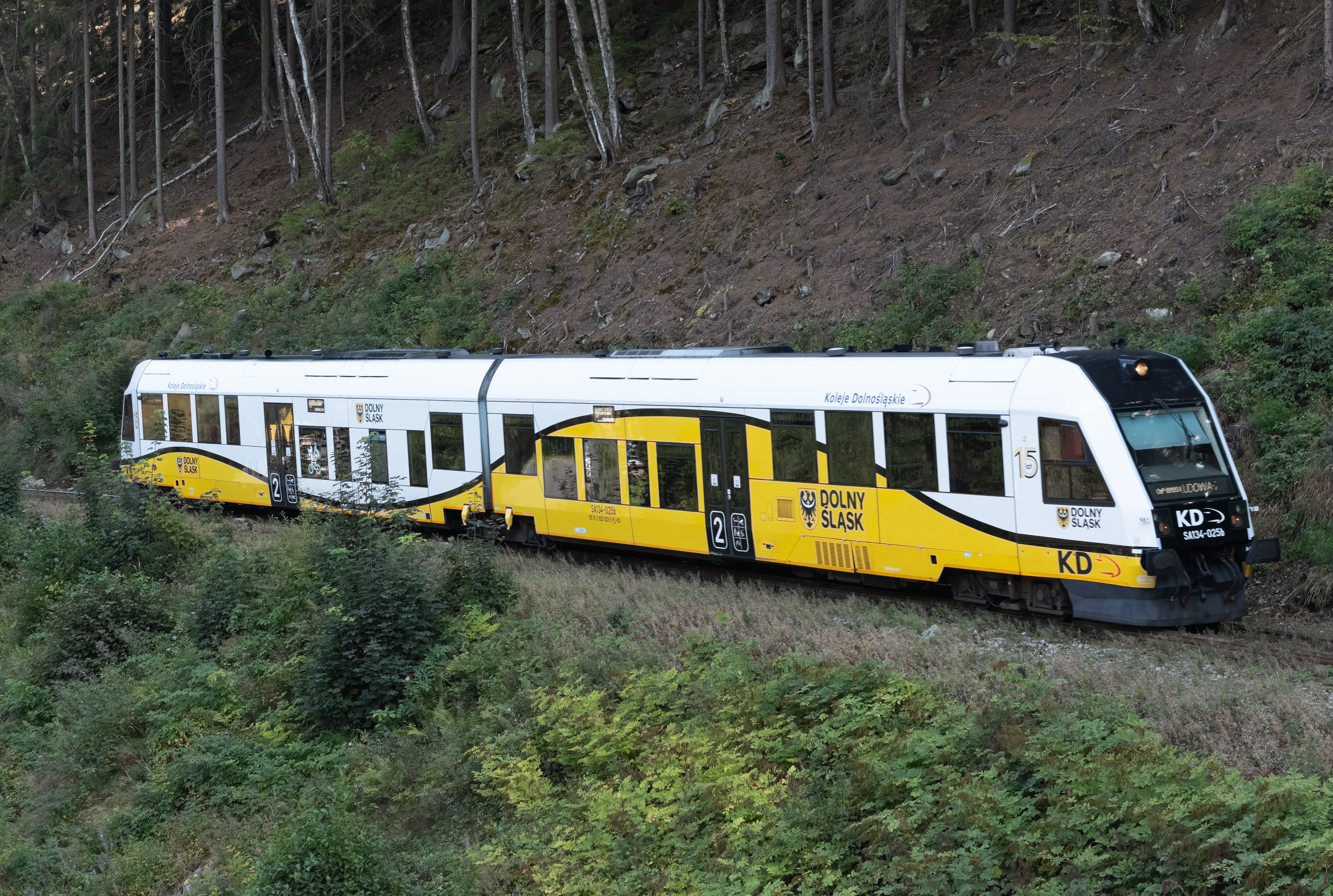
Lower Silesian Railways SA134 near Polanica-Zdrój in August 2024

In preparation for the extensive modernisation of the line, the line closed on 15 March 2010. During this time, services were also substituted by rail replacement bus services. In late 2012, PLK began modernisation work, which included the track reconstruction of the Duszniki–Kudowa Zdrój section, and the modernisation of stations on the line with the construction of new high-level platforms. Passenger services first resumed on the Kłodzko Nowe–Polanica-Zdrój section on 9 June 2013, followed by the opening of the rest of the line on 15 December 2013. The reopening on 9 June saw Lower Silesian Railways operate passenger services on the line for the first time.

In September 2024–31 January 2025, the line was temporarily closed after the 2024 Central European floods destroyed 500 m (1,600 ft) of track between Kłodzko Nowe and Kłodzko Zagórze, which had to be urgently repaired. At the same time, the entire line underwent extensive modernisation work. The work included track sleeper replacement, renovating bridges and viaducts, installation of new drainage, and installation of anti-erosion netting to protect the railway network against rockfalls. This enabled for line speeds in select sections in the Kłodzko area to be increased from 60–80 km/h (35–50 mph) to 120 km/h (75 mph). The work came at a total cost of approximately 105 million PLN. The Polanica-Zdrój–Kudowa-Zdrój section closed for modernisation work on 16 March 2026. It is planned to reopen in October after work is completed.

== Line ==
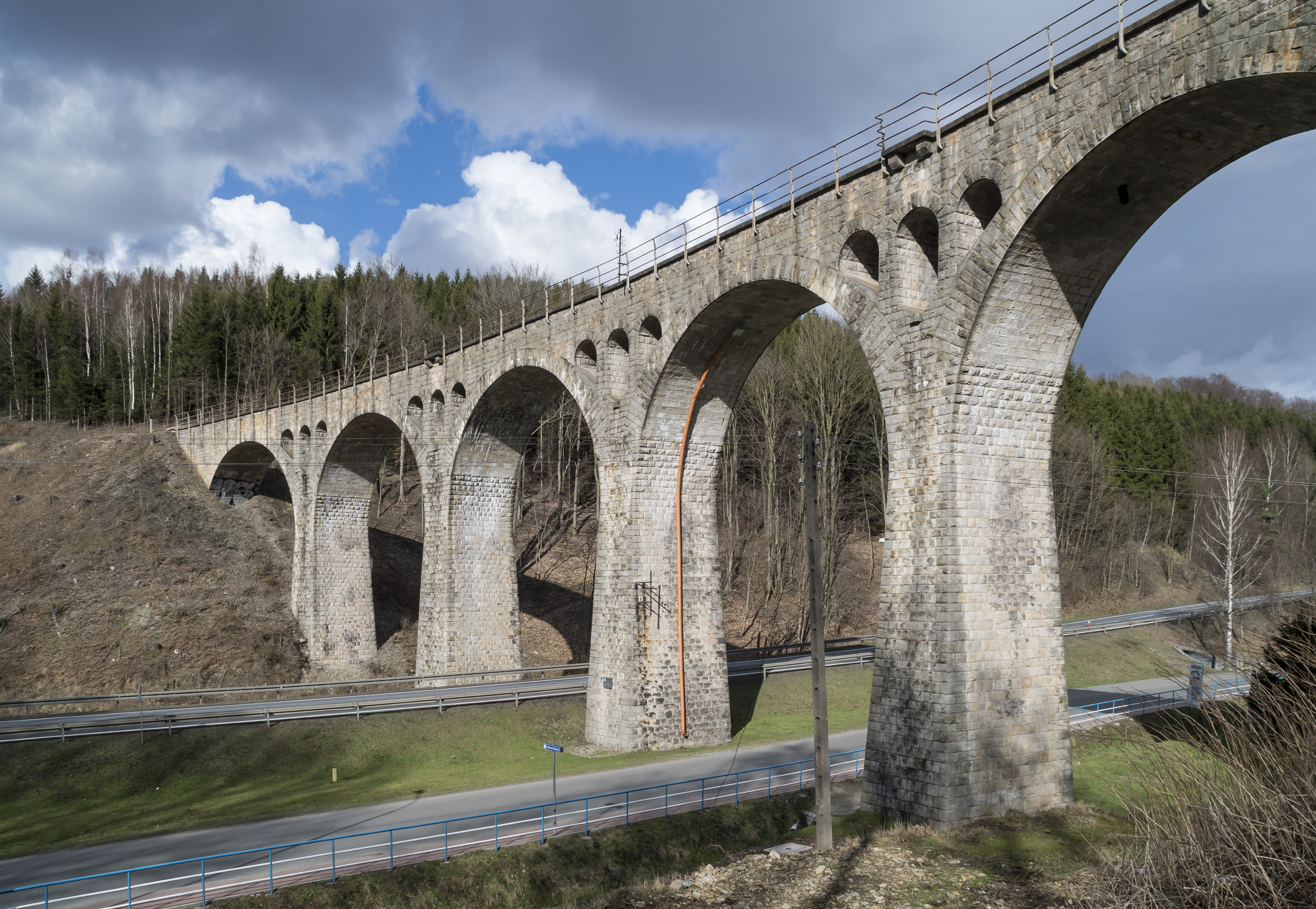
Lewin Kłodzki railway viaduct

The entire Kłodzko Nowe–Kudowa-Zdrój railway is single-track and unelectrified. Eight railway stations are situated on the line. An additional two once operated, and are now disused: Kulin Kłodzki (1905–2026), and Słone Kłodzkie (1906–1948). Regional passenger services are typically operated by railbuses, such as SA135.

=== Lewin Kłodzki railway viaduct ===
Built in 1903–1905, the Lewin Kłodzki railway viaduct is a stone railway viaduct spanning over the Klikawa river and national road 8. It is 120 m (390 ft) long and 27 m (89 ft) tall. The structure has been featured in Euro Truck Simulator 2 and numerous Polish flims.

== Train services ==
Passenger services are operated by Lower Silesian Railways (KD), alongside long-distance services by PKP Intercity. KD operates the following routes: D90 Wrocław Główny – Wałbrzych Główny – Kłodzko Miasto – Kudowa-Zdrój, and D96 Wałbrzych Główny – Kłodzko Miasto – Kudowa-Zdrój.

PKP Intercity operates the weekend running "Śnieżka" service between Wrocław Główny and Kudowa-Zdrój. Part of the December 2026 timetable, the route will be withdrawn.

== See also ==
- Kłodzko Miasto railway station
- Jelenia Góra–Jakuszyce railway
