= 2024 Central European floods =

Floods caused by Storm Boris

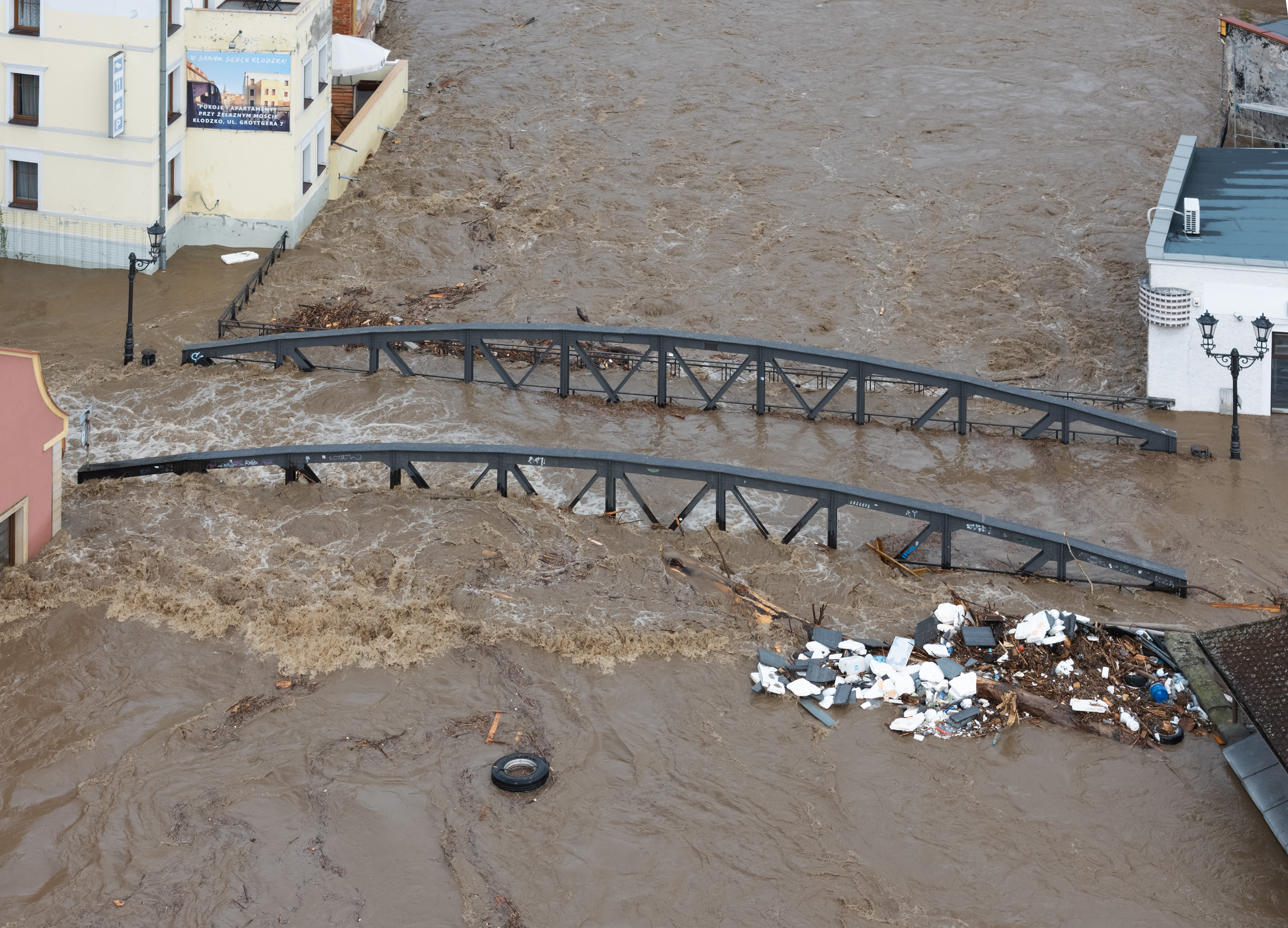
- Flooded Iron Bridge in the town of Kłodzko, Poland on 15 September 2024

Meteorological history
- Duration: 14–21 September 2024 (7 days)

Overall effects
- Fatalities: 27 (Note: 9 in Poland, 7 in Romania, 5 in Austria, 5 in the Czech Republic, 1 in Slovakia)
- Missing: 9 (Note: 8 in the Czech Republic, 1 in Poland)
- Damage: >€2 billion
- Areas affected: Austria, Czech Republic, Germany, Hungary, Poland, Moldova, Romania, Slovakia

The 2024 Central European floods were a series of floods caused by a record heavy rainfall generated by Storm Boris, an extremely humid Genoa low. The flooding began in Austria and the Czech Republic, then spread to Poland, Romania and Slovakia, and then onwards to Germany and Hungary. The floods caused 28 fatalities, and Munich Re estimates the total damage to have been approximately 4.2 billion euros ($4.3 billion), of which approximately 1.9 billion euros ($2.1 billion) were insured.

A 2026 study of Storm Boris found that human-caused climate change intensified the flooding more than the associated rainfall. The researchers estimated that without human-caused warming, precipitation would have been approximately 6-9% lower, while peak flood magnitudes would have been 14-22% lower.

== By country ==
=== Austria ===
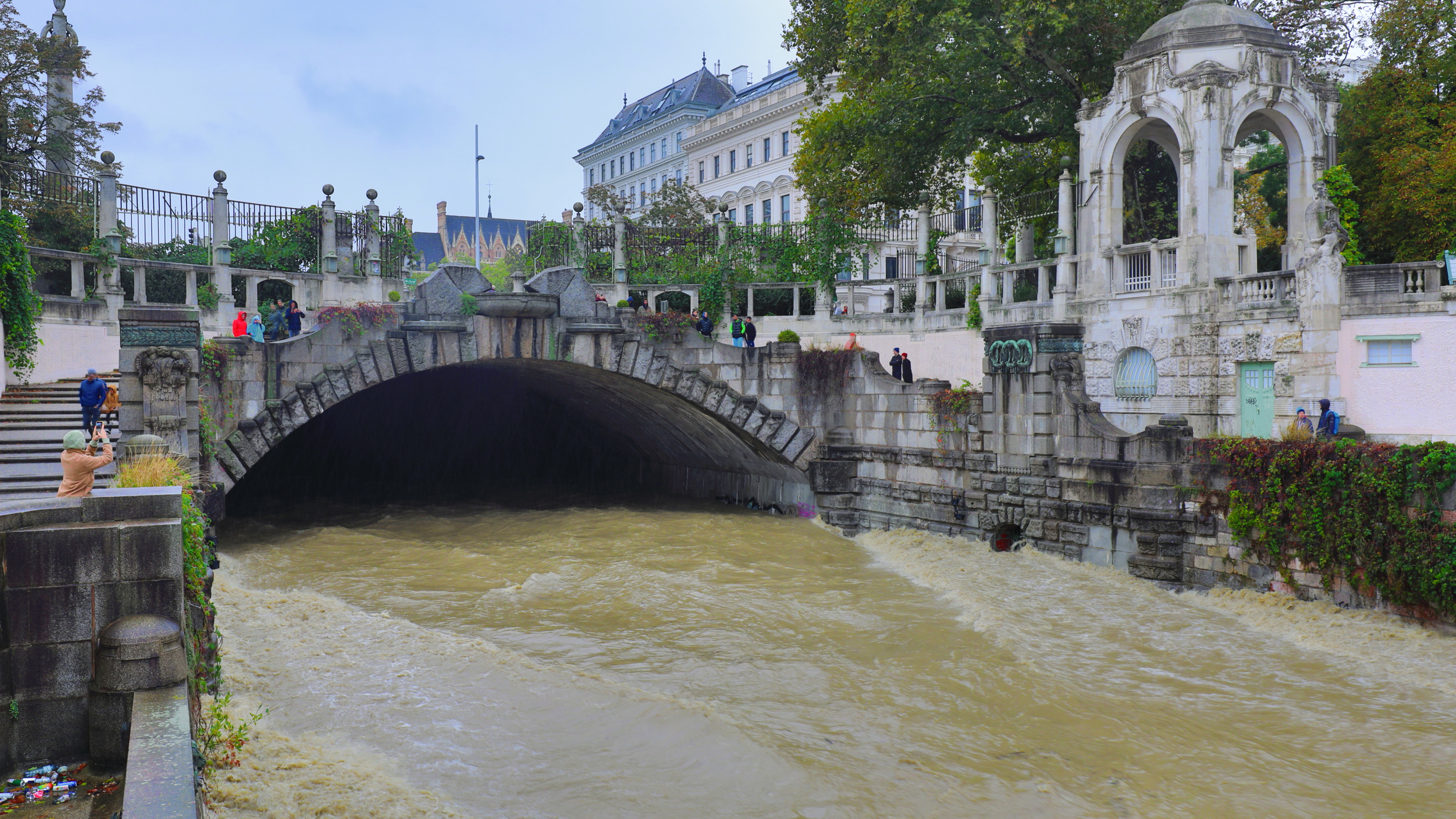
Flooded Vienna River

In Austria, the state of Lower Austria was affected the most, especially the central and northwestern regions, with the rivers Danube, Kamp and Traisen being the most problematic. Beforehand, most worries were focused on Ottenstein reservoir (which had to be hastily drained during the 2002 floods having added much to the damage). Houses along these rivers had to be evacuated, among them the entire villages of Rust im Tullnerfeld and Hardegg. In Vienna, the Danube could be kept under control, but the Wien partly overflowed and areas in Penzing had to be evacuated. Service on the Vienna U-Bahn was reduced drastically. Burgenland, already struck by flooding in June, was under flood warning and suffered damages from storm winds and rain. A dam failure in Sankt Pölten flooded the city, leaving 1.500 people without functioning sewers. Five people, including one firefighter on duty, died in Lower Austria.

In the Alpine regions, the heavy rains turned into snowfall, causing an extremely early onset of winter conditions. Further problems with the melting snow are expected. One person was buried by an avalanche on 13 September at Karwendel and remains missing. Rescue operations were hampered by severe weather. A secondary avalanche injured a rescuer. On 15 September, a skier was found dead under a snowdrift in Untertauern.

=== Czechia ===
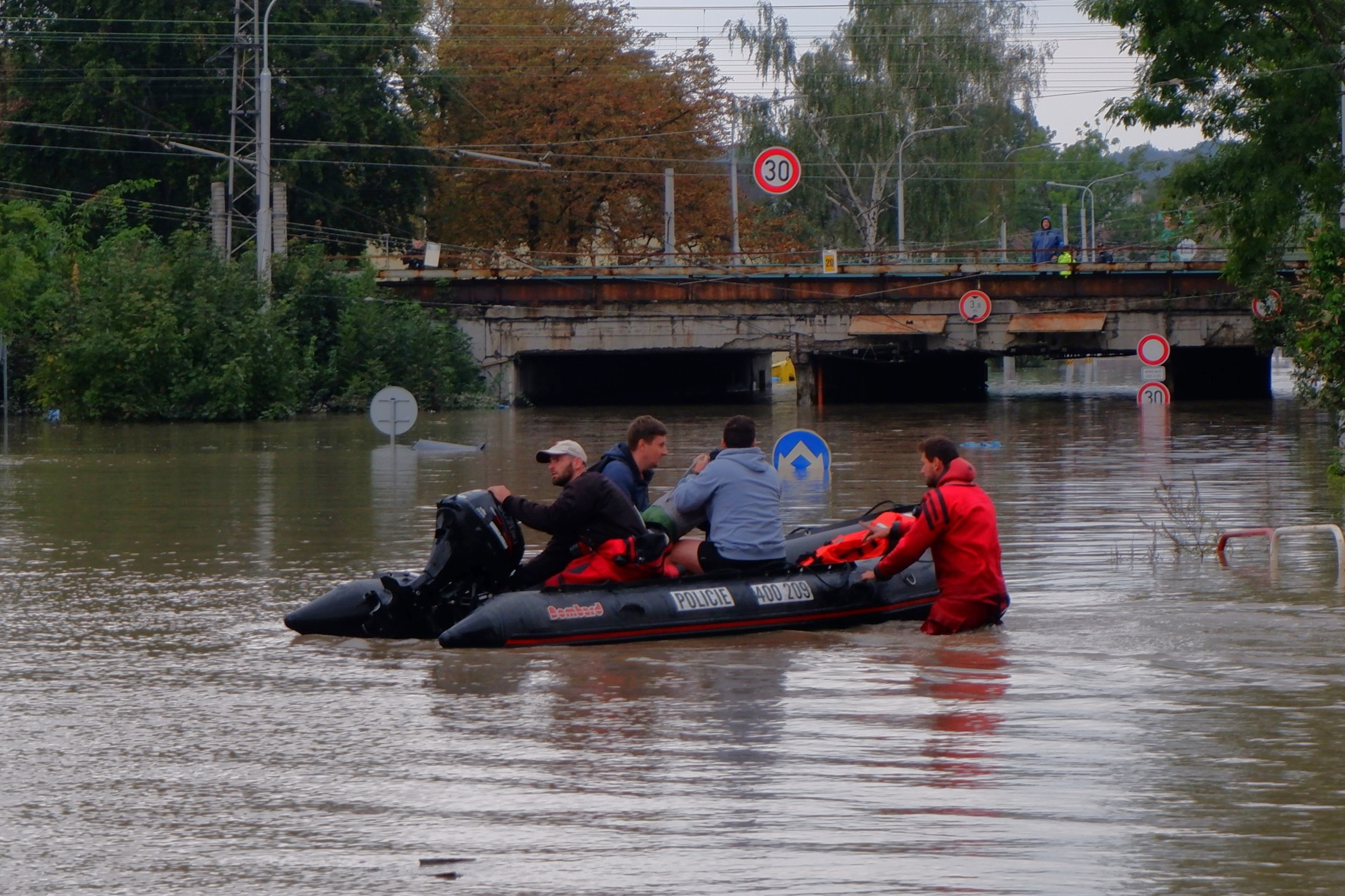
Rescue boat in Ostrava, Czech Republic

Floods in Czechia began on 13 September after heavy rain. As of 15 September, over 200 rivers were reported to have spilled over their banks. The most critical situation was in Silesia and Northern Moravia, especially in the region of the Jeseníky mountains, followed by Northeast Moravia where thousands of people had to be evacuated. Jeseník and Opava were among the worst hit places where a few houses were destroyed by the overflown river. The evacuation operation there started already on the night of 14 and 15 September in the major residential area of Kateřinky. The biggest city hit by the floods was Ostrava. Four people were reported missing nationwide, thousands were displaced and around 250 thousand left without electricity. Several roads and railroads were closed and water entered a station of the Prague Metro causing it to close, but the rest of the network remained operational. Jeseník received nearly 500 mm (20 in) of rain. Parts of Moravia and Silesia exceeded 1997 flood rainfall totals.

On 15 September, Martin Kupka, the Czech transport minister, announced that railway operations in the Moravian-Silesian Region would remain suspended for at least a week to eliminate the damage caused by heavy rain and following floods.

On 15 and 16 September, four people died in the Moravian-Silesian Region. The first person died on 15 September in the Krasovka Stream. On 16 September, two people in Krnov and one in a flooded apartment were found dead. A woman also drowned in Kobylá nad Vidnavkou.

The floods led the Interior Ministry to take direct control of organising voting for the 2024 Czech Senate election on 20 to 21 September in five severely affected towns, while in other areas, voting was held in tents, containers, or in open-air venues.

Following its application in December 2024 and meeting the EU's criteria for a major disaster the European Parliament approved a €114 million (about CZK 2.8 billion) aid to help cover damage from the previous year's severe floods.

=== Poland ===
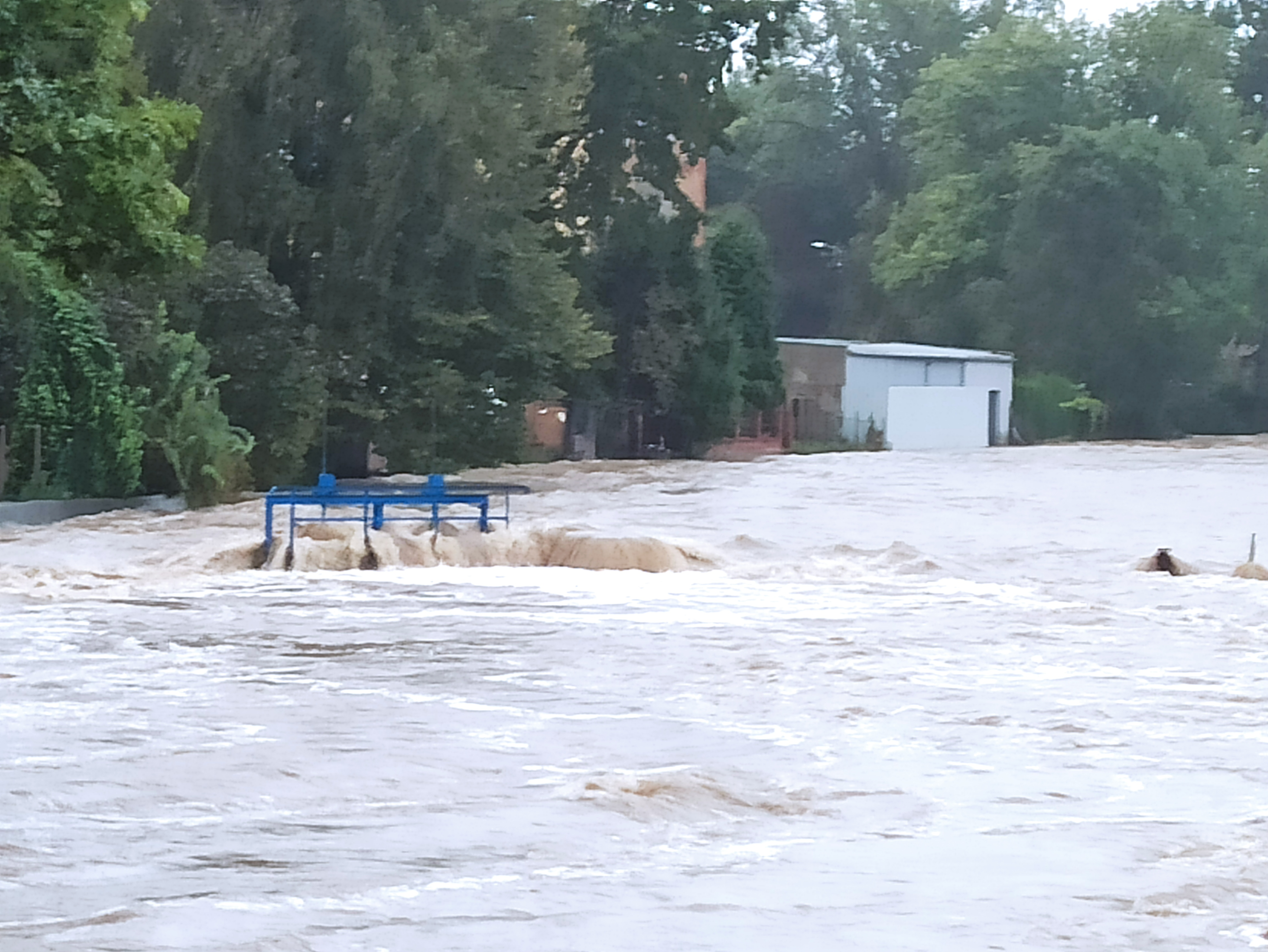
Overflowing river in Prudnik, Poland, 14 September

Boris hovered over southwestern Poland, where it dropped almost half a year worth of rain during three days. Some places saw more than 400 mm (16 in) of torrential rainfall, accompanied by thunderstorms and tornadoes. Boris struck Opole Voivodeship and Lower Silesia, leading to flooding on 14–16 September. Ten people were reported dead as a result of the floods, with thousands displaced and between 50–70 thousand left without electricity. Severe flooding alerts were reached in 82 measuring stations, primarily in the Oder river basin.

On 14 September, in the town of Głuchołazy, water overwhelmed flood barriers and destroyed a temporary bridge on the Bělá river, leading to mandatory evacuations. Schools in Nysa, Kłodzko, Jelenia Góra and Prudnik were closed. Lower Silesian Railways trains running on the Kłodzko Nowe–Kudowa-Zdrój railway were suspended due to multiple cases of track erosion and fallen trees.

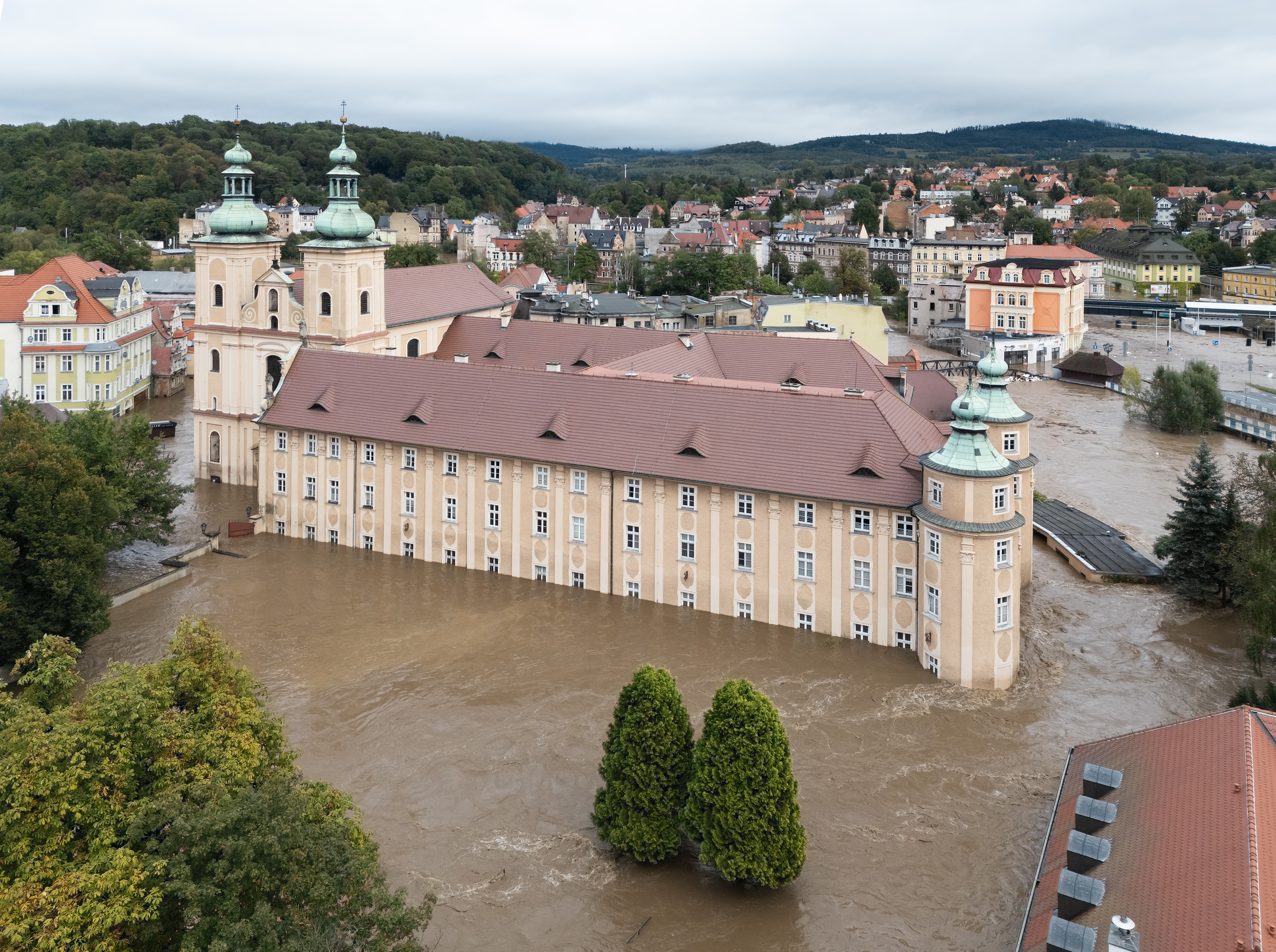
Flooded Franciscan monastery complex in Kłodzko, Poland, 15 September

On 15 September, Prime Minister Donald Tusk declared a state of natural disaster. Up to 2,600 people were evacuated from affected areas on that day alone. Flood barriers failed in Kłodzko and Nysa, leading to flooding up to 150 cm (59 in) in the town centre of Kłodzko, with mayors calling for evacuation. A dam in Międzygórze overflew and was deemed out of control by the Regional Water Management Board in Wrocław. Later in the same evening, the dam in Stronie Śląskie failed, causing torrents strong enough to completely destroy homes. The towns of Bystrzyca Kłodzka and Lądek-Zdrój and surrounding villages were also badly affected by the flood.

On the night of 15–16 September, the Pilchowice Dam overflowed, resulting in flooding of the towns of Lwówek Śląski, Gryfów Śląski and Wleń. A Czech helicopter contingent stationed in Powidz, Poland, as part of NATO cooperation joined the relief operation in Poland.

On 17 September, the flood hit Lewin Brzeski which became one of the most affected towns with 90% of its total area flooded. The same day, the flood wave reached Szprotawa, where authorities called for evacuations of parts of the town. On the same day the wave reached Żagań, however, the embankments erected by firefighters, town residents, volunteers from neighboring settlements, and Polish and American soldiers stationed in the town, saved it from flooding. Also that day, in Trzebień, Polish firefighters rescued two American soldiers who were swept away by the Bóbr River.

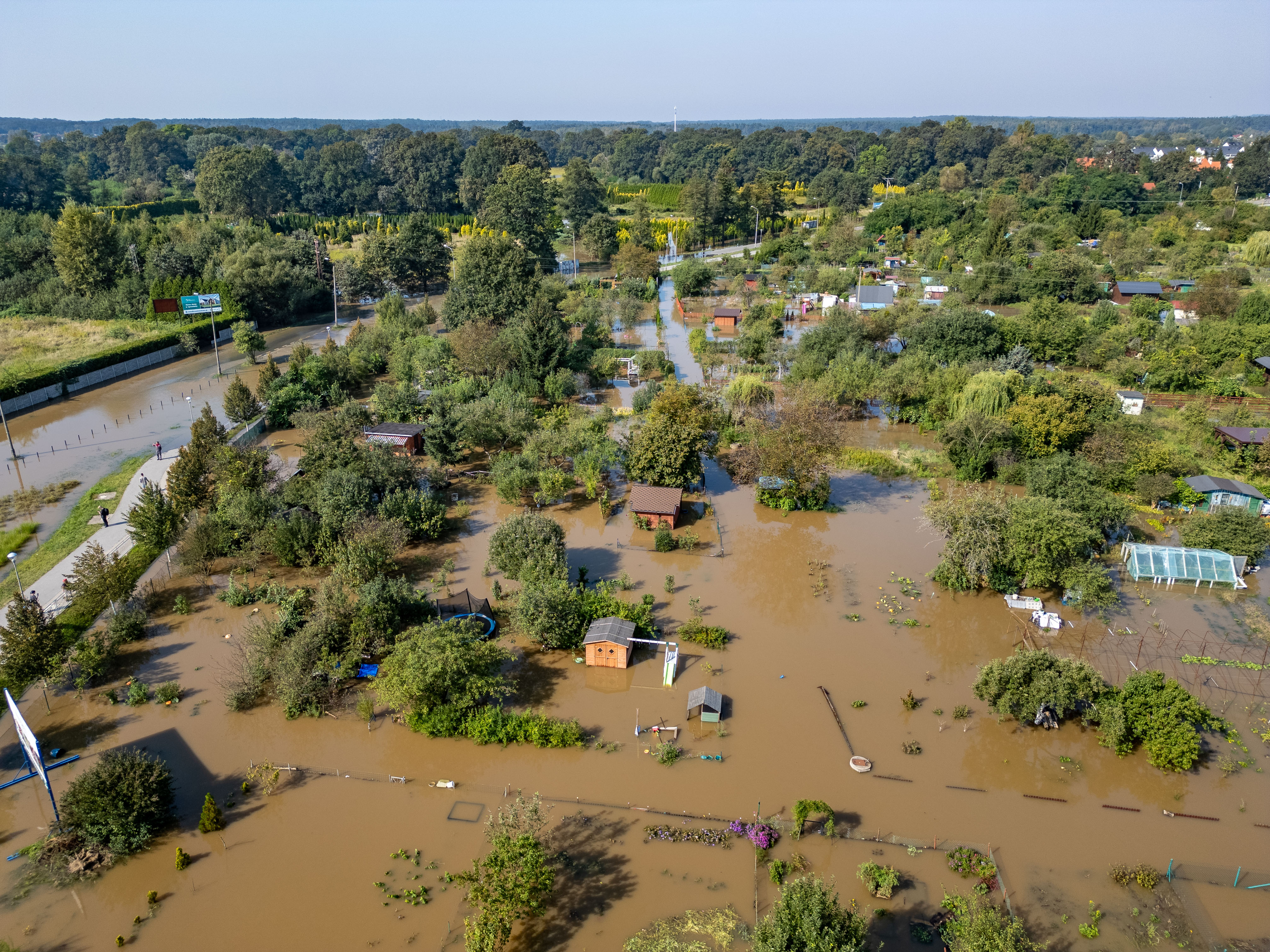
Flooded allotments in Stabłowice, Wrocław, Poland, 18 September

On 18 September, there was partial flooding in the neighborhoods of Marszowice, Stabłowice and Złotniki in Wrocław, however, for the most part, houses and apartment blocks were spared thanks to anti-flood embankments built in the meantime. On 19 September small town Brzeg Dolny was almost flooded, but thanks to firefighters and citizens prevented from flooding. On 21 September, the town of Ścinawa was partly flooded.

On 26 September, two bodies are uncovered at flooded area; one near Głuchołazy and one near Kłodzko. The number of flood victims was officially confirmed as 9.

On 3 October, the flood wave on the Oder reached Gryfino in northwestern Poland with a section of the significant voivodeship road 120, connecting Gryfino with the border with Germany at Mescherin, flooded, so transit was diverted to other roads.

=== Romania ===
Seven people were reported dead as the result of floods in Romania. Galați and Vaslui Counties were severely impacted by the floods caused by Storm Boris, with multiple villages submerged, key infrastructure damaged, and thousands of residents displaced. The region, bordered by the Siret and Prut Rivers, experienced relentless rainfall, which caused these rivers to overflow, wreaking havoc across the area. Several villages were overwhelmed by the flooding, including Slobozia Conachi, Cudalbi, Pechea, Costache Negri, Grivița, and Piscu. In these areas, streets turned into rivers, and homes were submerged under several feet of water. Residents were forced to evacuate, many using boats and makeshift rafts as floodwaters rose rapidly. Several local rivers breached their banks, turning farmlands and residential areas into flooded zones, further complicating rescue operations. Key roads such as DN25 and DN26, which connect rural areas to the city of Galați, were completely cut off, leaving emergency services struggling to reach affected areas. Landslides caused by the heavy rainfall further obstructed transport links, with 100 kilometres of the railway line between Bârlad and Galați closed due to severe damage with parts of the line suspended in mid-air.

=== Slovakia ===
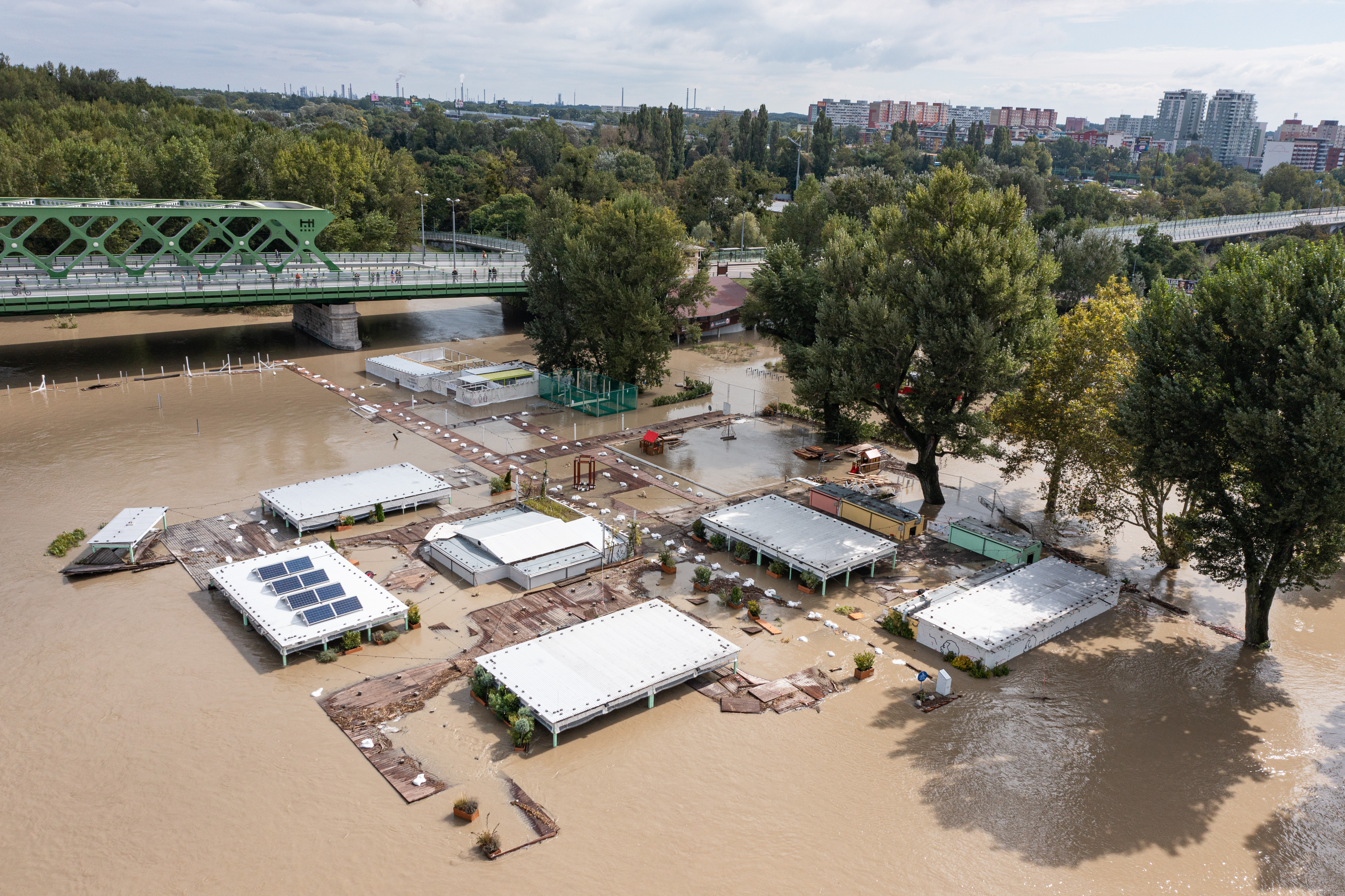
Flooded south bank of the Danube in Bratislava

After a strong wind on the night of 14 to 15 September 2024, which was preceded by several days of heavy rains, water streams in Slovakia also rose. The worst hydrological situation occurred in the basins of the Kysuca and Myjava rivers as well as smaller rivers in the Little Carpathians. The Danube and Morava rivers also rose. Rohožník, Jablonica, Stupava, and Devínska Nová Ves were flooded during night and morning. The Blatina brook overflowed and flooded the parking lot and the underground of an apartment building in Sídlisko Sever II, Pezinok. Orange and red Meteoalarm flood warnings were issued for Western Slovakia on 15 September. At noon on 16 September, the level of the Danube reached a height of 926 centimeters and overflowed onto the Tyrš and Fajnor Embankments in Bratislava. The Danube reached height of 970 centimeters on 17 September, at 2:30 a.m., at 7:00 a.m. The body of a 73-year-old man was found in the flooded basement of a family home in Devín borough, and the level of Danube reached 966 centimeters at 10 a.m. On 18 September, the level of the Danube and Morava in Bratislava peaked between 970 and 980 centimeters, in Devín it reached approximately 910 centimeters.

Although the city centre of Bratislava was mostly unscathed by the floods, several tram lines, the Bratislava Zoo and the Bratislavský lesný park sustained major damage. Damages across the country were estimated at 20 million euros.

=== Hungary ===
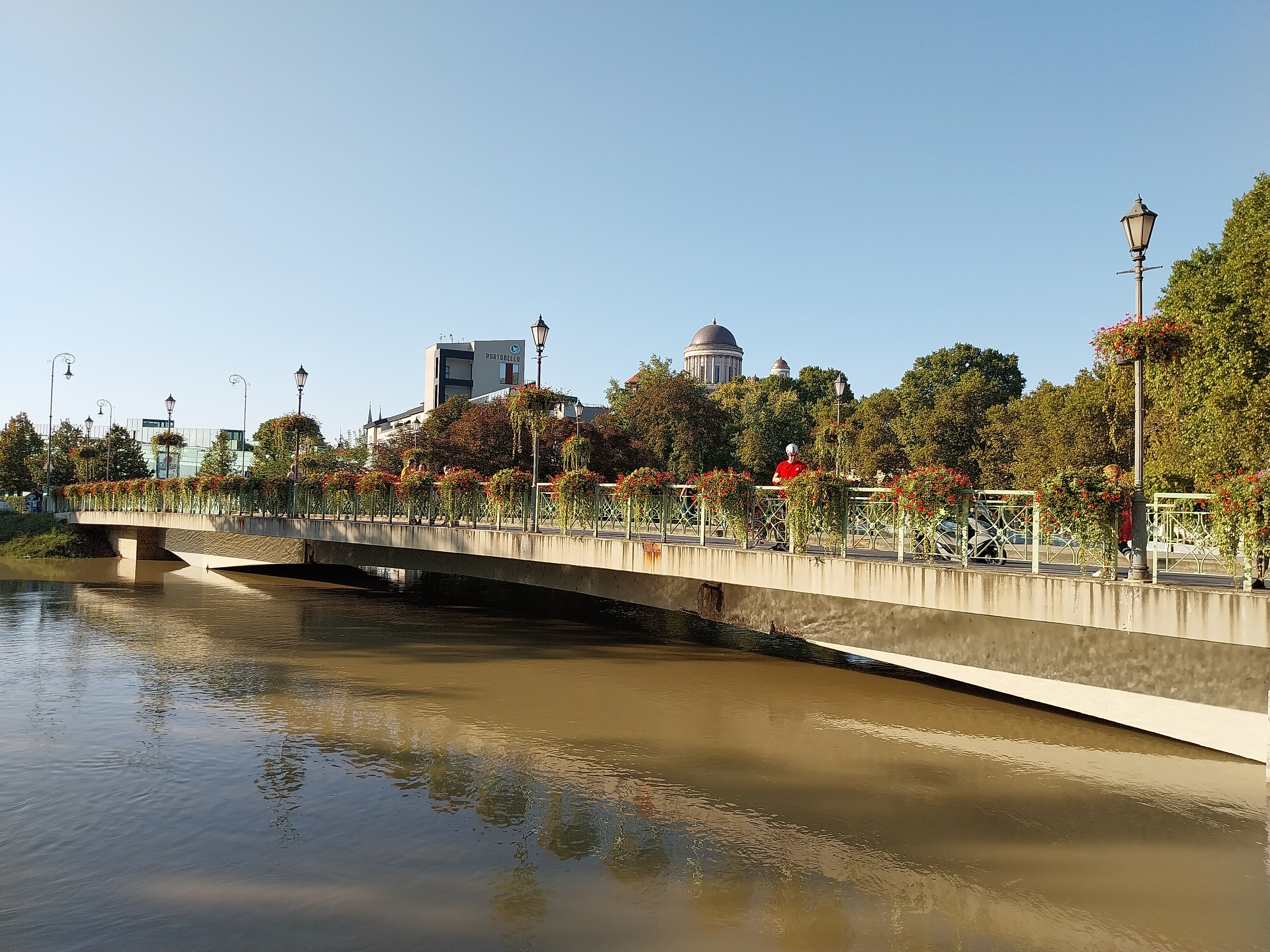
The Little Danube in Esztergom, on 20 September at the Bottyán Bridge

In Hungary the flooding was driven by the downstream propagation of high flows in the Danube River following extreme rainfall in upstream countries during mid-September.

As of 17 September, 500 kilometres (310 mi) of the Danube was under flood warnings in preparation due to rising waters. In Budapest, the city government handed out 1 million sandbags to citizens. Train services between Budapest and Vienna were cancelled. The lower half of Margaret Island was closed off. Péter Magyar was among the first Hungarian politicians to join local volunteers in building flood defenses. His appearance at the site attracted significant media coverage.

As water levels surged, on 21 September the Danube in central Budapest reportedly reached its highest level in around a decade, with water publicly shown at the steps of the Hungarian Parliament building. Emergency workers were deployed along embankments and flood-walls, and images showed significant mobilisation of sand-bagging and protective barriers. One Reuters report also noted that near Budapest an organic-farm operator suffered crop losses when the swollen Danube flooded his land.

=== Croatia ===
On 13-14 September, the low brought a 20 °C (36 °F) temperature drop to Croatia, causing an unseasonable snowfall in the mountains. Croatian authorities reported that the Danube was expected to reach a crest on the Croatia-Serbia border around the weekend of 21-22 September.

The situation worsened into early October. Flash-flood warnings were issued for 3-4 October across parts of the country. On 4 October, in the Karlovac region, 23 houses were reported flooded during the night; in the Ogulin area houses and basements were inundated as water levels climbed in the Sava, Kupa and Odra rivers. The towns of Gračac and Krk reportedly broke their all-time records for daily rainfall amounts.

== Aftermath ==
Polish tennis players Iga Świątek and Hubert Hurkacz assisted in recovery efforts for the flooding in their country of birth, with Hurkacz pledging to donate 100 euros for every ace he served.

In Slovakia, the Archdiocese of Bratislava raised funds via its regular charitable campaign, the St. Martin charity collection, held on 10 November 2024. The campaign yielded €171,700, which in January 2025 was earmarked for home and infrastructure renovations in the Diocese of Ostrava‑Opava, helping families whose homes were destroyed or damaged by the floods.

The European Commission proposed in May 2025 to allocate €280 million from the European Union Solidarity Fund (EUSF) to support recovery in affected countries including Austria, Czechia, Poland and Slovakia. Of that amount, €114 million was proposed for Czechia, €76 million for Poland, €42.8 million for Austria and €2.1 million for Slovakia. The funds were intended for repairing damaged infrastructure, temporary housing, reinforcing preventive flood defences, and protecting cultural heritage. In Poland, the government announced the mobilisation of up to PLN 23 billion for flood relief and reconstruction, partly drawing on the European Union funds. Meanwhile the Czech parliament approved increasing the 2024 budget deficit to accommodate around CZK 30 billion in flood-relief expenditures.

== Analysis maps ==
Analysis maps of the European Union ERCC – Emergency Response Coordination Centre are featured below.

12 September 2024

16 September 2024

18 September 2024

20 September 2024

27 September 2024

== See also ==
- 2024 European floods
- 1910 European Floods – Historic flooding in Central Europe that resulted in the deaths of more than a thousand people.
- 2023 Slovenia floods
- 2023 Emilia-Romagna floods
- 2024 Emilia-Romagna floods
- 2021 European floods
- 2013 European floods
- 2012 Romanian floods
- 2010 Central European floods
- 2009 European floods
- 2002 European floods
- 1997 Central European flood
- 1970 floods in Romania
