= Świdnica Miasto railway station =

Railway station in Poland

Świdnica Miasto
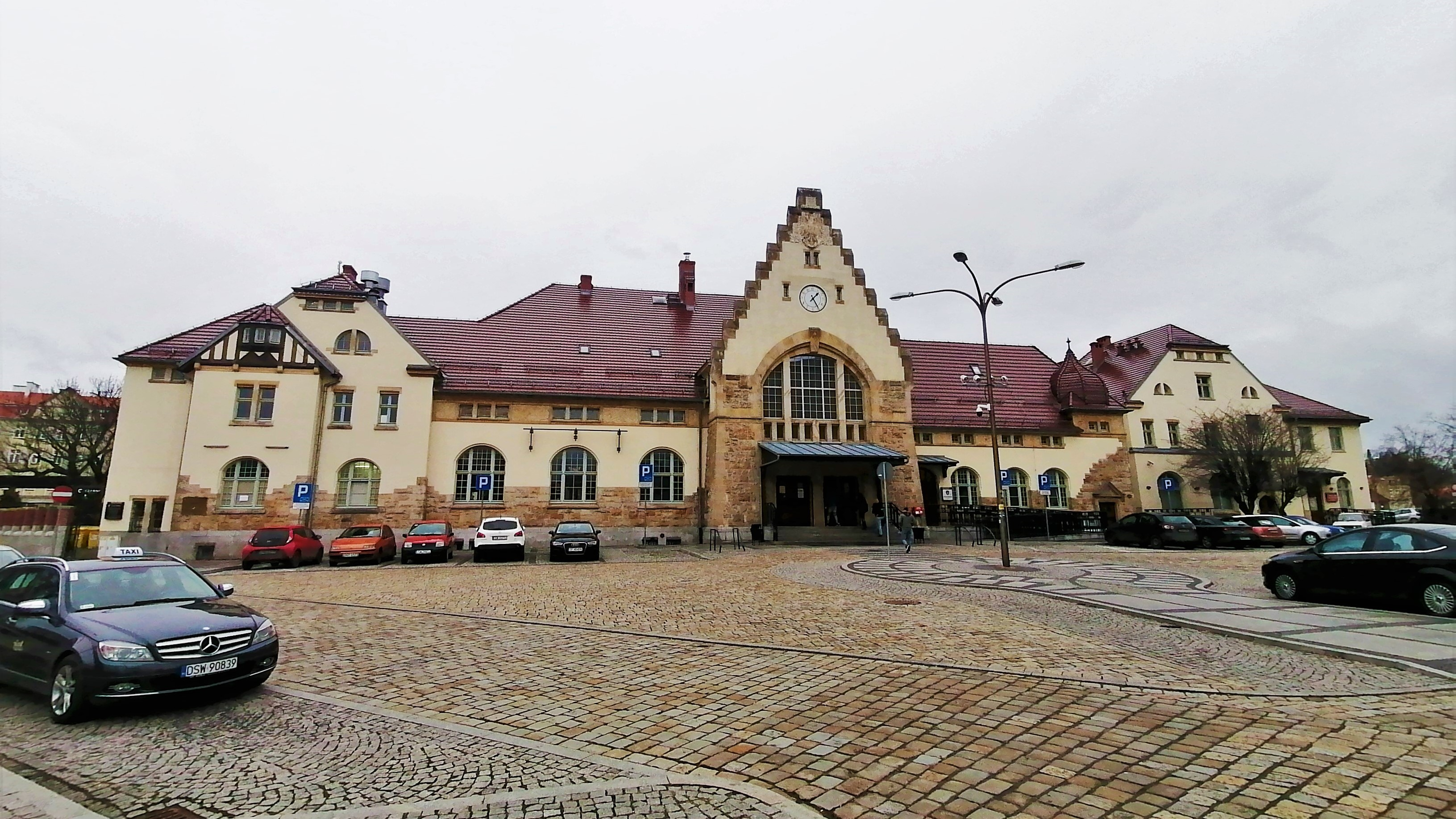
- Świdnica Miasto station building in 2022

General information
- Location: Świdnica, Lower Silesian Voivodeship; Poland
- Coordinates: 50°50′27.91″N 16°28′55.17″E
- Owner: Polish State Railways
- Lines: Katowice–Legnica; Świdnica Miasto–Świdnica Przedmieście
- Platforms: 2
- Tracks: 3
- Train operators: PKP Intercity; Lower Silesian Railways

History
- Opened: 1844
- Former names: Schweidnitz (from 1855); Schweidnitz Oberstadt (before 1910); Schweidnitz Hauptbahnhof (before 1943); Świdnica Główna (before 1949)

Services
Preceding station	KD	Following station
Świdnica Zawiszów towards Legnica	D91	Krzyżowa towards Kłodzko Miasto
Location
- Location within Poland Location within Lower Silesian Voivodeship

Świdnica Miasto (German: Schweidnitz Oberstadt) is a railway station in Świdnica, in the Lower Silesian Voivodeship in Poland. Opened by the Wrocław-Świdnica-Świebodzice Railway Company in 1844.

== History ==
It was established in 1844 as Schweidnitz during the construction of the line from Jaworzyna Śląska to Świdnica. Originally, it was a terminal station and was located outside the borders of the then fortress at the junction of the present Waleriana Łukasińskiego and Kanonierska streets. It was moved to its current location during the extension of the line to Dzierżoniów. In 1898, the station became a junction after the construction of the line from Wrocław Główny via Kobierzyce and Sobótka. Until 1910, it bore the name Schweidnitz Oberstadt. After 1945, the name was first changed to Świdnica Główna, then to Świdnica Górne Miasto, and finally to Świdnica Miasto.

On 12 June 2022, after 22 years, the station regained its connection with Wrocław via Sobótka. From 24 June 2023, the station obtained a connection with Jedlina-Zdrój, and from 10 December 2023, daily services were introduced.

The station building (constructed in 1905) is in good condition. It is located in the very center of the city at Grunwaldzki Square. In November 2010, the renovation of the station began. The renovated building was reopened for use on 15 December 2013.

== Train services ==
The station is served by the following services:

- Regional services (KD) Wrocław - Sobótka - Świdnica
- Regional services (KD) Wrocław - Jaworzyna Śląska - Świdnica - Bielawa
- Regional services (KD) Wrocław - Jaworzyna Śląska - Świdnica - Głuszyca
- Regional services (KD) Legnica - Świdnica - Kłodzko
