= Jelenia Góra–Polana Jakuszyce railway =

Cross-border railway line in south-west Poland

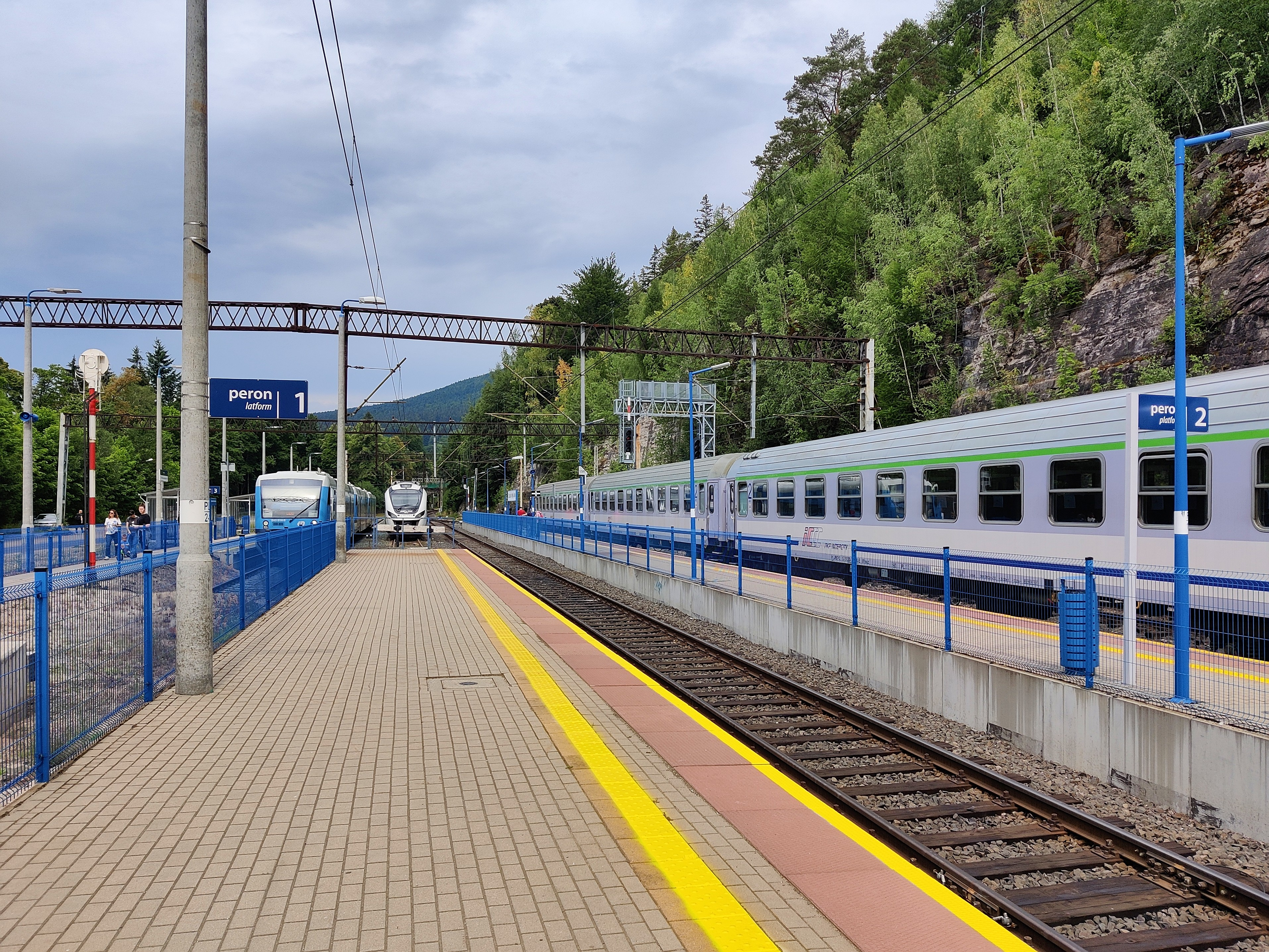
- Szklarska Poręba Górna

Overview
- Native name: Kolej Izerska
- Status: Operational
- Owner: PKP Polskie Linie Kolejowe
- Line number: PKP 311
- Locale: Poland
- Termini: Jelenia Góra; Szklarska Poręba

The Jelenia Góra–Polana Jakuszyce railway, also known as the Izera railway (Polish: Kolej Izerska, German: Zackenbahn) is a double-track, partially electrified railway line connecting Jelenia Góra railway station in Jelenia Góra and Polana Jakuszycka railway station in Jakuszyce in the Lower Silesian Voivodeship in south-western Poland.

It is part of the former Prussian Zackenbahn, that used to connect Prussia with the Austro-Hungarian Empire via the New World Pass. The line is currently operated by Polish State Railways as line number 311.

== History ==
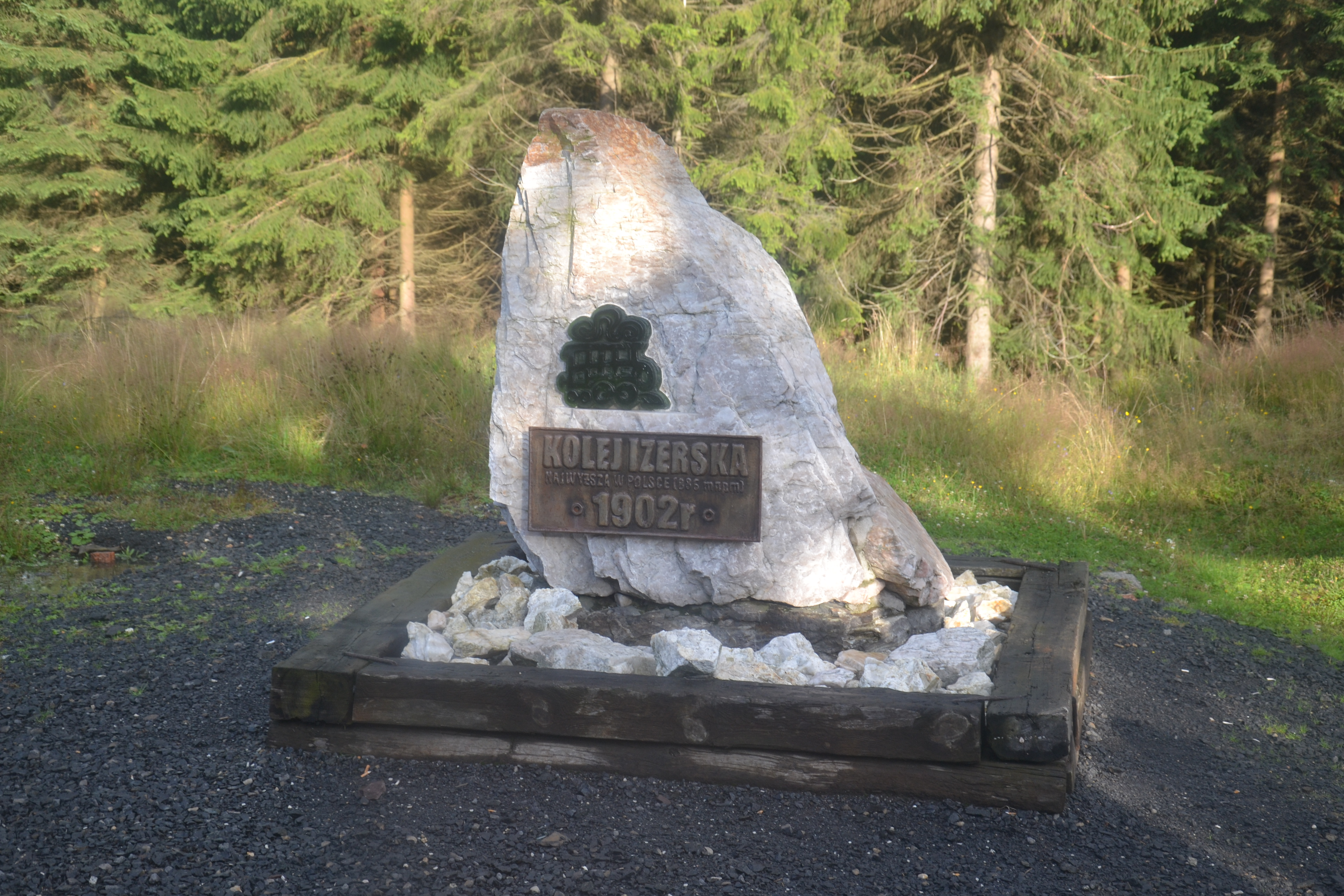
Memorial in Szklarska Poręba

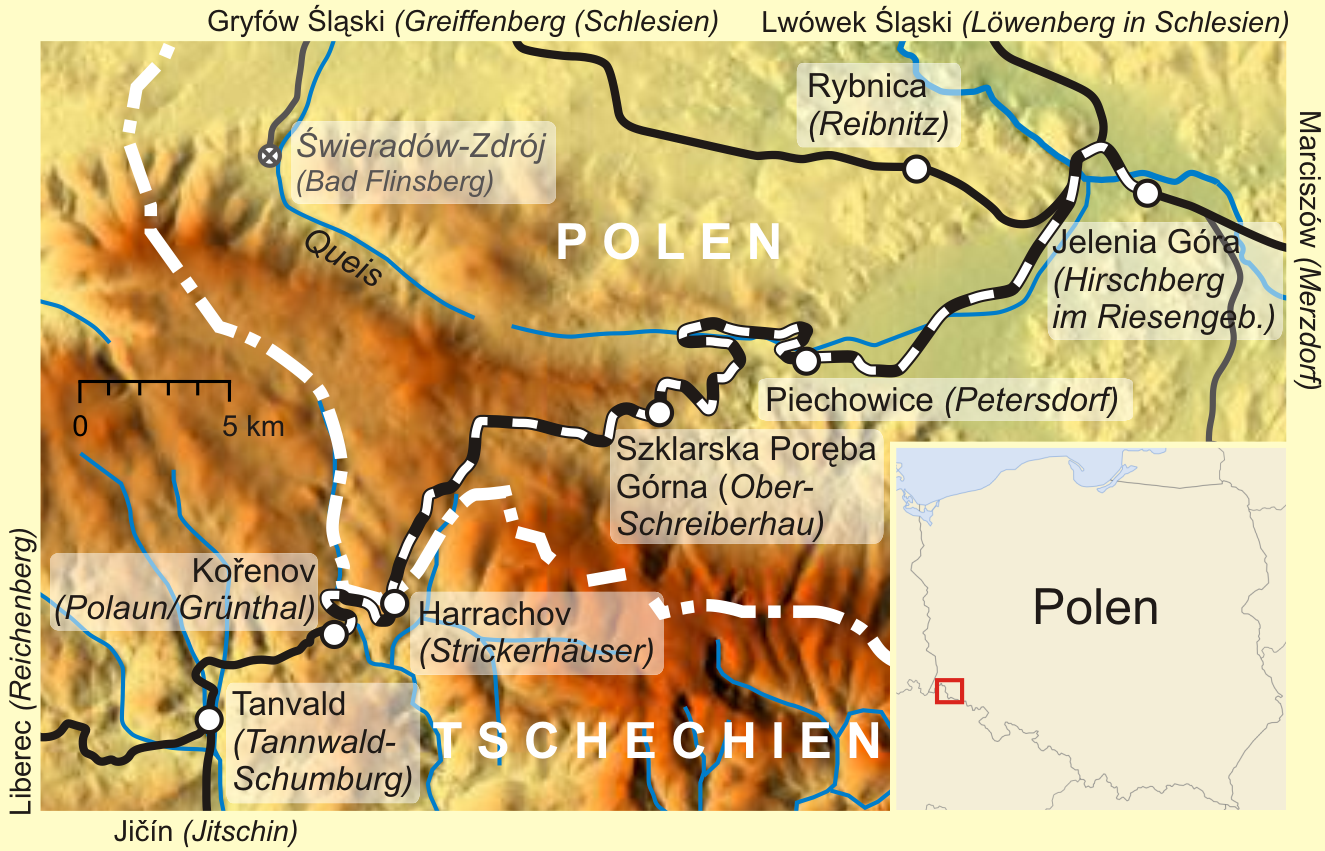
Rail transport map of Zackenbahn

The name comes from Jizera Mountains. The first section at the foothills of the Krkonoše was completed in 1891. The mountain section took several more years to finish. The railway station Jakobsthal (Jakuszyce) close to the New World Pass became the highest railway station in Prussia. The terminal station was Polaun/Grünthal (Kořenov). The complete track was opened in 1902, together with the Cog railway Tannwald–Grünthal. The line was electrified in 1923.

In April 1945 most of the locomotives were evacuated. Some were captured in the border station Polaun/Grünthal by the advancing Red Army. After the war, the electric equipment was dismantled and together with the remaining locomotives transported to the Soviet Union as reparation.

Silesia was transferred to Poland, and cross-border traffic was abolished. Following an exchange of border territories between Czechoslovakia and Poland, the Bohemian part was extended to Harrachov, and that became the new terminal station.

Polish State Railways (PKP) operated passenger trains as far as Szklarska Poręba Huta and freight trains as far as Jakuszyce. The track as far as Szklarska Poręba Górna was electrified again in 1987. Except for a one-day celebration on the 100th anniversary in 2002, cross border traffic was never restored. Due to decision of the Common Monitoring Committee of Operational Programme of European Transborder Cooperation Czech Republic - Poland 2007-2013 the execution of the project "Revitalization of the Railway Line Szklarska Poreba - Harrachov" will be provided. This project has been recommended to be awarded a subsidy. The reconstruction work started in June 2009 on the Polish side, in October 2009 also on the Czech side. The regular public rail transport across the border started on 28 August 2010. Until 12 December 2015 trains were operated both by a Polish company Polregio and a Czech company Viamont A.S. (later GW Train Regio), now they are operated both by Polish company Lower Silesian Railways and České dráhy; on the non-electrified section using the latter's Stadler Regio-Shuttle RS1 diesel trains.

== See also ==
- Polish rail border crossings
