= Kłodzko Główne railway station =

Railway station in Poland

Kłodzko Główne Kłodzko Main
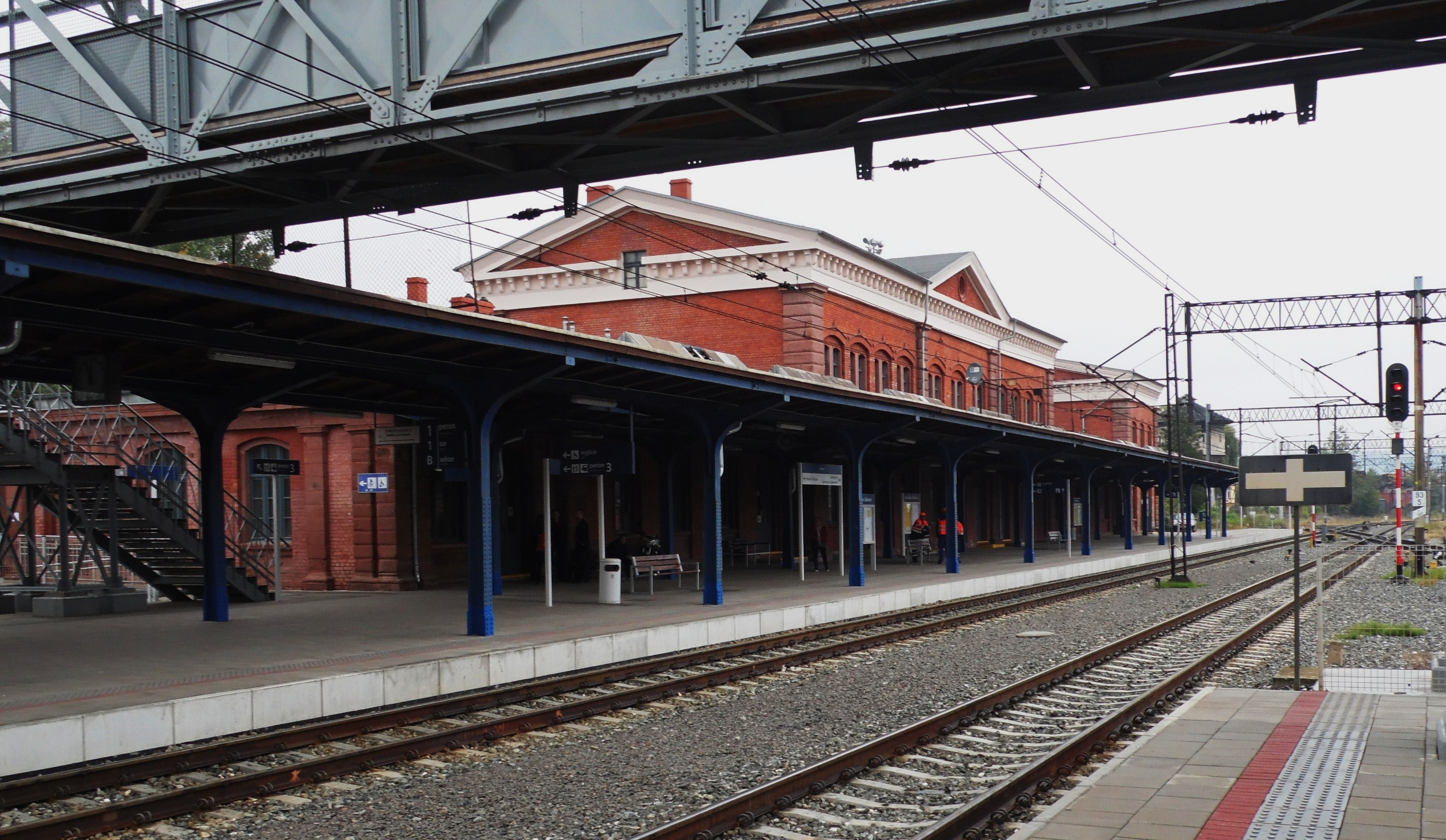
- Kłodzko Główne railway station in 2019

General information
- Location: Kłodzko, Lower Silesian Voivodeship; Poland
- Coordinates: 50°27′4.44″N 16°39′24.45″E
- Owner: Polskie Linie Kolejowe
- Lines: Wrocław–Międylesie; Kłodzko–Wałbrzych
- Platforms: 4
- Tracks: 7
- Train operators: PKP Intercity; Lower Silesian Railways; Polregio

History
- Opened: 1874
- Electrified: 1991
- Former names: Glatz Hauptbahnhof (before 1945); Kładzko (before 1946); Kłodzko (before 1948)

Services
Preceding station	KD	Following station
Ławica towards Wrocław Główny	D90	Kłodzko Miasto towards Kudowa-Zdrój
Ławica towards Legnica	D91	Kłodzko Miasto Terminus
Bierkowice towards Wałbrzych Miasto	D96	Kłodzko Miasto towards Kudowa-Zdrój
Location
- Location within Poland Location within Lower Silesian Voivodeship

Kłodzko Główne (lit. 'Kłodzko Main'; German: Glatz Hauptbahnhof) is the main railway station in Kłodzko, in the Lower Silesian Voivodeship in Poland, it is currently losing significance as a junction for the Wrocław–Międzylesie railway and the Kłodzko–Wałbrzych railway (trains also run from there to Kudowa-Zdrój and substitute bus services to Stronie Śląskie), with considerable freight traffic. According to Polish State Railways (PKP) classification, it is categorized as a regional station. This station was opened on 21 September 1874, and until 1993, a locomotive depot operated at the station.

Between 2012 and 2013, a thorough renovation of the station was carried out at a cost of just under 4 million PLN, with the investment financed from the state budget and PKP's own funds. The ceremonial opening of the comprehensively renovated station took place on 25 April 2013. In August 2017, a contract was signed for the comprehensive modernization of the station.

== Passenger traffic ==
Year	Passenger exchange per day
2017	500-699
2022	300-499

== Train services ==
The station is served by the following services:

- Regional services (KD) Wrocław - Kłodzko Główne - Kudowa-Zdrój
- Regional services (KD) Legnica - Świdnica - Kłodzko
- Regional services (KD) Wałbrzych - Kłodzko - Kudowa-Zdrój
