= Lower Silesian Regional Railways =

Short-lived heritage rail operator in Poland

- Native name: Dolnośląskie Koleje Regionalne
- Type: Private
- Industry: Rail transport
- Founded: 2002
- Defunct: 2006
- Successor: Lower Silesian Railways
- Area served: Lower Silesia

Lower Silesian Regional Railways (Polish: Dolnośląskie Koleje Regionalne; DKR) was a short-lived privately-owned rail operator intended to serve the Lower Silesian Voivodeship of Poland. Founded in 2002, its aim was to reopen and serve disused railway lines in Lower Silesia, operating as a heritage railway in hopes of preventing the future closure of other lines. The company was succeeded by the state-owned rail operator, Lower Silesian Railways, in 2008.

== History ==
Lower Silesian Regional Railways (DKR) was founded in 2002, as one of the first privately owned rail operators in Poland after Polish State Railways's (PKP) restructuring the year prior. The aim of DKR was to reopen and serve railway lines that had been previously closed by PKP in the 1990s, specifically in Lower Silesia. DKR hoped that this would result in preventing further closure of railway lines by PKP.

DKR leased its first line from PKP, the Wrocław–Trzebnica railway in 2002, which closed to passenger services in 1991, operating freight trains until 1999. Despite the line's closure, it had not been dismantled, just in poor condition. At the same time, DKR purchased two 102A DKR Ryflaki carriages and leased a diesel shunting locomotive to operate its services as heritage railway. DKR restored the railway for basic operation, and announced in February 2005 that passenger services will soon commence. However, on 10 February, just over a week prior to the scheduled reopening ceremony on 18 February, around 20 m (66 ft) of track of the line was stolen. The tracks were replaced in late February, however, despite the repair, on 9 March, Polskie Linie Kolejowe (PLK) denied authorisation for DKR to operate the line after a safety concern was raised that DKR carriages stabled at Wrocław Zakrzów railway station may be illegally uncoupled from the locomotive with malicious intent, causing the carriages to roll down the Down line connecting to the main line, risking a collision with a passing freight train.

After safety equipment was installed at the end of the line preventing any accidents, services commenced sometime in mid-2005. A farewell trip was held on 7 October 2006, when the last DKR train closed the Wrocław–Trzebnica railway once again, this was after PLK terminated the leasing contract after threatening to dismantle the line.

In December 2007, Lower Silesian Railways (KD) was founded, a rail operator also serving Lower Silesia but fully owned by the Lower Silesian Voivodeship. The following year, DKR entered a partnership with KD. As KD was still seeking rolling stock, the company leased the two 102A Ryflaki carriages from DKR, intending them to be used as reserved stock. The two carriages were transported to be stored at Miłkowice Depot, where they were extensively modernised and refurbished. Despite this, they were never used in regular services, and were kept at the depot until 2016, when they were purchased by Shortlines to operate on their seasonal routes.

In 2007, the Lower Silesian Voivodeship took over the Wrocław–Trzebnica railway in plans to reopen the line operating under KD. The line was rebuilt and extensively modernised between 2008 and 2009, reopening on 20 September 2009.
