= Szklarska Poręba Górna railway station =

Railway station in Szklarska Poręba, Poland

Szklarska Poręba Górna
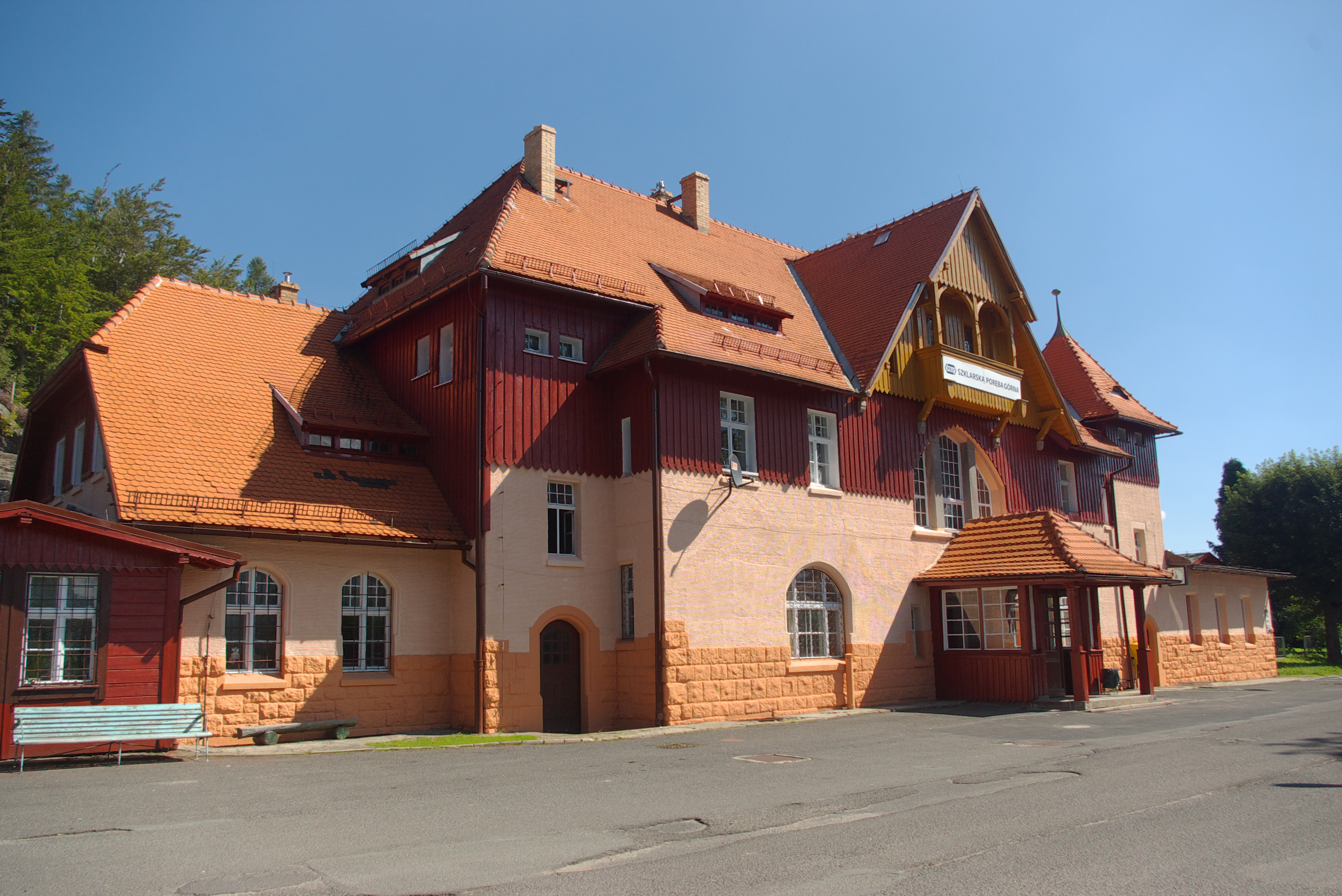
- Station building

General information
- Location: Szklarska Poręba Górna, Szklarska Poręba, Lower Silesian Voivodeship; Poland
- Coordinates: 50°49′57.0″N 15°31′08.0″E
- Owner: Polish State Railways
- Line: Jelenia Góra–Jakuszyce
- Platforms: 4

History
- Opened: 25 June 1902 (current location)
- Former names: Schreiberhau (1902–1904); Ober Schreiberhau (1904–1945); Pisarzewiec Górny (1945–1946)

Services
Preceding station	KD	Following station
Szklarska Poręba Średnia towards Wrocław Główny	D60	Terminus
Location
- Location within Poland Location within Lower Silesian Voivodeship

Szklarska Poręba Górna is a railway station on the Jelenia Góra–Jakuszyce railway in the Szklarska Poręba Górna district of Szklarska Poręba, Karkonosze County, within the Lower Silesian Voivodeship in south-western Poland.

== History ==
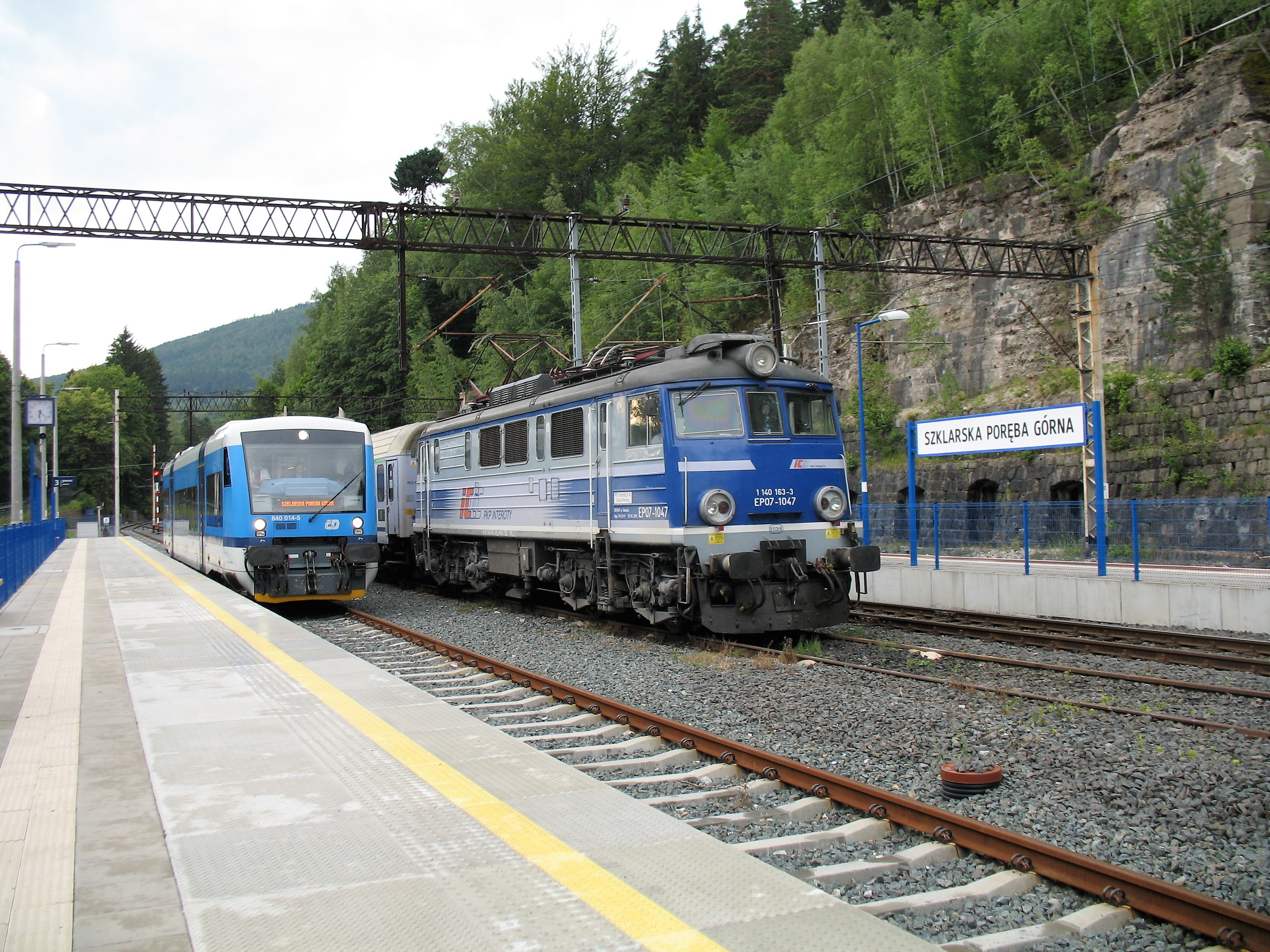
PKP Intercity and České dráhy trains at the station in 2017

The station was opened by Prussian State Railways Schreiberhau on 25 June 1902. It was renamed in 1904 to Ober Schreiberhau. After World War II, the area came under Polish administration. As a result, the station was taken over by Polish State Railways (PKP) and was renamed to Pisarzewiec Górny, and later to its modern name, Szklarska Poręba Górna, in 1946.

Szklarska Poręba Górna was briefly closed in 2010–2013 during extensive reconstruction and modernisation works of the Jelenia Góra–Jakuszyce railway, which included the construction of new high-level platforms at the station. The modernisation reduced the overall journey time between Wrocław Główny and the station. Szklarska Poręba Górna reopened in November 2013.

In 2025, Szklarska Poręba Górna was rated the best tourist-friendly railway station (in the smaller stations category) in the world by the International Union of Railways.

== Accidents and incidents ==
- On 9 August 1976 multiple runaway freight wagons from a siding at a nearby mine collided into a locomotive that was stationary at the station. The cause of the accident was poorly conducted shunting operations, and no securing of the wagons, which led them move uncontrollably down the Down line.

== Train services ==
The station is served by the following services:

- Regional services (KD) Wrocław - Wałbrzych - Jelenia Góra - Szklarska Poręba Górna
