= Jelcz-Laskowice railway station =

Railway station in Jelcz-Laskowice

Jelcz-Laskowice
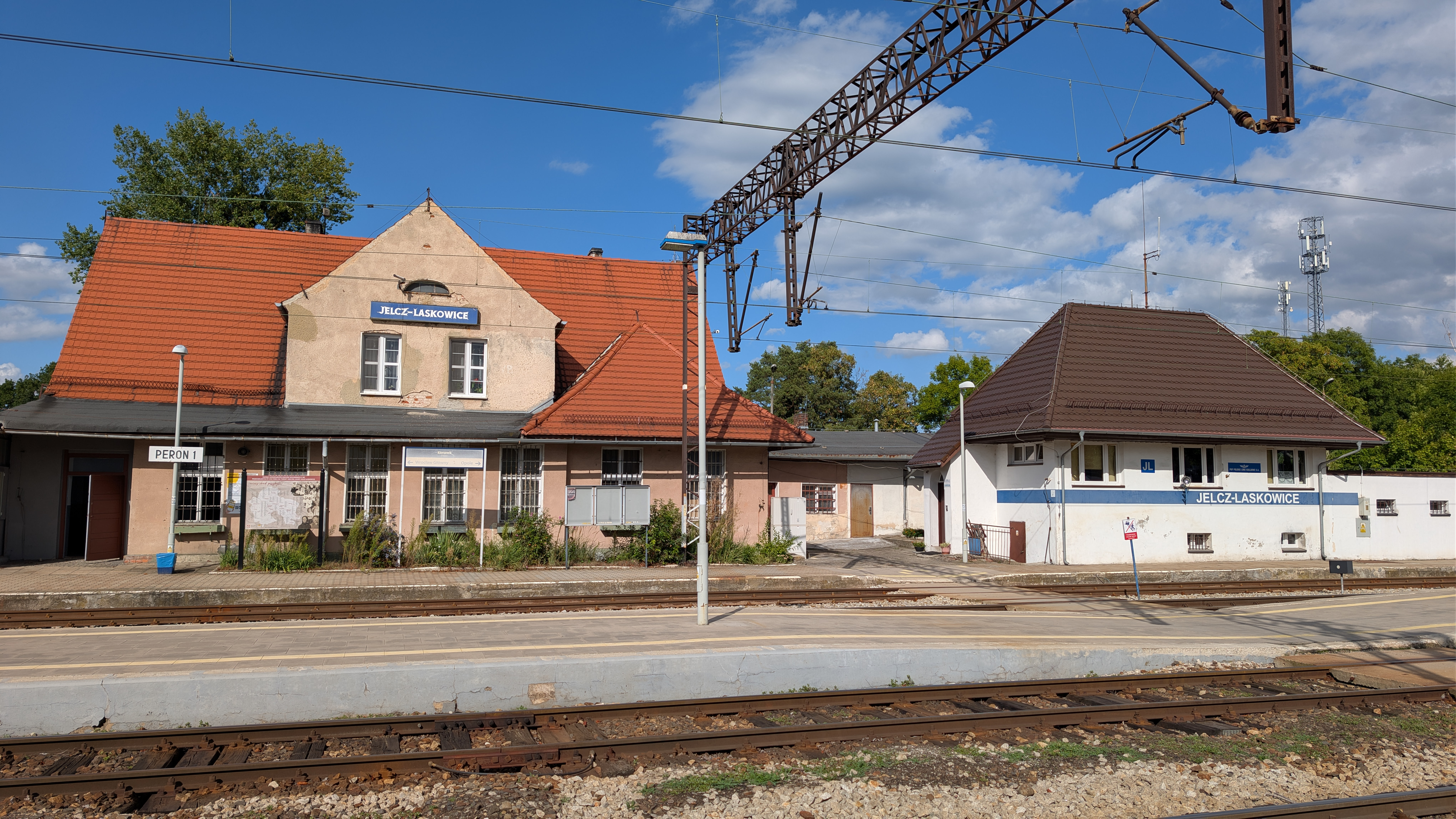
- Station building and signalbox in August 2026

General information
- Location: Jelcz-Laskowice, Lower Silesian Voivodeship; Poland
- Coordinates: 50°53′04.9″N 15°49′17.5″E
- Owner: Polish State Railways
- Line: Opole Groszowice–Wrocław Brochów
- Platforms: 5

History
- Opened: 1 October 1909
- Former names: Laskowitz Beckern (1909–1937); Markstädt (1937–1945); Piekary Wrocławskie (1945–1946); Laskowice Piekary (1946–1947); Laskowice Oławskie (1947–1956); Laskowice Jelcz (1956–1993)
Location
- Location within Poland Location within Lower Silesian Voivodeship

Jelcz-Laskowice is a railway station in the town of Jelcz-Laskowice, Oława County, within the Lower Silesian Voivodeship in south-western Poland

== History ==
The station was opened by Prussian State Railways as Laskowitz Beckern on 1 October 1909. It was renamed to Markstädt in 1937. After World War II, the area came under Polish administration. As a result, the station was taken over by Polish State Railways and was renamed to Piekary Wrocławskie. The station was renamed four more times; Laskowice Piekary in 1946, Laskowice Oławskie in 1947, Laskowice Jelcz in 1956, and finally to its modern name, Jelcz-Laskowice, in 1993.

== Station ==
4 km (2.5 mi) long sidings once branched of the station to Jelcz vehicle factory; they are now dismantled. An additional 11 tracks once operated at the station, they were used for shunting and stabling trains.

== Train services ==
The station is served by the following services:

- Regional services (KD) Wrocław - Siechnice - Jelcz-Laskowice
- Regional services (KD) Wrocław - Siechnice - Jelcz-Laskowice - Biskupice Oławskie
- Regional services (KD) Wrocław - Dobrzykowice - Jelcz-Laskowice
