= Kłodzko Miasto railway station =

Railway station in south western Poland

Kłodzko Miasto Kłodzko Town
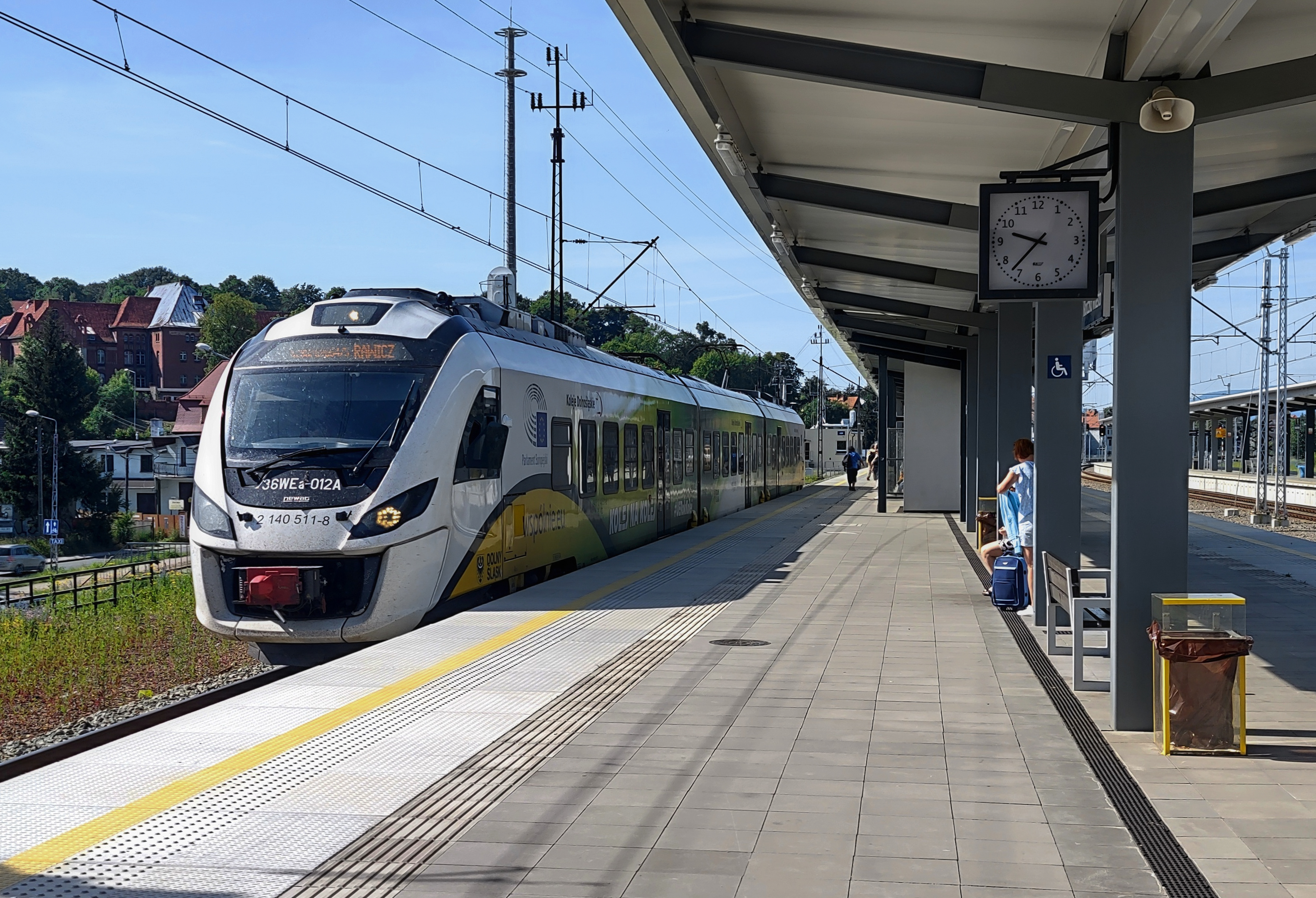
- Kłodzko Miasto railway station in 2023

General information
- Location: Kłodzko, Lower Silesian Voivodeship; Poland
- Coordinates: 50°26′09.01″N 16°39′31.00″E
- Owner: Polskie Linie Kolejowe
- Line: Wrocław–Międzylesie
- Platforms: 2
- Tracks: 4
- Train operators: PKP Intercity; Lower Silesian Railways

History
- Opened: 1875
- Rebuilt: 2021
- Electrified: 1994
- Former names: Glatz Stadt (before 1945); Kładzko Miasto (1945–1946)

Services
| Preceding station | KD | Following station |
|---|---|---|
| Kłodzko Główne towards Wrocław Główny | D90 | Kłodzko Książek towards Kudowa-Zdrój |
| Kłodzko Główne towards Wałbrzych Miasto | D96 | Kłodzko Książek towards Kudowa-Zdrój |
Location
- Location within Poland Location within Lower Silesian Voivodeship

Kłodzko Miasto (lit. 'Kłodzko Town'; German: Glatz Stadt) is a railway station in the town of Kłodzko, in the Lower Silesian Voivodeship in south western Poland. The station is located in the very center of the town, on the right bank of the Eastern Neisse river. It is approximately 370 meters southeast of the town square, i.e., Bolesław Chrobry Square. According to PKP classification, it is categorized as a regional station.

== History ==
=== 1875–1900 ===
In 1875, Kłodzko Główne railway station was built, which was located far from the town (situated in the village of Goszyce), making it considerably difficult for passengers to use. Therefore, the city authorities decided to construct a passenger stop near the current pl. Jedności. The land for its construction was provided to the railway by the city free of charge. The newly established railway station was squeezed between the existing buildings. The increase in passenger traffic made its expansion necessary, which was discussed during city council sessions.

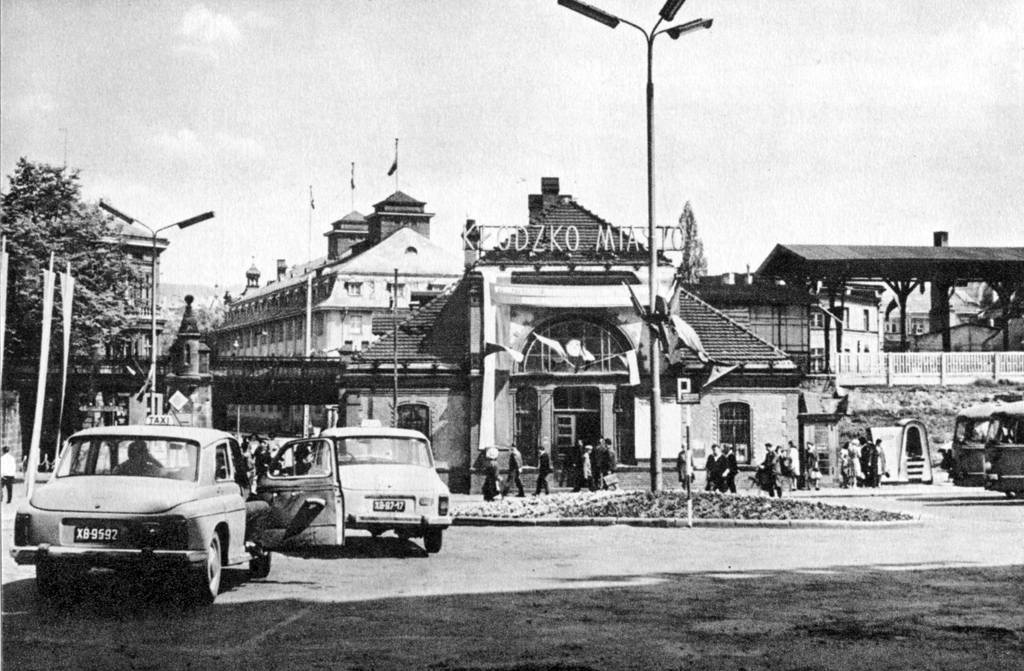
Station building that was demolished in the 1970s

=== 1900–1945 ===
At the beginning of the 20th century, a small city station building was erected. The existing railway station was a temporary solution, which is the reason a plan for its reconstruction was developed before the First World War. The costs of this project were estimated at 16 million marks, and therefore it was abandoned. In 1934, these plans were revisited. The investment was to be carried out over 5 years and was expected to cost about 4 million new marks. The project was to provide employment for 200 people, which would significantly reduce the unemployment that prevailed in Kłodzko at that time.

After a year, the effects of the initial works were visible: a high embankment and an overpass were completed, and the surrounding streets were reconstructed. Additionally, two more platforms were built, each having two edges. The layout of the existing platform was corrected. A connection between the platforms was made via an underground passage, along with a technical tunnel with shafts for freight elevators. As a result of the outbreak of World War II in 1939, the project was not completed.

=== After 1945 ===
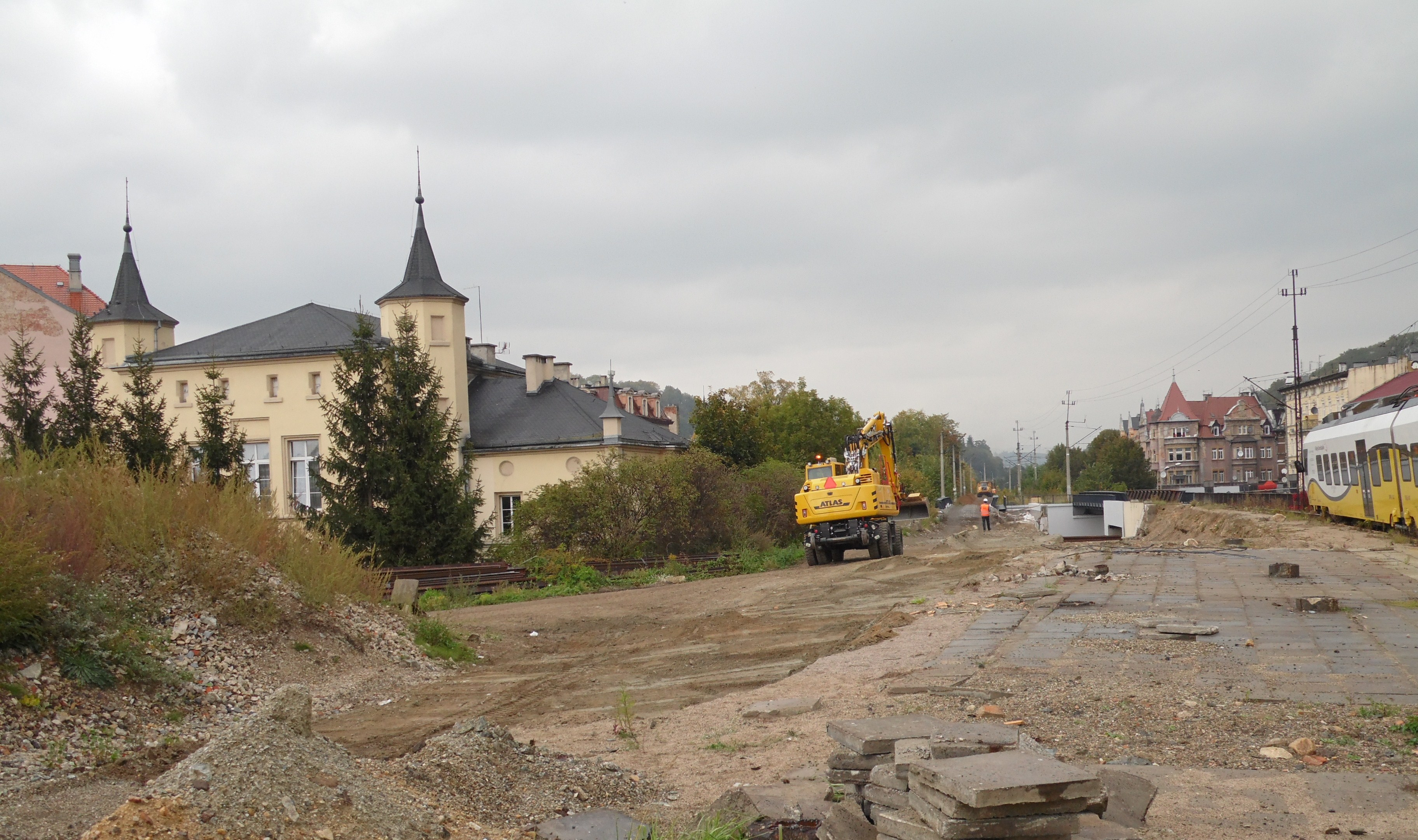
Railway station during its reconstruction in 2019

After World War II, the area came under Polish administration. As a result, the station was taken over by Polish State Railways. In the 1970s, in connection with the redevelopment of Unity Square, plans for the expansion of the railway station were revisited. At that time, among other things, abutments were built for an additional viaduct over the roadway leading to the third track. However, the work was soon halted, citing financial reasons and the necessity of demolishing the PKS station. On this occasion, in 1974, the station building was demolished. In the same year, a modest ticket office building was constructed between the tracks, which also housed a waiting room. In January 2021, the modernization with the reconstruction of the railway stop into a railway station was completed. A second platform and a KM signal box were built. A ramp to platform 1 from Kościuszko Street was constructed, and elevators were installed to all platforms. Trains can now terminate or commence a journey. The contract in this matter was signed on 11 June 2018, with the company Infra Silesia.

== Passenger traffic and trains ==
| Year | Passenger exchange per day |
|---|---|
| 2017 | 1,100 |
| 2022 | 1,800 |

Passenger trains on the Międzylesie (Bystrzyca Kłodzka Przedmieście)–Wrocław Główny route and back, as well as from Kudowa-Zdrój to Legnica and from Kudowa-Zdrój to Wałbrzych Główny, operated by Lower Silesian Railways, Polregio, and PKP Intercity, pass through Kłodzko Miasto. Additionally, several times a day freight trains, mainly from Wrocław and Kłodzko Główny, including those owned by the company PKP Cargo, pass through the station.

== Railway lines ==
Through the town of Kłodzko passes Wrocław–Międzylesie railway, as well as Kłodzko–Kudowa-Zdrój railway. (Note: According to some studies, this line does not start from Kłodzko Główne station, but from the Kłodzko Nowe junction post.) The first of these has been fully electrified since the 1990s and is double-tracked. The second, is non-electrified and single-tracked.

Maximum operatable speeds of railway lines near Kłodzko Miasto
| Railway line | Passenger trains (also railbuses) | Freight trains |
|---|---|---|
| Wrocław–Międzylesie railway | 80 km/h (50 mph) | 80 km/h (50 mph) |
| Kłodzko–Kudowa Zdrój railway | 30 km/h (19 mph) | 30 km/h (19 mph) |

== Infrastructure ==
=== Station building ===
The station building was demolished in 1974 in connection with the planned modernization and reconstruction of the local railway station. It was replaced by a hastily constructed ticket office building, located between two tracks on the first platform, which was situated on an overpass between Jedności Square and Słowackiego Street. In 2019, during the station's reconstruction, the building was demolished, and currently, there are no ticket offices or waiting rooms. There are two entrances to the station: the first from the side of Jedności and Kościuszki Square, and the second from Słowackiego Street.

=== Platforms ===
The station has two platforms, each with two platform edges and canopies. Each platform can be accessed by an elevator.

== Train services ==
The station is served by the following services:

- Regional services (KD) Wrocław - Kłodzko Główne - Kudowa-Zdrój
- Regional services (KD) Wałbrzych - Kłodzko - Kudowa-Zdrój
