= Lower Silesian Railways =

Railway operator of Lower Silesia, Poland

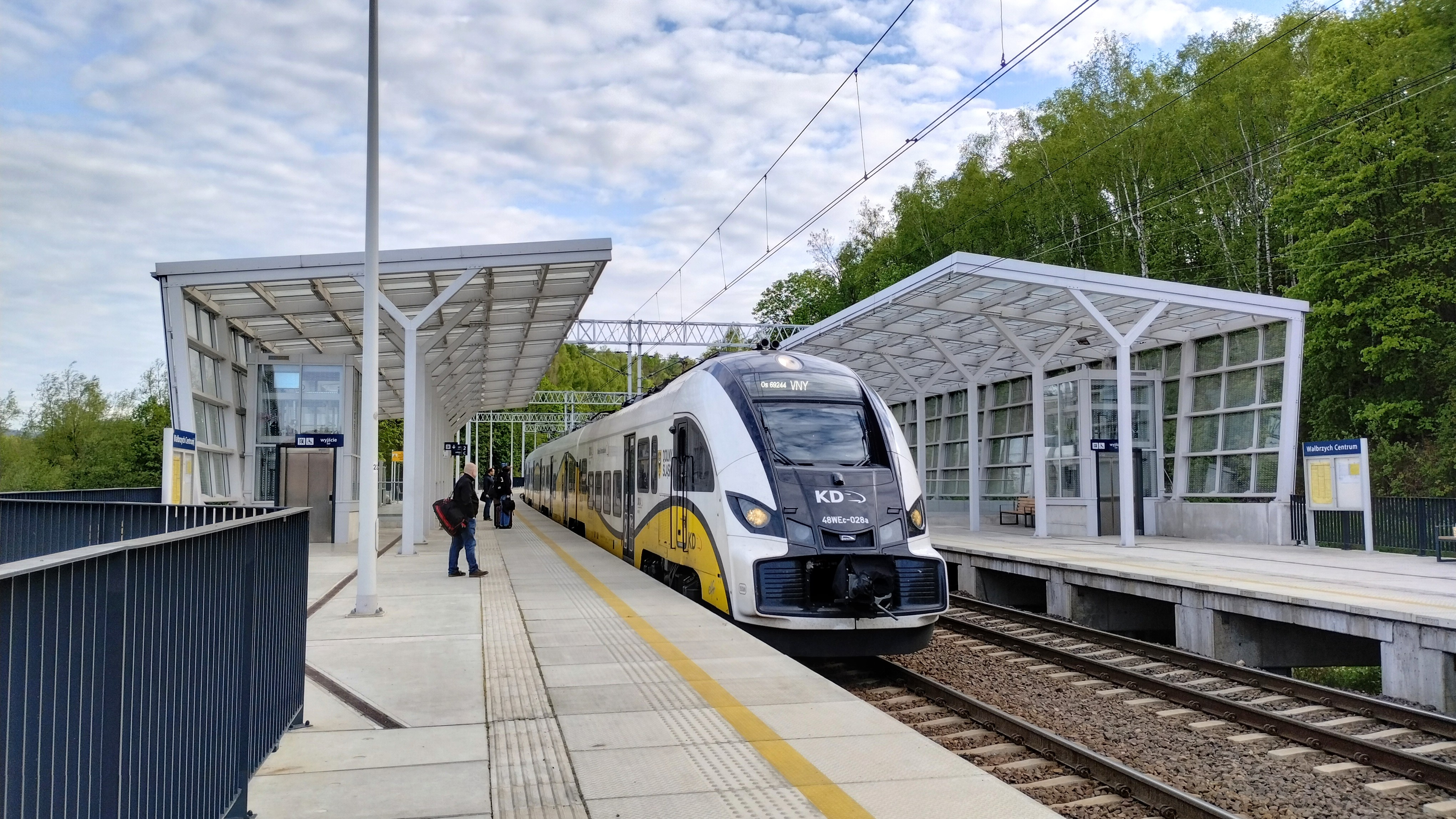
- Pesa Elf 48WEc at Wałbrzych Centrum
- Native name: Koleje Dolnośląskie
- Type: Spółka Akcyjna
- Industry: Rail transport
- Predecessor: Lower Silesian Regional Railways
- Founded: 28 December 2007; 18 years ago
- Headquarters: Legnica, Poland
- Area served: Lower Silesia
- Key people: Damian Stawikowski (president)
- Revenue: 1,932,303 PLN (2021)
- Owner: Lower Silesian Voivodship
- Number of employees: 1,080
- Website: www.kolejedolnoslaskie.pl

Lower Silesian Railways (Polish: Koleje Dolnośląśkie; KD) is a regional rail operator primarily serving the Lower Silesian Voivodeship of Poland. Founded in 2007, KD is fully owned by the Lower Silesian Voivodeship – it was the first Polish state-owned rail operator to not be owned by Polish State Railways.

Outside of the Lower Silesian Voivodeship, KD operates several routes, both regular and seasonal to Germany and the Czech Republic, sometimes jointly operated between Trilex (in Germany) and České dráhy (in the Czech Republic). KD also operates the Lower Silesian Agglomeration Railway, a commuter railway serving the Wrocław metropolitan area.

== Train categories ==
The only train category operated by KD is local passenger trains (Polish: osobowy).

Apart from KD's tickets, tickets issued by Polregio are accepted on board of KD trains.

== History ==
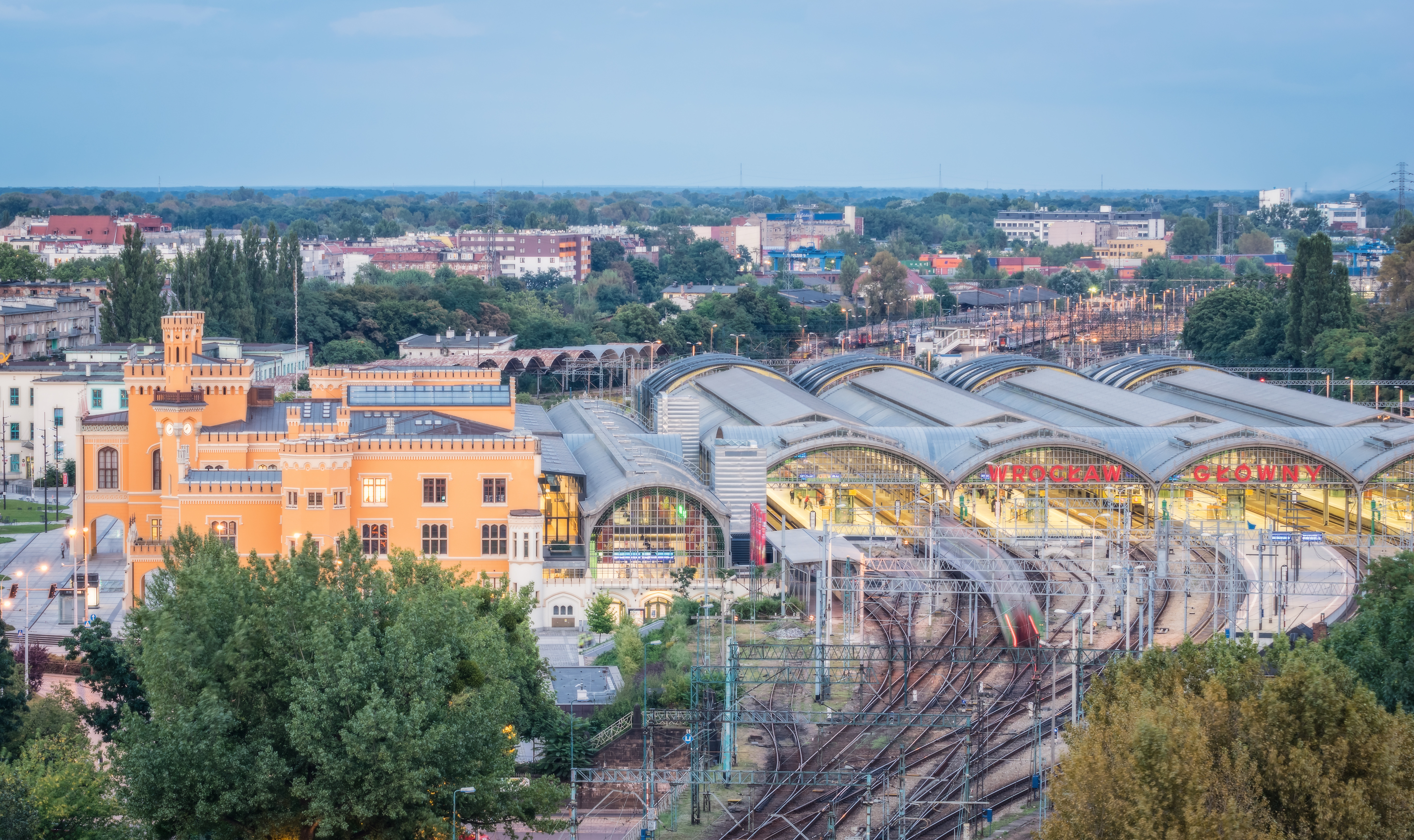
Wrocław Główny is the most served station by the operator

Following a decision of the Lower Silesian Voivodeship Sejmik, Lower Silesian Railways (KD) was founded on 28 December 2007. It formally commenced operations on 6 February 2008, after being registered into the National Court Register, however passenger services did not commence until late 2008. KD then began recruiting and training staff in June of the same year, were Arriva RP collaborated with the company with the training programme. Driver training was held at the Żmigród Test Track in cooperation with the Lower Silesian branch of Polregio.

In September 2008, KD applied to the Polish Office of Rail Transport for the authorisation to commence passenger services. Due to the long waiting process, KD began operating services on behalf of Dolnośląskie Linie Autobusowe, which allowed KD to commence passenger services earlier, but resulting in criticism from Polregio. After establishing a partnership with PKP Cargo, KD gained access to Legnica Depot, setting up headquarters there in the same city.

KD leased its first train on 8 December 2008, an SA106 unit 011 during the ceremony of the handover of Świdnica Miasto railway station from Polish State Railways (PKP) to the Lower Silesian Voivodeship. KD officially commenced its first regular passenger services on 14 December, first on the Katowice–Legnica railway, operating from Legnica to Międzylesie via Kłodzko Głowne. In the initial phase of its operations, KD adopted the transport tariff, carriage regulations, and ticket prices from Polregio. Tickets issued by Polregio where accepted on board KD trains, however KD-issued tickets where not accepted on board Polregio trains.

When KD began operation, it became Poland's first state-owned rail operator which wasn't owned by PKP, and fully by the Lower Silesian Voivodeship. Also in 2008, KD leased two type 102A Ryflaki carriages from Lower Silesian Regional Railways, a now defunct private railway company. Despite extensive retrofitting of the carriages in 2009, they never entered service and were instead stored at Miłkowice Depot.

On 14 June 2026, Bielawa Jezioro and Bielawa Góry Sowie railway stations opened, which KD began serving. Route D30 was introduced to Leszno, from Wrocław Główny. The seasonal service to Świnoujście was re-introduced, and another seasonal service, a dedicated cyclist train, the KD Sprinter Ryszard Szurkowski, began operating between Wrocław Główny and Milicz.

== Rolling stock ==
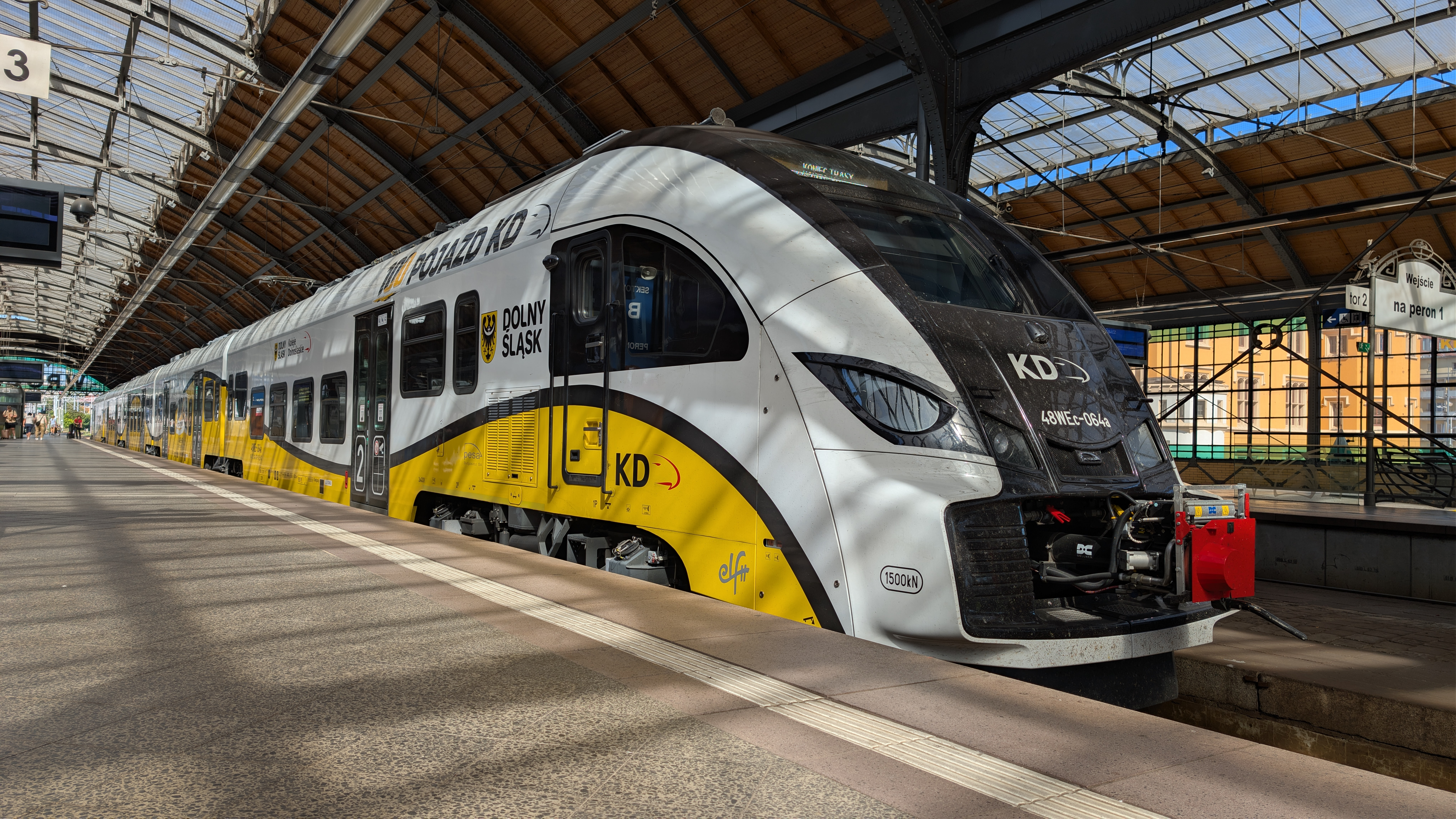
Unit 064 was the 100th train of KD's fleet, pictured at Wrocław Główny in August 2026.

At first, the rolling stock consisted of diesel units provided by the Lower Silesian voivodeship government which had previously been used by Przewozy Regionalne (now known as Polregio): one SA106, one SA132, three SA134 and three SA135 diesel multiple units. Additional Diesel units were purchased in 2010 (three SA135 vehicles), 2011 (three SA134 vehicles) and 2015 (modern Pesa Link units marked as SA139).

Lower Silesian Railways (KD) obtained their first electric multiple unit from Polregio in 2013 (it was an EN57AL which had been retrofitted the previous year). Three more EN57-class units were purchased and retrofitted at the cost of the Lower Silesian Voivodeship. The company also purchased completely new electric vehicles – the first Newag Impuls units (31WE) were ordered in 2011 in a batch of five. In 2014 the operator ordered six Impuls 36WEa units; the following year, they ordered five more 31WE units. One of the largest orders in KD's history was its purchase of eleven 45WE units in 2017, which, when the order was placed, were described as "the most well-equipped and comfortable trains in the country".

On 30 June 2026, the 37th Pesa Elf 48WEc was delivered to KD. Unit 064 was the one-hundredth train to enter service in KD, subsequently receiving its own livery in commemoration of the achievement. This is one of the Elfs ordered in the August 2024 contract; in the future the total number of Elfs on KD will be 55. This is the largest rolling stock order in KD's history.

The company uses the following rolling stock:

Class	Picture	Cars per set	Type	Top speed		Number in service	Builder(s)	Built / refurbished
Class	Picture	Cars per set	Type	km/h	mph	Number in service	Builder(s)	Built / refurbished
SA106		1	DMU	120	75	1	Pesa	2005
SA109		2	DMU	120	75	2	Kolzam	2005
SA132		2	DMU	120	75	1	Pesa	2006
SA134		2	DMU	120	75	8	Pesa, ZNTK Mińsk Mazowiecki	2008, 2011
SA135		1	DMU	120	75	9	Pesa, ZNTK Mińsk Mazowiecki	2008, 2010–2011
SA139		2	DMU	120	75	4	Pesa	2015
EN57		3	EMU	110	68	1	Pafawag, ZNTK Mińsk Mazowiecki	1988 / 2016
EN57AL		3	EMU	110	68	3	Pafawag, ZNTK Mińsk Mazowiecki	1982–1992 / 2012–2015
EN57AKD		3	EMU	110	68	1	Pafawag, ZNTK Mińsk Mazowiecki	1991 / 2013
31WE		4	EMU	160	99	10	Newag	2013–2015
36WEa		3	EMU	160	99	6	Newag	2014
36WEh		3	BMU	160	100	6	Newag	2021–2022
45WE		5	EMU	160	99	11	Newag	2017
48WEc		5	EMU	160	99	45 (out of 55)	Pesa	2022–present

== Routes ==
As of the 30 August 2026 timetable.

=== Trains ===
- D1 Wrocław Główny – Legnica – Bolesławiec – Lubań Śląski
- D2 / D20 Wrocław Główny – Ścinawa – Głogów – Nowa Sól – Zielona Góra
- D3 Wrocław Główny – Żmigród – Rawicz
- D30 Wrocław Główny – Żmigród – Rawicz – Leszno
- D4 Wrocław Główny – Sobótka – Świdnica – Bielawa Góry Sowie
- D6 Wrocław Główny – Wałbrzych – Jelenia Góra
- D7 Wrocław Główny – Siechnice – Jelcz-Laskowice
- D71 Wrocław Główny – Siechnice – Jelcz-Laskowice – Biskupice Oławskie
- D8 Wrocław Główny – Trzebnica
- D9 Wrocław Główny – Kłodzko – Lichkov
- D10 Wrocław Główny – Legnica – Zgorzelec – Görlitz
- D11 / D12 Wrocław Główny – Legnica – Lubin – Głogów
- D13 Legnica – Chojnów – Chocianów
- D14 Wrocław Główny – Legnica – Żary – Forst (Lausitz)
- D40 Wrocław Główny – Jaworzyna Śląska – Świdnica – Bielawa Góry Sowie
- D60 Wrocław Główny – Wałbrzych – Jelenia Góra – Szklarska Poręba
- D61 Szklarska Poręba – Harrachov – Liberec
- D62 Karpacz / Świeradów-Zdrój – Jelenia Góra – Görlitz
- D64 Wrocław Główny – Jaworzyna Śląska – Świdnica – Głuszyca
- D66 Sędzisław – Královec – Trutnov
- D70 Wrocław Główny – Dobrzykowice – Jelcz-Laskowice
- D80 Wrocław Główny – Oleśnica – Namysłów
- D83 Wrocław Główny – Oleśnica – Milicz – Krotoszyn
- D90 Wrocław Główny – Kłodzko – Kudowa-Zdrój
- D91 Legnica – Świdnica – Kłodzko
- D96 Wałbrzych – Kłodzko Główne – Kudowa-Zdrój

=== Buses ===
- D31 Rawicz – Góra
- D81 Oleśnica – Syców
- D92 Kłodzko – Lądek-Zdrój – Stronie Śląskie

=== Route map ===
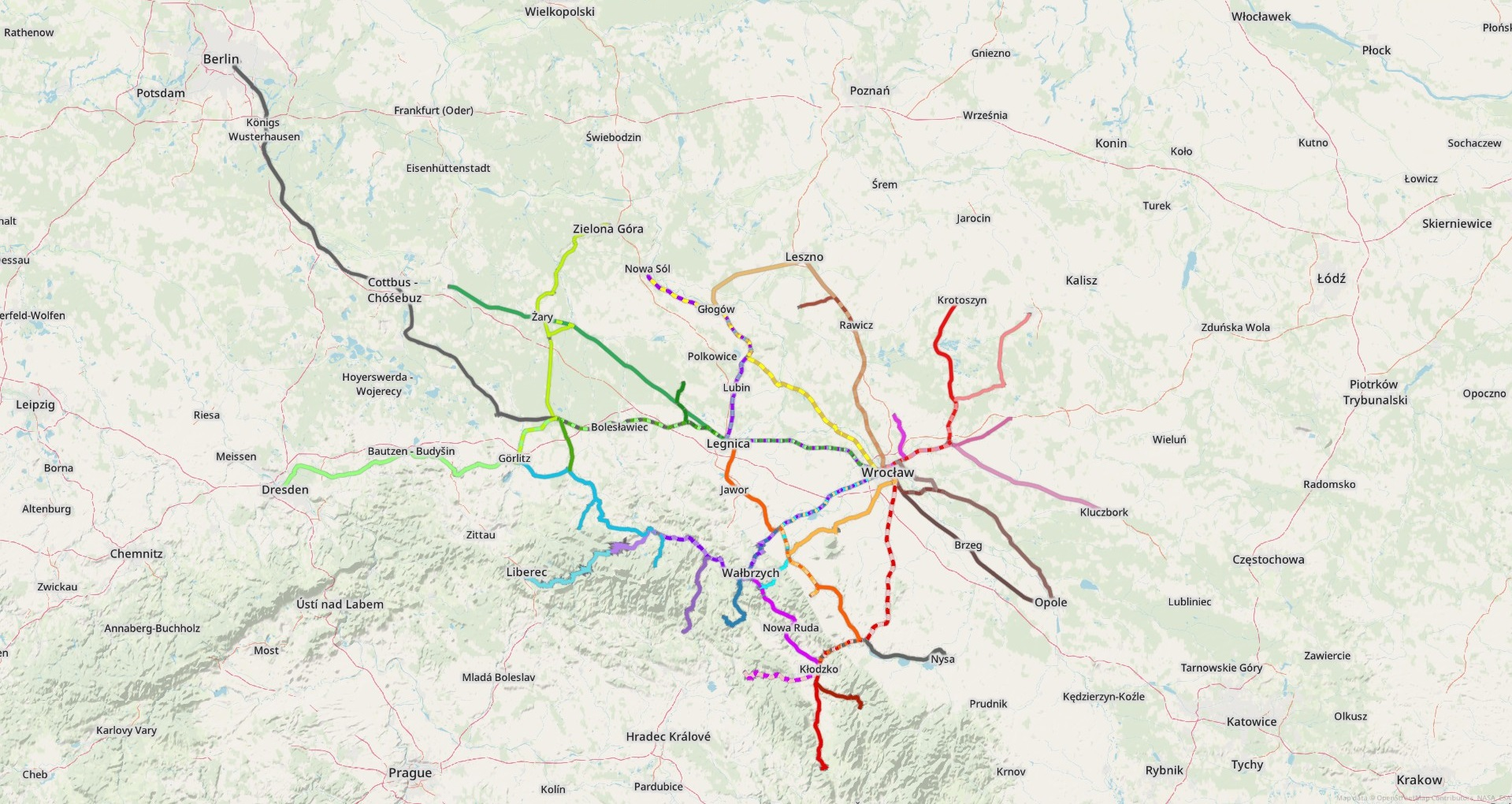
Route map as of December 2023

== See also ==
- Acquisition of railways by the Lower Silesian Voivodeship
- Lower Silesian Agglomeration Railway
- Lower Silesian Regional Railways
