= 2026 in Poland =

- Decades: 2000s; 2010s; 2020s
- See also: Other events of 2026; Timeline of Polish history

Events in the year 2026 in Poland.

== Incumbents ==
Incumbents
Position	Person	Party
President	Karol Nawrocki	Independent (Supported by Law and Justice)
Prime Minister	Donald Tusk	Civic Coalition
Marshal of the Sejm	Włodzimierz Czarzasty	The Left
Marshal of the Senate	Małgorzata Kidawa-Błońska	Civic Coalition

== Events ==
=== January ===
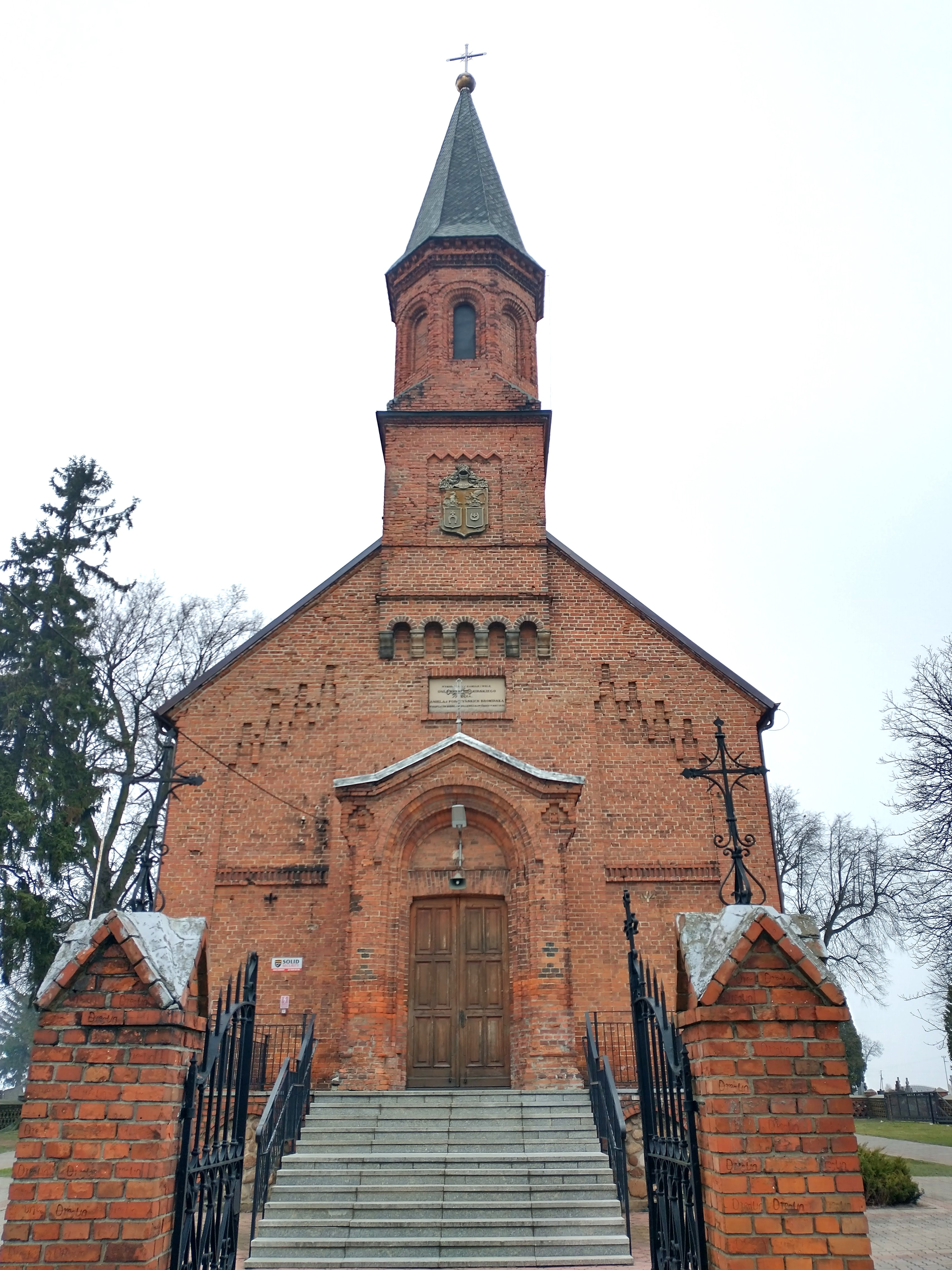
Catholic church in Staroźreby in 2024

- 1 January – Six localities obtain town rights: Branice, Janów, Janów Podlaski, Małkinia Górna, Stanisławów, and Staroźreby.
- 3 January – Polish language reform, the largest spelling reform in 90 years
- 9–11 January – 2026 European Speed Skating Championships held in Tomaszów Mazowiecki.
- 12 January – Hungary grants asylum to former Polish justice minister Zbigniew Ziobro, who is wanted on charges of corruption.
- 21 January – A magnitude 3.5 earthquake hits the Lower Silesian Voivodeship, injuring two people at the Lubin mine.

=== February ===
- 3 February – A resident of Hrubieszów is sentenced to 3.5 years' imprisonment for spying as part of a Russian plot to assassinate Ukrainian president Volodymyr Zelenskyy in 2024.
- 5 February – The United States severs official contact with the Marshal of the Sejm, Włodzimierz Czarzasty, citing his comments against US president Donald Trump.
- 18 February –
  - Bishop Andrzej Jeż of Tarnow becomes the first bishop in Poland to be tried on charges of failing to inform authorities about alleged sexual abuse of children by two priests in his diocese.
  - The Polish Land Forces bars the entry of Chinese-made vehicles to its premises due to espionage concerns.
- 19 February – President Nawrocki signs a law lifting special support measures for Ukrainian refugees.
- 20 February – Poland formally withdraws from the Ottawa Treaty.
- 20–22 February – 2026 Women's EuroHockey Indoor Club Cup held in Zalasewo.

=== March ===
- 6 March – Poland boycotts the opening ceremony of the 2026 Winter Paralympics in Italy in protest over Russian athletes being allowed to compete under the Russian flag after the lifting of sanctions imposed over the Russian invasion of Ukraine in 2022.
- 7 March – Law and Justice (PiS) hold an convention in Kraków, where Przemysław Czarnek was named as the party's candidate for the office of Prime Minister for the Next Polish parliamentary election.
- 12 March – President Nawrocki vetoes the EU-sponsored Security Action For Europe (SAFE) scheme that would have raised nearly 44 billion euros in loans to improve defense capabilities, citing issues of national sovereignty.
- 18 March – A court in Warsaw approves the extradition of Russian archaeologist Alexander Butyagin to Ukraine, where he is wanted on charges of damaging the Myrmēkion site in Russian-occupied Crimea.
- 20 March – Defence minister Władysław Kosiniak-Kamysz announces the withdrawal of Polish forces from Iraq, stationed there as part of the CJTF–OIR joint task force against the Islamic State, citing the regional threat from Iran.
- 20 – 22 March – The 21st World Athletics Indoor Championships are held at the Kujawsko-Pomorska Arena Toruń in Toruń, Kuyavian–Pomeranian Voivodeship.

=== April ===
- 7 April – GKS Tychy win their seventh Polish Ice Hockey Championship, defeating GKS Katowice in the finals.
- 9 April – A magnitude 2.7 earthquake hits the Silesian Voivodeship, injuring three miners near Rydułtowy.
- 28 April – Three Polish nationals held by Belarus are released at the border with Poland following a prisoner exchange facilitated by the United States.

=== May ===
- 10 May
  - Warta Zawiercie win their first Polish Volleyball Championship, defeating Bogdanka LUK Lublin in the finals (see 2025–26 PlusLiga).
  - Former justice minister Zbigniew Ziobro, who had been in hiding in Hungary to avoid charges of misusing public funds and spying on political opponents in Poland, flees to the United States.
- 14 May – The city of Warsaw registers its first same sex marriage.
- 16 May
  - Lech Poznań win their tenth Polish Football Championship (see 2025–26 Ekstraklasa).
  - Poland's Alicja Szemplińska finishes 12th at Eurovision 2026 in Austria with the single "Pray".
- 31 May – Industria Kielce win their 21st Polish Handball Championship, defeating Wisła Płock in the finals (see 2025–26 Superliga).

=== June ===
- 1 – 7 June – Basketball 2026 FIBA 3x3 World Cup at Palace of Culture and Science in Warsaw
- 6 June – Tennis player Maja Chwalińska reaches the final of the 2026 French Open – Women's singles, the first qualifier to achieve the feat at the event. Chwalińska becomes second qualifier in the Open Era to reach a major final, after Emma Raducanu at the 2021 US Open.
- 14 June – Two brand new railway stations; Bielawa Jezioro and Bielawa Góry Sowie, open in the Lower Silesian Voivodeship.
- 15 June – Semyon Skrepetsky, a dissident Russian artist living in exile in Poland since 2021, is shot dead in Biała Podlaska.
- 17 June
  - A magnitude 2.6 earthquake hits the Silesian Voivodeship, killing one person in a mine near Bytom.
  - Germany and Poland sign a defense cooperation agreement.
  - The medieval manuscript of Gaude Mater Polonia, a ring of Polish King Sigismund the Old, and a collection of miniature model trains from a pre-war museum in Warsaw, all looted by Germany from Poland during World War II, are repatriated by Germany.
- 19 June – President Nawrocki strips Ukrainian president Volodymyr Zelenskyy of the Order of the White Eagle, Poland's highest state honour, after Zelenskyy honored a special operations forces unit with the name "Heroes of the Ukrainian Insurgent Army", a Nazi-collaborating organization that conducted a genocide against Poles in Volhynia and Eastern Galicia.
- 20 June – Pogoń Siedlce win their second Polish Rugby Championship, defeating Ogniwo Sopot in the final.
- 21 June – Legia Warsaw win their ninth Polish Basketball Championship, defeating Zastal Zielona Góra in the finals (see 2025–26 PLK season).
- 25 June – Eleven people are injured after two passenger trains collide in Białośliwie, Piła County.
- 27 June – Informal summit held in Jurata, attended by president Nawrocki, Estonian president Alar Karis, Latvian president Edgars Rinkēvičs, Lithuanian president Gitanas Nausėda and Romanian president Nicușor Dan, with talks focusing on cooperation on NATO's eastern flank.
- 28 June
  - Ceremony marking the 70th anniversary of the outbreak of the anti-communist 1956 Poznań protests held in Poznań, attended by president Nawrocki, Hungarian president Tamás Sulyok, Latvian president Edgars Rinkēvičs and Albanian president Bajram Begaj, with a joint statement signed by the four Presidents.
  - 2026 European heatwaves: The highest recorded temperature in Poland is taken in Słubice, measuring 40.5 °C (104.9 °F).

=== July ===
- 11 July – A magnitude 4.9 earthquake hits the Lower Silesian Voivodeship, injuring one person at a mine near Lubin.
- 18 July – A magnitude 3.5 earthquake hits the Lower Silesian Voivodeship, injuring two people at a mine near Rudna.
- 24 July – Mateusz Morawiecki and his political association, Development Plus, are expelled from the PiS after refusing the party leadership's demand to dissolve the association and sign a loyalty oath prohibiting membership in any political movements besides PiS.
- 27 July – The modernist city center of Gdynia is designated as a UNESCO World Heritage Site.
- 30 July – A suspected Russian cruise missile lands in Tarnawa-Kolonia near Lublin.

=== August ===
- 2 August
  - Poland wins the 2026 FIVB Men's Volleyball Nations League, defeating the United States 3–2 in Ningbo, China. They secure a record third title.
  - Bartłomiej Kubkowski becomes the first person to swim across the Baltic Sea, after swimming for 56 hours at a distance of 160 km (99 mi) from Kåseberga, Sweden to Dziwnów, Poland.
- 3 August – The Polish health ministry appeals a court ruling in Belgium that ordered Poland to accept and pay approximately €1.3 billion for unwanted COVID-19 vaccine doses produced by Pfizer and BioNTech.
- 4 August – The Polish military intercepts a Russian Ilyushin Il-20M reconnaissance aircraft about 56 km (35 mi) north-west of Koszalin.
- 15 August – The tallest statue of the Virgin Mary in Europe, measuring 55.6 m (182 ft), is unveiled in Konotopie.
- 29 August – 2026 Speedway World Cup at Stadion Narodowy in Warsaw.

=== September ===
- 5–27 September – 2026 FIFA U-20 Women's World Cup.
- 8 September
  - Poland sanctions products from Israeli settlements in the West Bank. (Note: However, Poland clarified that settlement trade restrictions are contingent on EU action.)
  - Andrzej Poczobut, a formerly jailed activist for the Polish minority in Belarus who was released in April in a prisoner exchange with Poland, returns to Belarus.
- 9 September – A PKP Intercity train derails in Sokolniki Suche after a cement mixer lorry collides into the side of the train, killing one and injuring 20.
- 15 September – The European Parliament lifts the legal immunity of extreme right-wing Polish deputy Grzegorz Braun.
- 23 September –
  - A Russian military helicopter briefly enters Polish airspace from Kaliningrad Oblast north of Braniewo.
  - A fire blamed on a Russian sabotage operation breaks out at a state-owned Starlink satellite station in Wola Krobowska.
- 24 September – A Ukrainian national is arrested following a knife attack on an abbey in Jarosław that leaves a priest dead and four injured.
- 26 September – Poland wins the 2026 Men's European Volleyball Championship defeating France 1–3 in Milan, securing their 3rd title.

=== October ===
- 4 October – KS Toruń wins their sixth Team Speedway Polish Championship, defeating Sparta Wrocław in the finals (see 2026 Polish speedway season).
- 5 October – Tadeusz Lutak dies aged 109, having been the last known living soldier who fought during the Invasion of Poland, and the last soldier who fought in 1939.
- 7 October – Ten people, including the 19-year-old attacker, are injured in a school attack in Ostrołęka.
- 8 October – A teenager kills one person and injures two others at a primary school in Leszczydół-Nowiny.
- 10 October – A 21-year-old student carries out a stabbing attack at a college in Warsaw, injuring three people.
- 16 October – A 31-year-old man of Polish and Ukrainian citizenship is arrested in Łódź on suspicion of spying.
- 30 October – Suspension of Bogdan Święczkowski

=== November ===
- 3 November – A passenger aircraft traveling from London to Warsaw Chopin Airport is diverted to Warsaw Modlin Airport after it is subjected to a bomb threat that was subsequently found to be false.
- 5 November – An LOT flight from Warsaw to Paris is searched before takeoff after being subjected to bomb threats that are subsequently found to be false.
- 7 November – Kraków shooting: 24-year old gunman, Michał O., opens fire in the Main Square, Kraków, killing six people and injuring over fifteen more.
- 20 November – Suspected Russian missiles and drones crash in separate incidents in Nowy Lipowiec, Rudnik nad Sanem and Mołodycz.

=== Predicted and scheduled events ===
- 13 December – Scheduled opening of Bydgoszcz Stary Fordon railway station in Bydgoszcz.
- 3–20 December – 2026 European Women's Handball Championship in Czech Republic, Poland, Romania, Slovakia and Turkey.

== Holidays ==
- 1 January – New Year's Day
- 6 January – Epiphany
- 5 April – Easter Sunday
- 6 April – Easter Monday
- 1 May – May Day

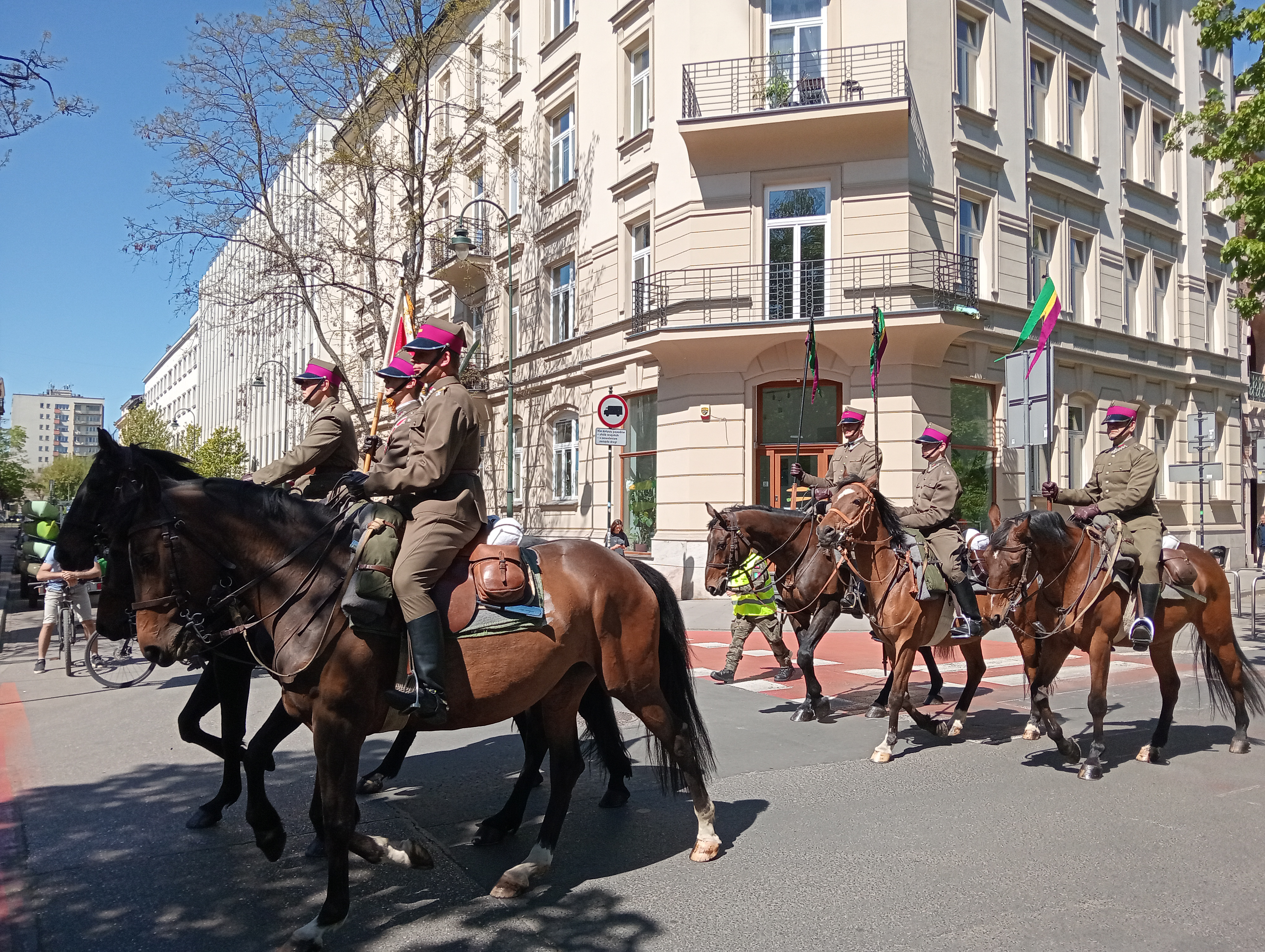
2026 3 May Constitution Day in Kraków

- 3 May – 3 May Constitution Day
- 24 May – Whit Sunday
- 4 June – Corpus Christi
- 15 August – Assumption Day
- 1 November – All Saints' Day
- 11 November – Independence Day
- 24 December – Christmas Eve
- 25 December – Christmas Day
- 26 December – 2nd Day of Christmas

== Art and entertainment ==
- List of Polish submissions for the Academy Award for Best International Feature Film

== Deaths ==
- 2 January –
  - Robert Wolski, 43, Olympic high jumper (2004)
  - Anna Kurek, 96, nurse and Warsaw Uprising participant.
- 3 January –
  - Andrzej Paczkowski, 87, historian
  - Mirosław Zdanowicz, 88, social activist.
- 4 January – Teresa Zalewska, 87, MP (1989–1991)
- 21 February – Mirosław Krawczyk, 72, actor (Disco Polo).
- 1 March – Andrzej Gąsienica-Józkowy, 79–80, mountain rescuer.
- 15 March –
  - Eugeniusz Wyzner, 94, politician.
  - Mariusz Wideryński, 74–75, photographer.
- 16 March – Marek Trombski, 88, politician and scientist.
- 20 March – Aleksandra Kurczab-Pomianowska, 85, actress and translator. (death announced on this date)
- 23 April – Łukasz Litewka, 36, sociologist, MP (since 2023)
- 8 June – Helmut Nadolski, 83, musician.
- 4 July – Grzegorz Miętus, 33, ski jumper.
- 25 July – Józef Hulka, 100, sculptor.
- 27 July – Anna Knysok, 75, politician, MP (1989–1993).
- 24 August – Mirosław Różański, 63, senator (since 2023), and lieutenant general.
- 5 October – Tadeusz Lutak, 109, World War II veteran.
- 29 October – Paweł Socha, 91, Roman Catholic prelate, titular bishop of Thunigaba (since 1973) and auxiliary bishop of Zielona Góra-Gorzów (1973–2012)
- 18 November – Tadeusz Wojciechowski, 101, economist, academic and participant in the Warsaw Uprising
