= Zajeziorze, Gmina Kikół =

Zajeziorze
- Village
- Location within Poland
- Coordinates: 52°57′20″N 19°07′58″E
- Country: Poland
- Voivodeship: Kuyavian-Pomeranian
- County: Lipno
- Gmina: Kikół

Zajeziorze [zajɛˈʑɔʐɛ] is a village in the administrative district of Gmina Kikół, within Lipno County, Kuyavian-Pomeranian Voivodeship, in north-central Poland.
