= Niedźwiedź, Lipno County =

Niedźwiedź
- Village
- Location within Poland
- Coordinates: 52°57′N 19°2′E
- Country: Poland
- Voivodeship: Kuyavian-Pomeranian
- County: Lipno
- Gmina: Kikół

Niedźwiedź [ˈɲɛd͡ʑvjɛt͡ɕ] is a village in the administrative district of Gmina Kikół, within Lipno County, Kuyavian-Pomeranian Voivodeship, in north-central Poland.
