= Hornówek, Kuyavian-Pomeranian Voivodeship =

Hornówek
- Village
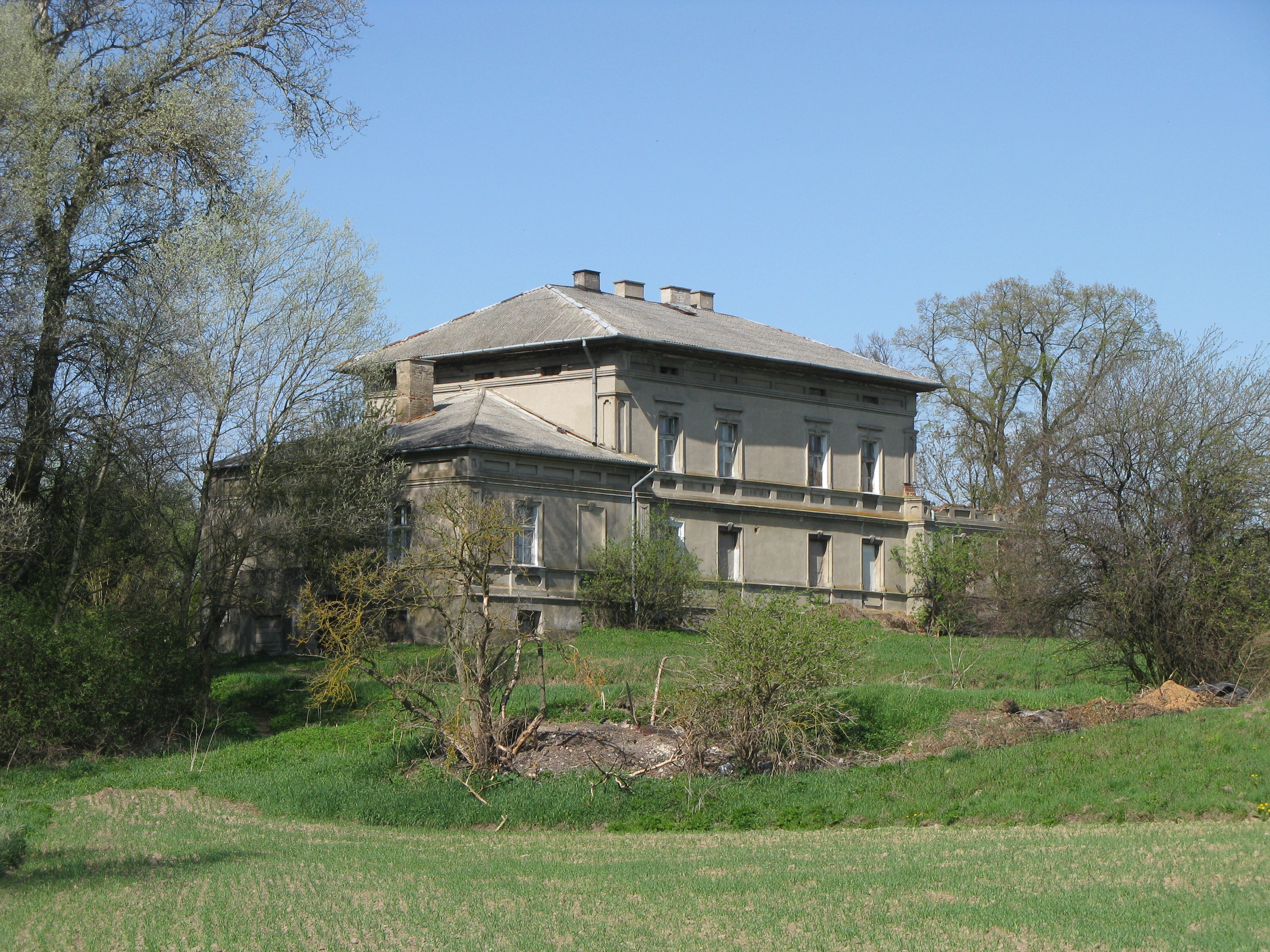

- Location within Poland
- Coordinates: 52°57′38″N 19°1′43″E
- Country: Poland
- Voivodeship: Kuyavian-Pomeranian
- County: Lipno
- Gmina: Kikół

Hornówek [xɔrˈnuvɛk] is a village in the administrative district of Gmina Kikół, within Lipno County, Kuyavian-Pomeranian Voivodeship, in north-central Poland.
