= Dąbrówka, Lipno County =

Dąbrówka
- Village
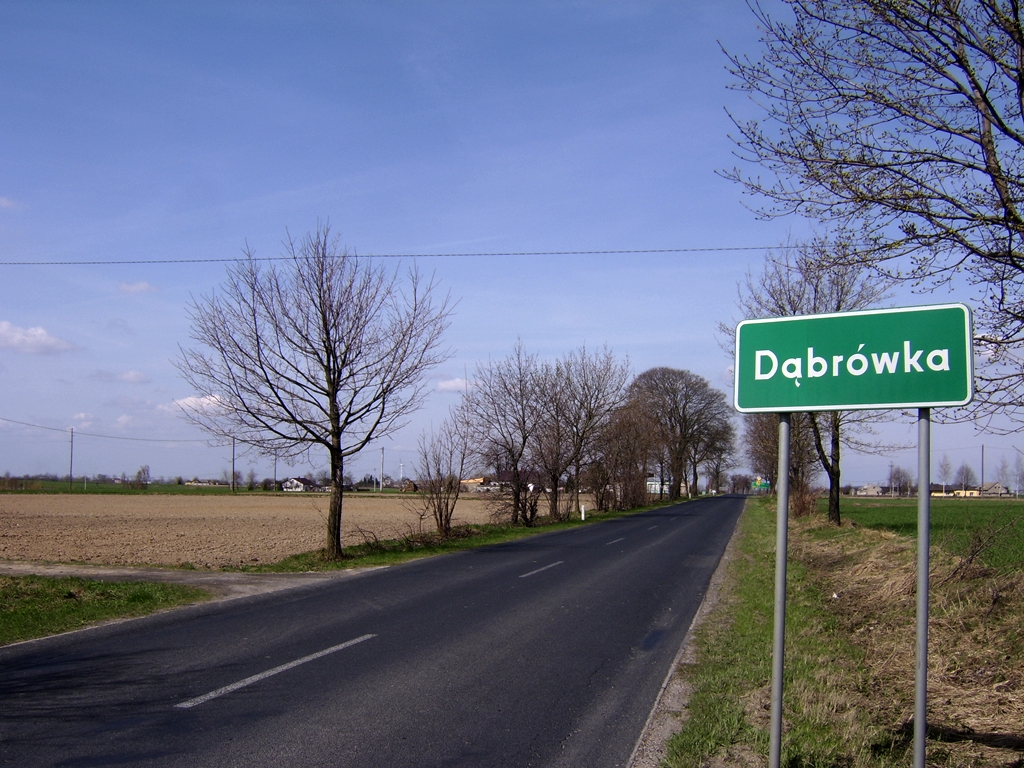
- Road sign in Dąbrówka

- Location within Poland
- Coordinates: 52°57′39″N 19°05′49″E
- Country: Poland
- Voivodeship: Kuyavian-Pomeranian
- County: Lipno
- Gmina: Kikół

Dąbrówka [dɔmˈbrufka] is a village in the administrative district of Gmina Kikół, within Lipno County, Kuyavian-Pomeranian Voivodeship, in north-central Poland.
