= Gmina Kikół =

Gmina Kikół Kikół Commune
- Gmina
- Coat of arms
- Interactive map of Gmina Kikół
- Coordinates (Kikół): 52°55′0″N 19°7′0″E
- Country: Poland
- Voivodeship: Kuyavian-Pomeranian
- County: Lipno
- Seat: Kikół

Area
  - Total: 98.2 km^{2} (37.9 sq mi)

Population (2006)
  - Total: 7,223
  - Density: 73.6/km^{2} (191/sq mi)
- Website: http://kikol.pl

Gmina Kikół is a rural gmina (administrative district) in Lipno County, Kuyavian-Pomeranian Voivodeship, in north-central Poland. Its seat is the town of Kikół, which lies approximately 9 kilometres (6 mi) north-west of Lipno and 36 km (22 mi) east of Toruń.

The gmina covers an area of 98.2 square kilometres (37.9 sq mi), and as of 2006 its total population is 7,223.

== Villages ==
Gmina Kikół contains the villages and settlements of Ciełuchowo, Dąbrówka, Grodzeń, Hornówek, Janowo, Jarczechowo, Kikół-Wieś, Kołat-Rybniki, Konotopie, Lubin, Moszczonne, Niedźwiedź, Sumin, Trutowo, Walentowo, Wawrzonkowo, Wola, Wolęcin, Wymyślin and Zajeziorze.

== Neighbouring gminas ==
Gmina Kikół is bordered by the gminas of Chrostkowo, Czernikowo, Lipno and Zbójno.
