= Trutowo =

- Village
- Location within Poland
- Coordinates: 52°58′N 19°3′E
- Country: Poland
- Voivodeship: Kuyavian-Pomeranian
- County: Lipno
- Gmina: Kikół
- Population: 140

Trutowo [truˈtɔvɔ] is a village in the administrative district of Gmina Kikół, within Lipno County, Kuyavian-Pomeranian Voivodeship, in north-central Poland.
