= Wawrzonkowo =

- Village
- Location within Poland
- Coordinates: 52°55′36″N 19°02′29″E
- Country: Poland
- Voivodeship: Kuyavian-Pomeranian
- County: Lipno
- Gmina: Kikół

Wawrzonkowo [vavʐɔŋˈkɔvɔ] is a village in the administrative district of Gmina Kikół, within Lipno County, Kuyavian-Pomeranian Voivodeship, in north-central Poland.
