= Lubin, Kuyavian-Pomeranian Voivodeship =

Lubin
- Village
- Location within Poland
- Coordinates: 52°56′N 19°5′E
- Country: Poland
- Voivodeship: Kuyavian-Pomeranian
- County: Lipno
- Gmina: Kikół
- Time zone: UTC+1 (CET)
  - Summer (DST): UTC+2 (CEST)
- Vehicle registration: CLI

Lubin (Polish: [ˈlubin]) is a village in the administrative district of Gmina Kikół, within Lipno County, Kuyavian-Pomeranian Voivodeship, in north-central Poland.

== History ==
In 1329, the village was granted by Duke Władysław the Hunchback, nephew of Polish King Władysław I Łokietek, to chamberlain Paweł, and granted Chełmno law.

During the German occupation of Poland (World War II), Poles from Lubin were among the victims of large massacres of Poles from the county carried out by the Germans in nearby Karnkowo as part of the Intelligenzaktion.
