= Wola, Lipno County =

Village in Poland

Wola
- Village
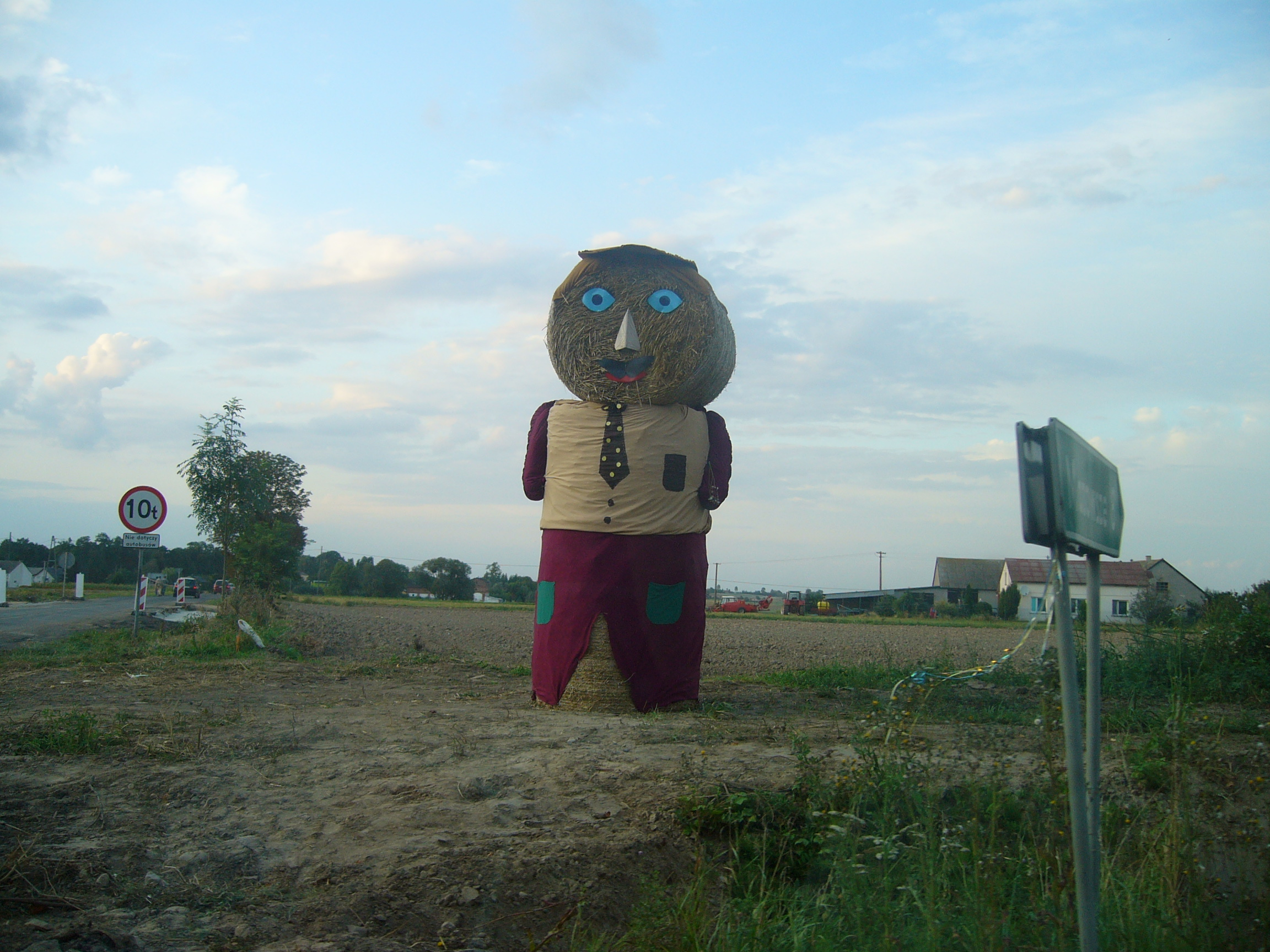

- Location within Poland
- Coordinates: 52°57′N 19°4′E
- Country: Poland
- Voivodeship: Kuyavian-Pomeranian
- County: Lipno
- Gmina: Kikół
- SIMC: 0863681

Wola [ˈvɔla] is a village in the administrative district of Gmina Kikół, within Lipno County, Kuyavian-Pomeranian Voivodeship, in north-central Poland.
