= Wymyślin =

- Village
- Location within Poland
- Coordinates: 52°57′30″N 19°4′48″E
- Country: Poland
- Voivodeship: Kuyavian-Pomeranian
- County: Lipno
- Gmina: Kikół
- Population: 92

Wymyślin [vɨˈmɨɕlin] is a village in the administrative district of Gmina Kikół, within Lipno County, Kuyavian-Pomeranian Voivodeship, in north-central Poland.
