= Sumin, Lipno County =

Sumin
- Village
- Location within Poland
- Coordinates: 52°54′36″N 19°05′14″E
- Country: Poland
- Voivodeship: Kuyavian-Pomeranian
- County: Lipno
- Gmina: Kikół

Sumin [ˈsumin] is a village in the administrative district of Gmina Kikół, within Lipno County, Kuyavian-Pomeranian Voivodeship, in north-central Poland.
