= Bielawa Zachodnia railway station =

Railway station in Bielawa, Poland

Bielawa Zachodnia Bielawa West
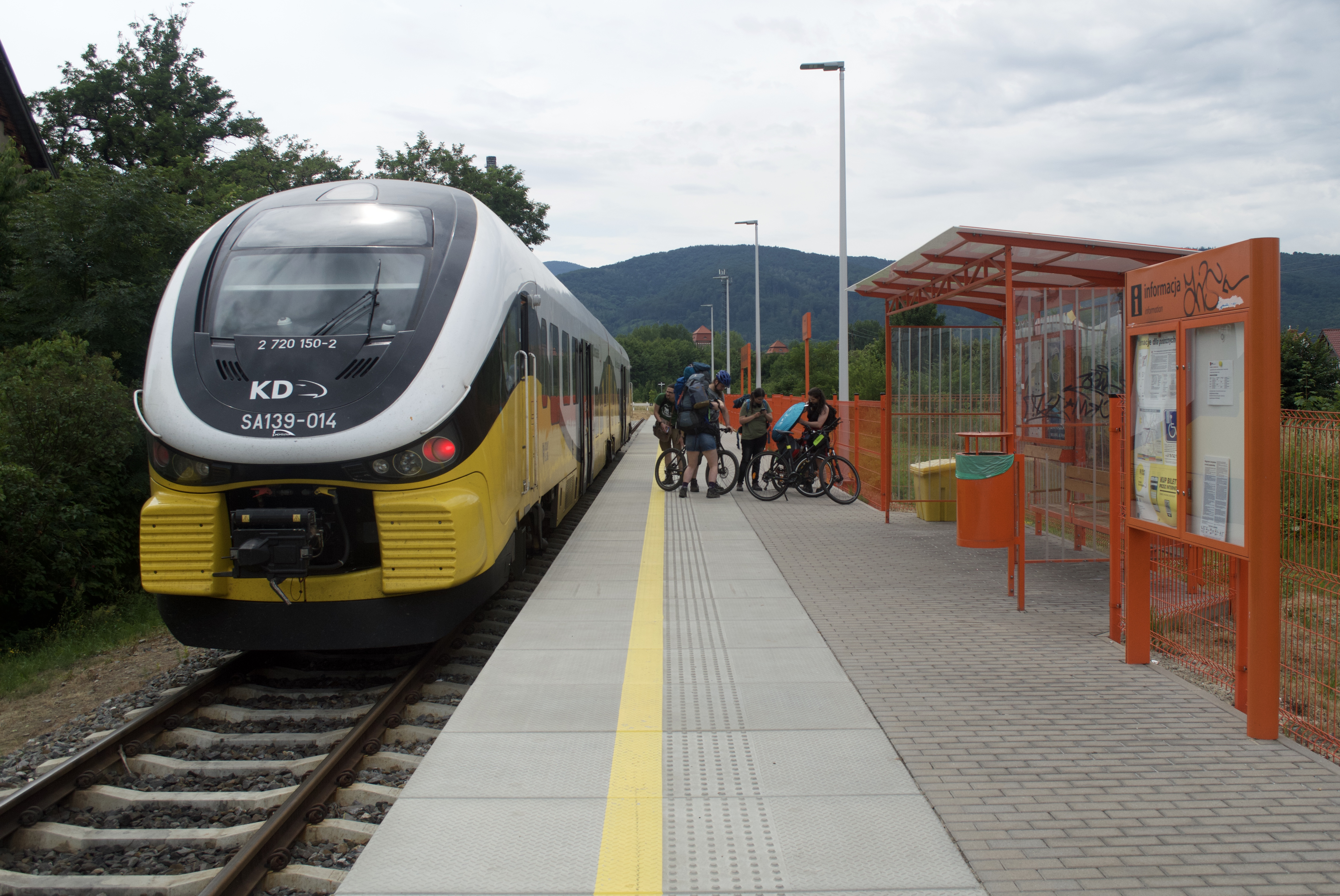
- Lower Silesian Railways Pesa Link SA139 at Bielawa Zachodnia in July 2022

General information
- Location: Bielawa, Lower Silesian Voivodeship; Poland
- Coordinates: 50°41′10.0″N 16°36′26.0″E
- Owner: Lower Silesian Road and Railway Authority in Wrocław
- Line: Dzierżoniów Śląski–Bielawa Góry Sowie
- Platforms: 1

History
- Opened: 14 June 2026
- Former names: Bielawa Camping Sudety (2024–2026)

Services
Preceding station	KD	Following station
Bielawa Centralna towards Wrocław Główny	D4	Bielawa Jezioro towards Bielawa Góry Sowie
Bielawa Centralna towards Wrocław Główny	D40	Bielawa Jezioro towards Bielawa Góry Sowie
Location
- Location within Poland Location within Lower Silesian Voivodeship

Bielawa Zachodnia (pl; lit. 'Bielawa West') is a railway station on the Dzierżoniów Śląski–Bielawa Góry Sowie railway in the town of Bielawa, Dzierżoniów County within the Lower Silesian Voivodeship in south-western Poland.

== History ==
The original station was opened by Prussian State Railways as Ober Langebielau on 25 May 1891, it contained three platforms and a station building. In 1900, Bielawa Zachodnia Dworzec Mały, a narrow-gauge railway station opened directly adjacent to the station. Ober Langebielau was renamed to Langebielau Oberstadt in 1914. After World War II, the area came under Polish administration. As a result, the station was taken over by Polish State Railways, and was renamed to Biała Długa. It was renamed in 1946 to Bielawa Długa, and eventually to its modern name, Bielawa Zachodnia, in 1947.

Passenger services were withdrawn from Bielawa Zachodnia on 21 May 1977. Freight trains continued to use the station when it was downgraded to a goods yard, until the line fully, which included Bielawa Zachodnia, closed on 17 August 2001.

=== Revitalisation and reopening ===
On 22 March 2019, after the line was taken over by the Lower Silesian Voivodeship, it signed a contract with PKP Polskie Linie Kolejowe for the revitalisation of Bielawa Zachodnia. The first test runs took place on 25 October, with the station opening to passenger services as part of the train timetable change on 15 December 2019, served by Lower Silesian Railways (KD). Bielawa Zachodnia was downgraded to a railway halt, as the new platforms were built disconnected from the original station building, which is now no longer part of the station itself.

In June 2026, the line was extended to serve two new stations: Bielawa Jezioro and Bielawa Góry Sowie, also both served by KD.

== Train services ==
The station is served by the following services:

- Regional services (KD) Wrocław - Jaworzyna Śląska - Świdnica - Bielawa Góry Sowie

== See also ==
- Acquisition of railways by the Lower Silesian Voivodeship
- Bielawa Góry Sowie railway station
