= Janowo, Lipno County =

Janowo
- Village
- Location within Poland
- Coordinates: 52°55′N 19°12′E
- Country: Poland
- Voivodeship: Kuyavian-Pomeranian
- County: Lipno
- Gmina: Kikół

Janowo [jaˈnɔvɔ] is a village in the administrative district of Gmina Kikół, within Lipno County, Kuyavian-Pomeranian Voivodeship, in north-central Poland.
