= Wolęcin, Kuyavian-Pomeranian Voivodeship =

Wolęcin
- Village
- Location within Poland
- Coordinates: 52°54′N 19°11′E
- Country: Poland
- Voivodeship: Kuyavian-Pomeranian
- County: Lipno
- Gmina: Kikół

Wolęcin [vɔˈlɛnt͡ɕin] is a village in the administrative district of Gmina Kikół, within Lipno County, Kuyavian-Pomeranian Voivodeship, in north-central Poland.
