= Kikół =

- Town
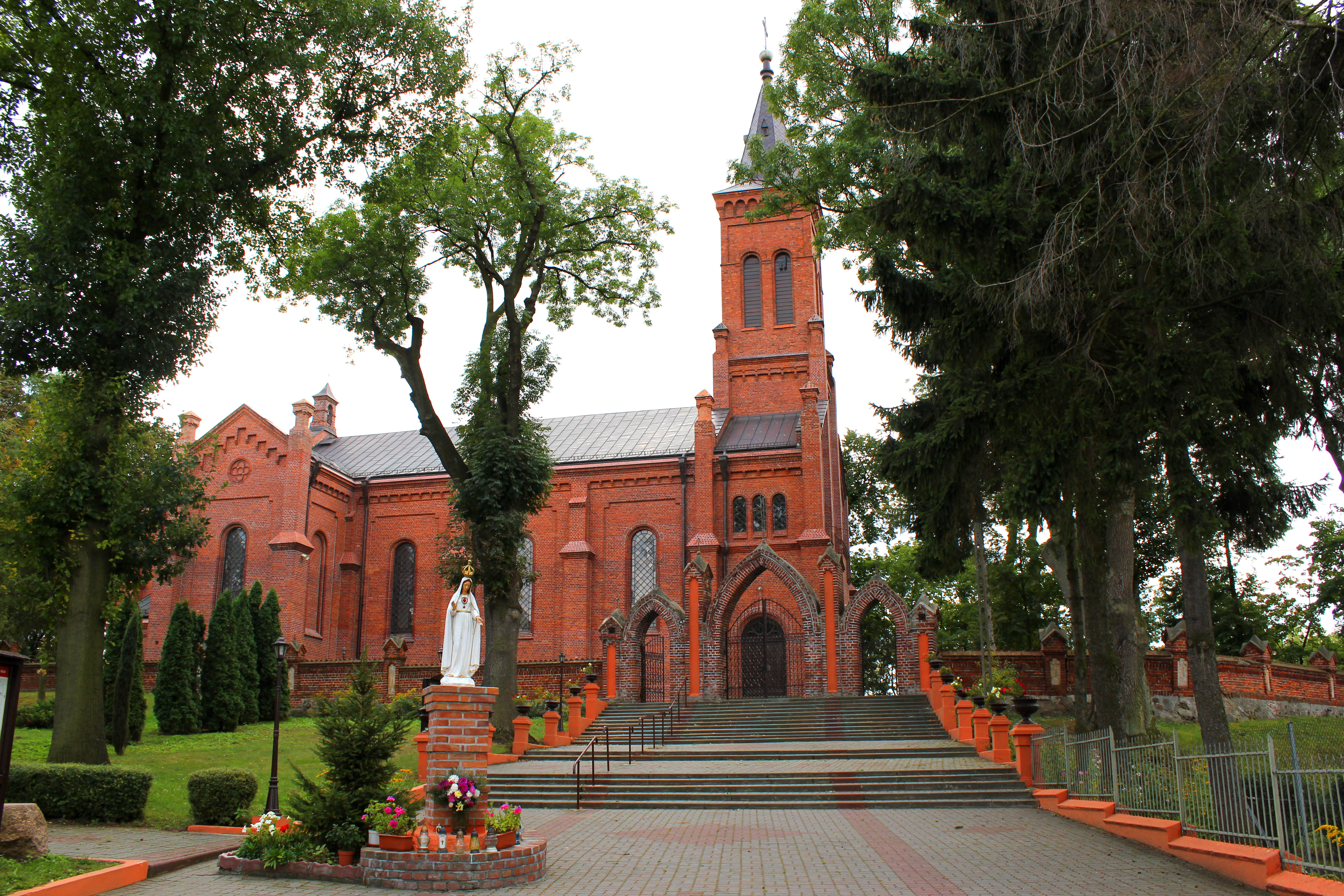
- Saint Adalbert church in Kikół

- Flag Coat of arms

- Location within Poland
- Coordinates: 52°55′N 19°7′E
- Country: Poland
- Voivodeship: Kuyavian-Pomeranian
- County: Lipno
- Gmina: Kikół
- First mentioned: 1236

Population
  - Total: 1,500
- Time zone: UTC+1 (CET)
  - Summer (DST): UTC+2 (CEST)
- Vehicle registration: CLI
- Website: http://www.kikol.pl

Kikół [ˈkikuu̯] is a town in Lipno County, Kuyavian-Pomeranian Voivodeship, in north-central Poland. It is the seat of the gmina (administrative district) called Gmina Kikół. It is located on the eastern shore of Lake Kikolskie in the Dobrzyń Land.

== History ==
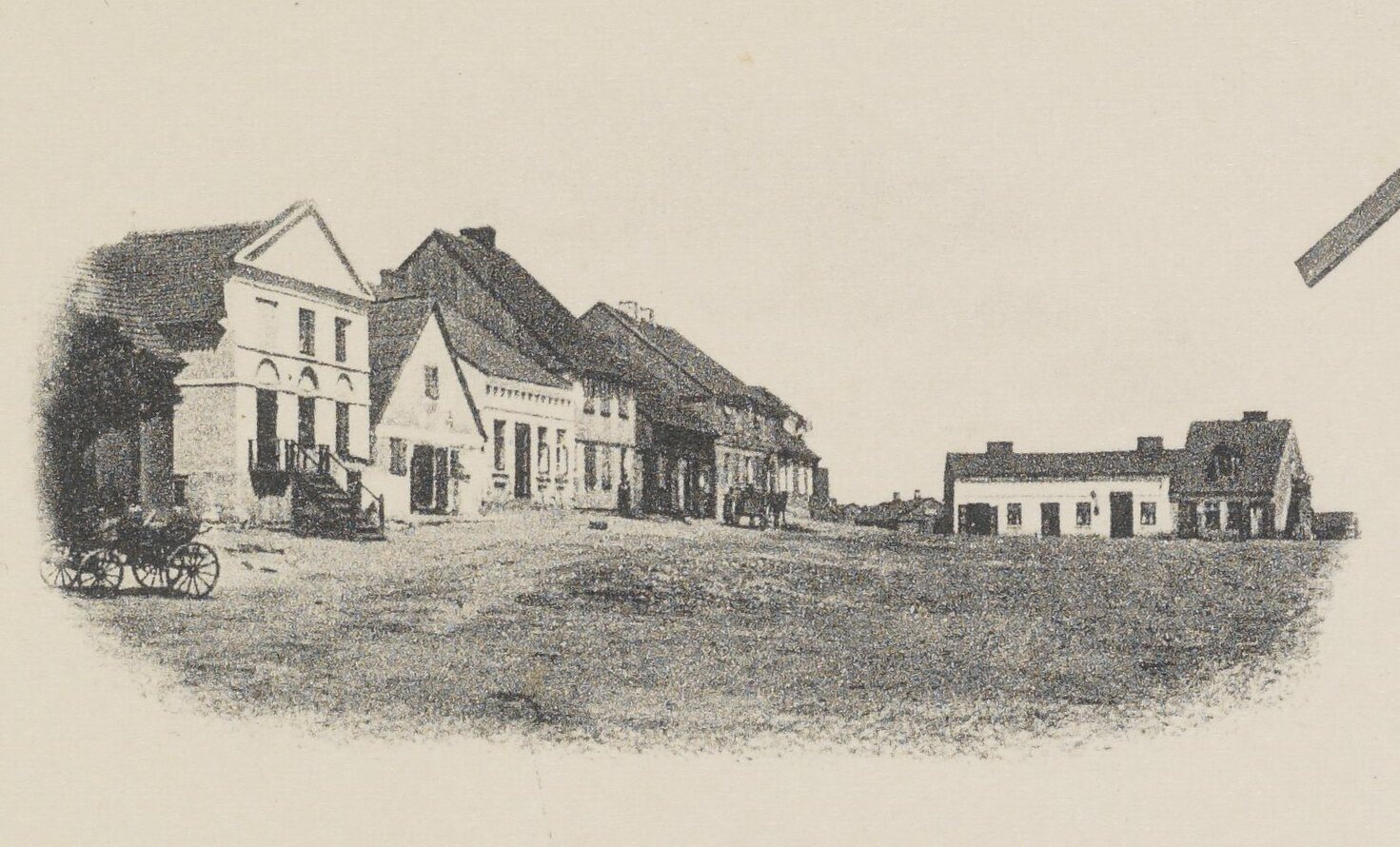
Early 20th-century view of Kikół

The village was first mentioned in 1236. It was located on a trade route connecting Płock and Płońsk with Toruń. In 1685, it became a possession of Wojciech Jan Zboiński of Ogończyk coat of arms. Kikół became the seat of the Zboiński family, and Ignacy Antoni Zboiński built a new palace. In 1827, Kikół was visited by young Fryderyk Chopin, who gave a concert at the palace.

During the German occupation of Poland (World War II), Poles from Kikół were among the victims of large massacres of Poles from the county carried out by the Germans in nearby Karnkowo as part of the Intelligenzaktion. The local school principal was among Polish principals and teachers murdered in the Mauthausen concentration camp.

== Notable residents ==
- Meyer Wolf Weisgal (1894–1977), American journalist, publisher, and playwright; President of the Weizmann Institute of Science
