= Bielawa =

Town in Lower Silesian Voivodeship, Poland

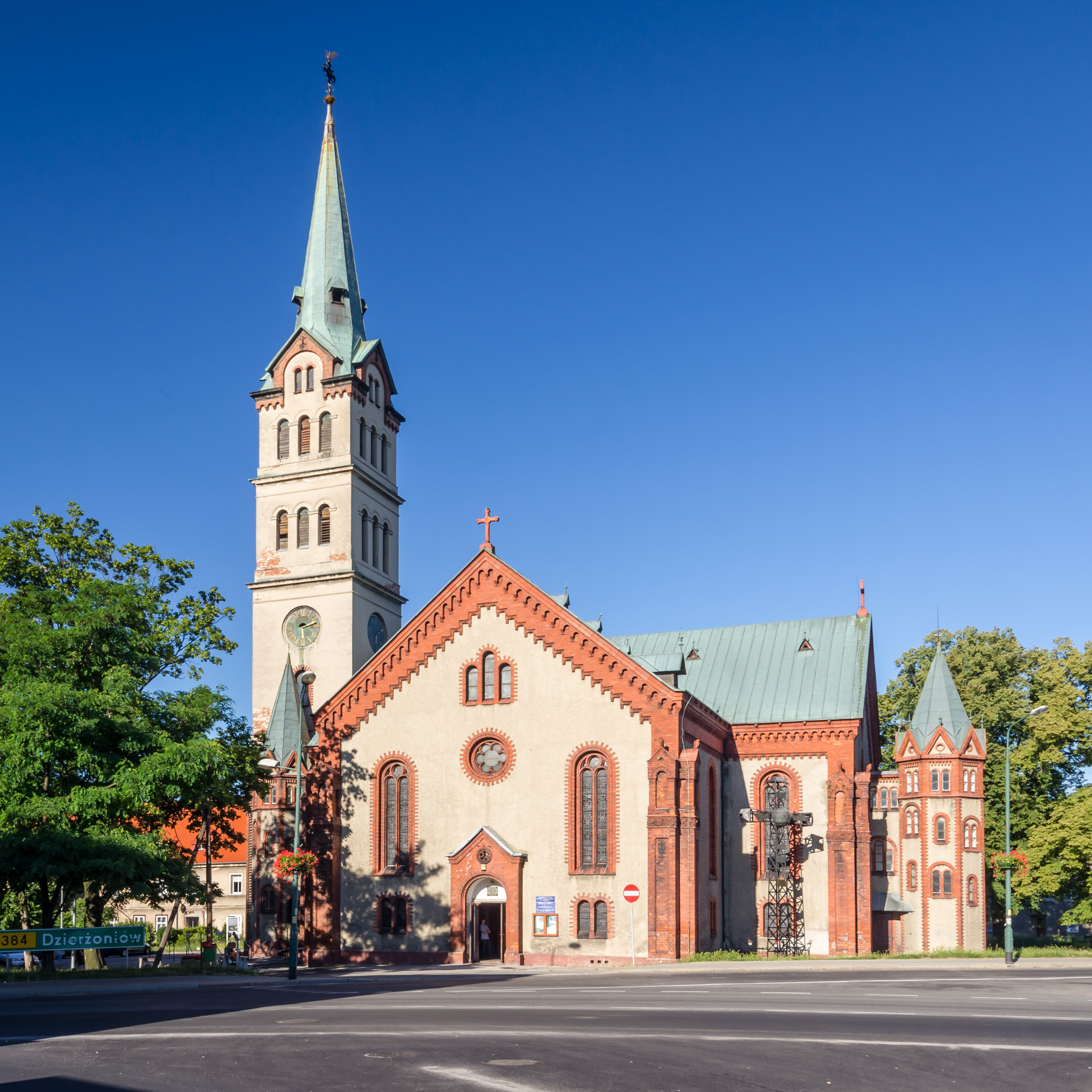
- Corpus Christi church in Bielawa

- Flag Coat of arms

- Location within Poland
- Coordinates: 50°42′N 16°37′E
- Country: Poland
- Voivodeship: Lower Silesian
- County: Dzierżoniów
- Gmina: Bielawa (urban gmina)
- First mentioned: 1284
- Town rights: 1924

Government
  - Mayor: Andrzej Hordyj

Area
  - Total: 36.21 km^{2} (13.98 sq mi)
- Highest elevation: 964 m (3,163 ft)
- Lowest elevation: 280 m (920 ft)

Population (31 December 2021)
  - Total: 29,232
  - Density: 807/km^{2} (2,090/sq mi)
- Time zone: UTC+1 (CET)
  - Summer (DST): UTC+2 (CEST)
- Postal code: 58-260 to 58-263
- Area code: +48 74
- Car plates: DDZ
- Website: http://um.bielawa.pl

Bielawa [bʲɛˈlava] (German: Langenbielau) is a town in Dzierżoniów County, Lower Silesian Voivodeship, in southwestern Poland. As of January 1, 2023, it has a population of 28 344.

== Geography ==
Bielawa lies in the central part of Lower Silesia, along the Bielawica stream in the Owl Mountains region. The town covers an area in excess of 36 square kilometres (14 sq mi).

Bielawa lies at an altitude range of 280 and 964 m above sea level, in the Owl Mountains. The town is a year-round tourist destination; its outdoor attractions include four major hiking trails of varying difficulty in an 80 km^{2} (31 mi^{2}) park, as well as cycling trails and ski lifts.

== Etymology ==
The name is of Polish origin and is derived from the word biela, bila, current Polish biała ("white").

== History ==
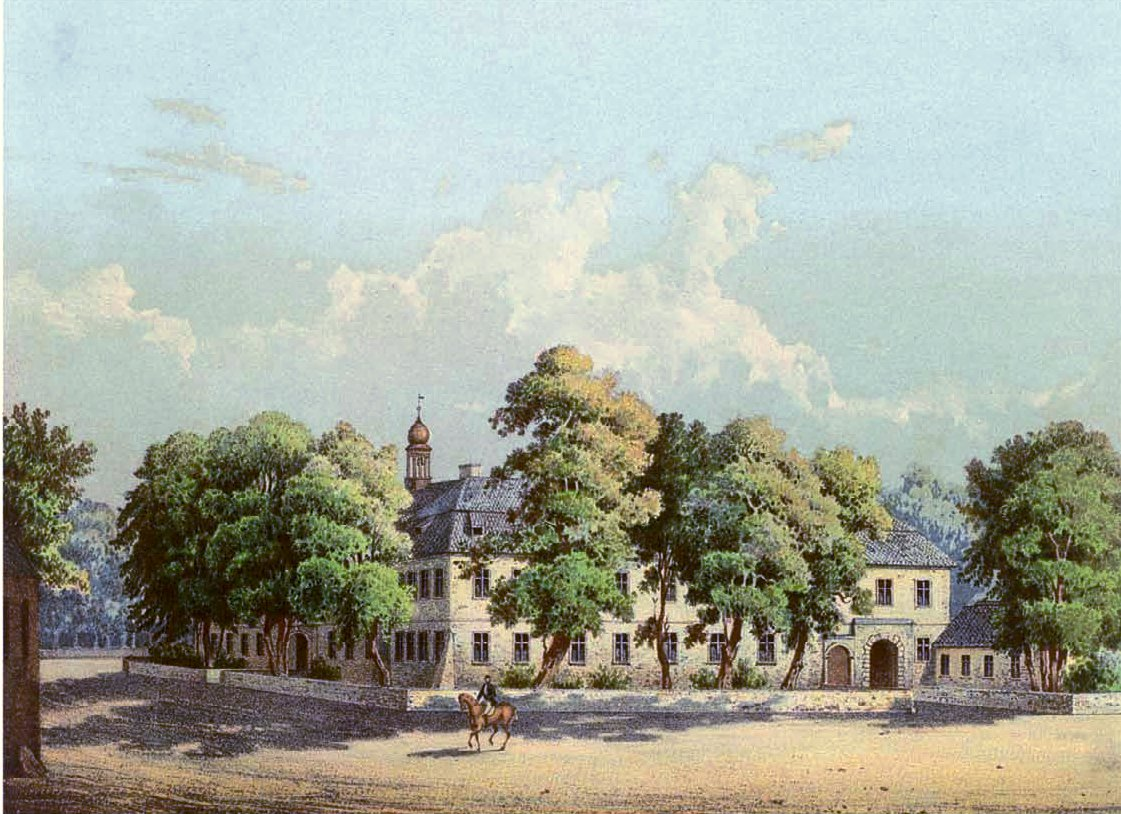
19th-century drawing of the castle

The oldest known mention of Bielawa dates back to 1284 in a letter sent by Bishop Tomasz II of Wrocław to a group of church leaders from the order of St. Augustine, where he complained that the duke Henry IV Probus has claimed possession of a list of villages that used to belong to the bishopric of Wrocław, including Bela, the Latin form of Bielawa. Also in 1288, Bialawa is mentioned when it was part of fragmented Piast-ruled Poland.

In 1720 the first brick house was built in the village and in 1741 it was captured and afterwards annexed by Prussia. In 1805 Christian Dierig founded a weaving company (Christian Dierig AG). During the Napoleonic Wars, the village was occupied by France. In 1844 it was the site of the Weavers' Uprising, brutally crushed by the Prussians. From 1871 to 1945 it was part of Germany. In 1891 the Dzierżoniów–Bielawa railway line opened. In 1924 Bielawa obtained town rights. During World War II the Germans established the FAL Langenbielau II subcamp of the Gross-Rosen concentration camp in the town. In 1945 it was captured by the Soviets and eventually reintegrated with Poland. Greeks, refugees of the Greek Civil War, settled in Bielawa in the 1950s.

From 1975 to 1998, it was part of the Wałbrzych Voivodeship.

== Demographics ==
Historical population

Year	Pop.	±%
1870	12,000	—
1939	20,116	+67.6%
1946	17,269	−14.2%
1950	22,367	+29.5%
1955	25,520	+14.1%
1960	28,090	+10.1%
1965	30,869	+9.9%

Year	Pop.	±%
1970	31,051	+0.6%
1975	32,328	+4.1%
1980	32,309	−0.1%
1985	33,983	+5.2%
1990	34,344	+1.1%
1992	34,851	+1.5%
1997	34,008	−2.4%

Year	Pop.	±%
2002	31,787	−6.5%
2007	31,106	−2.1%
2012	31,480	+1.2%
2017	30,207	−4.0%
2021	29,232	−3.2%

== Main sights ==
There are numerous historical buildings in Bielawa. At its center is the 19th-century Neo-Gothic Church of the Assumption with a 101 m tall tower, the third tallest in Poland. Other buildings include a late-Renaissance palace originally built as a fortified manor house; the Church of the Corpus Christi, erected in 1743; and numerous 18th-century Baroque houses that were restored in the 19th and early 20th centuries. It is also a home to a number of medieval penitential crosses.

== Transport ==
Bielawa has four railway stations: Bielawa Centralna, Bielawa Zachodnia, Bielawa Jezioro, and Bielawa Góry Sowie; all of which are served by regional Lower Silesian Railways services.. Bielawa Jezioro and Bielawa Góry Sowie opened in June 2026.

== Twin towns and sister cities ==
Bielawa is twinned with:

- Chatham-Kent, Canada
- Ciechanów, Poland
- Hronov, Czech Republic
- Kostelec nad Orlicí, Czech Republic
- Lingen, Germany

== Surroundings ==
- Gola Dzierżoniowska Castle
- Medieval town of Niemcza
- Cistercian monastery at Henryków

== Notable people ==
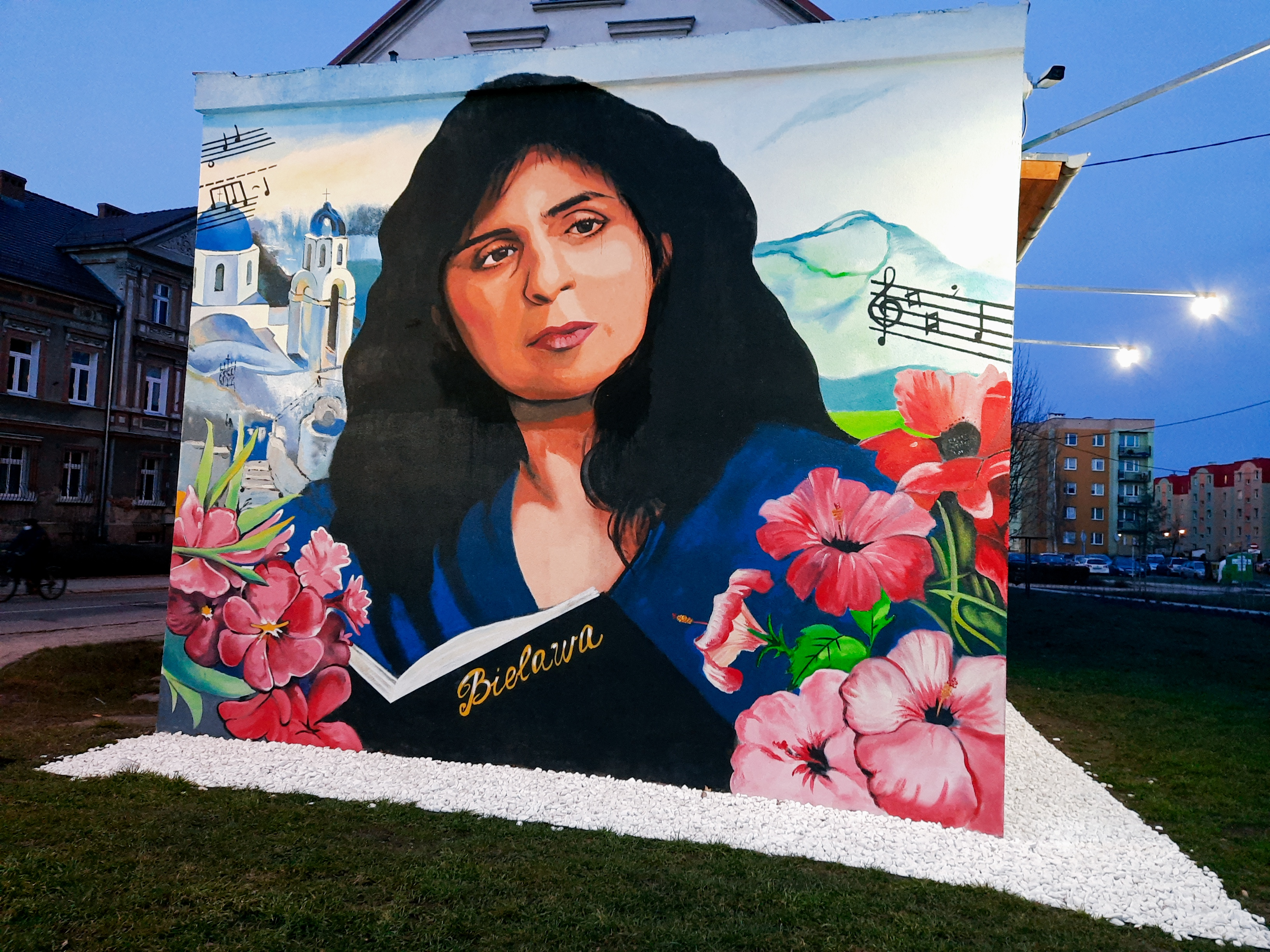
Mural of singer Eleni

- Jeremiah Dencke (1725−1795), composer
- Ferdinand Gottlieb Flechtner (1811–1867), German industrialist
- Adolph Franz (1842–1916), German politician
- Friedrich Dierig (1845–1931), German industrialist
- Arthur Philipp Flechtner (1858–1936), Prussian General
- Karl Franz (1881–1967), German politician
- Georg Muschner (1885–1971), German cinematographer
- Walter Möse (1920–1944), Wehrmacht Oberfeldwebel
- Waltraut Engelberg (born 1929), author and wife of Ernst Engelberg
- Johann Alexander Wisniewsky (1929–2012), German industrialist
- Horst Weigang (born 1940), German athlete
- Eleni Tzoka (born 1956), Polish singer
- Aleksandra Kwasniewska (born 1978), Polish singer
- Robert Skibniewski (born 1983), Polish basketball player
- Jarosław Kuźniar (born 1979), Polish journalist and TV presenter
- Janusz Góra (born 1963), Polish footballer
- Art Binkowski (born 1975), Polish-Canadian boxer
- Jarosław Jach (born 1994), Polish footballer

== Gallery ==
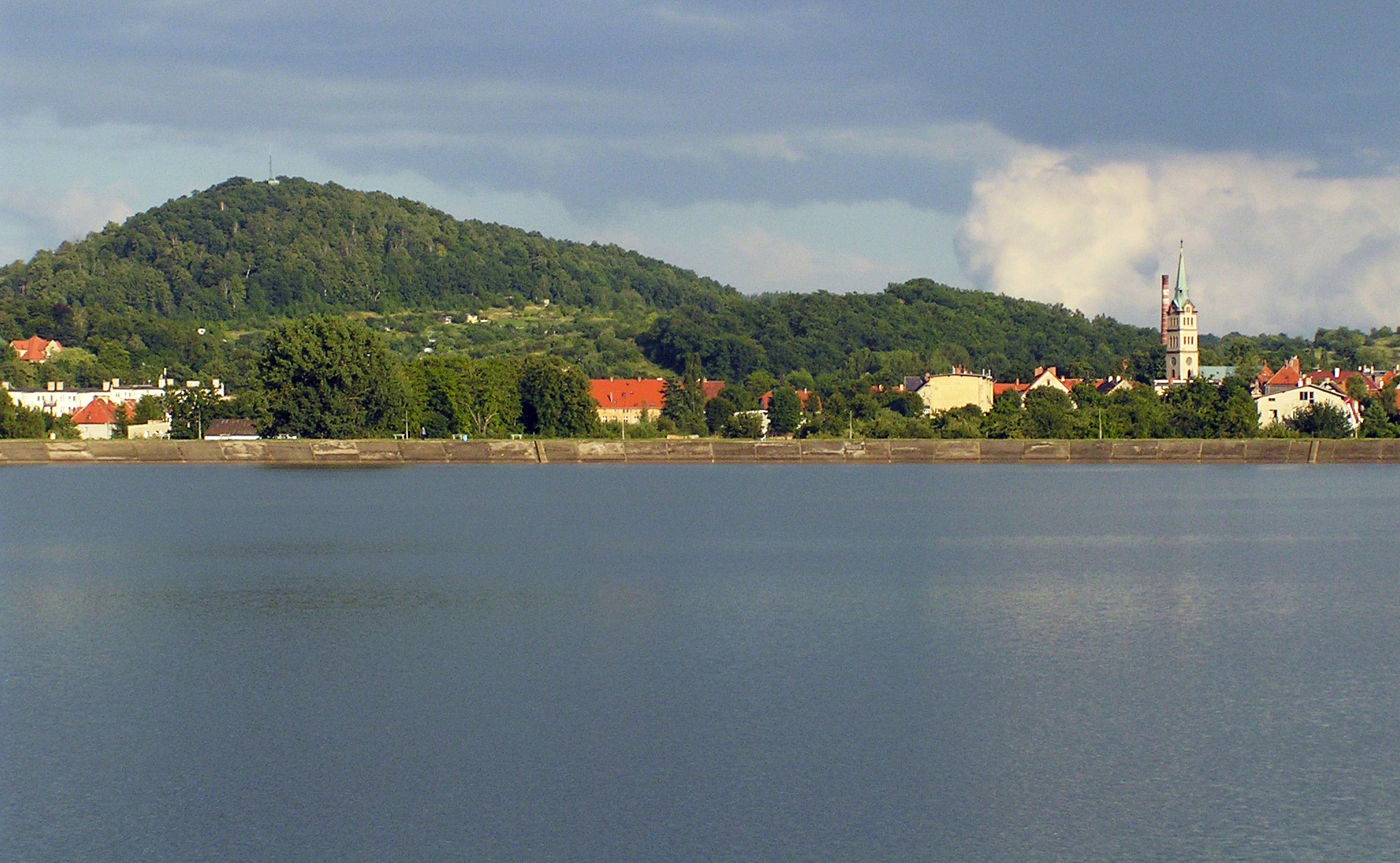
Parkowa Hill and Bielawa Lake in Bielawa

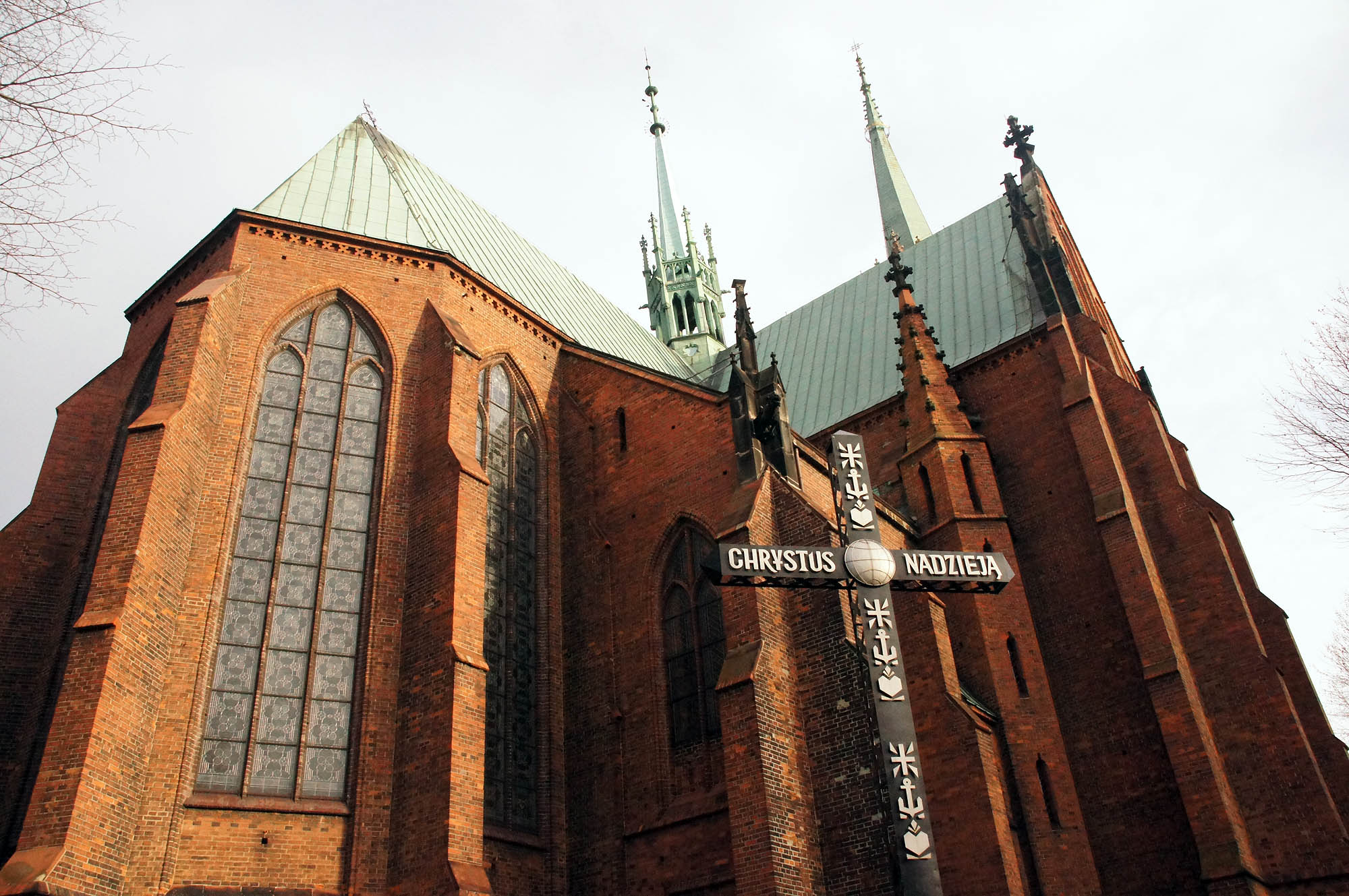
Church of the Assumption of Mary

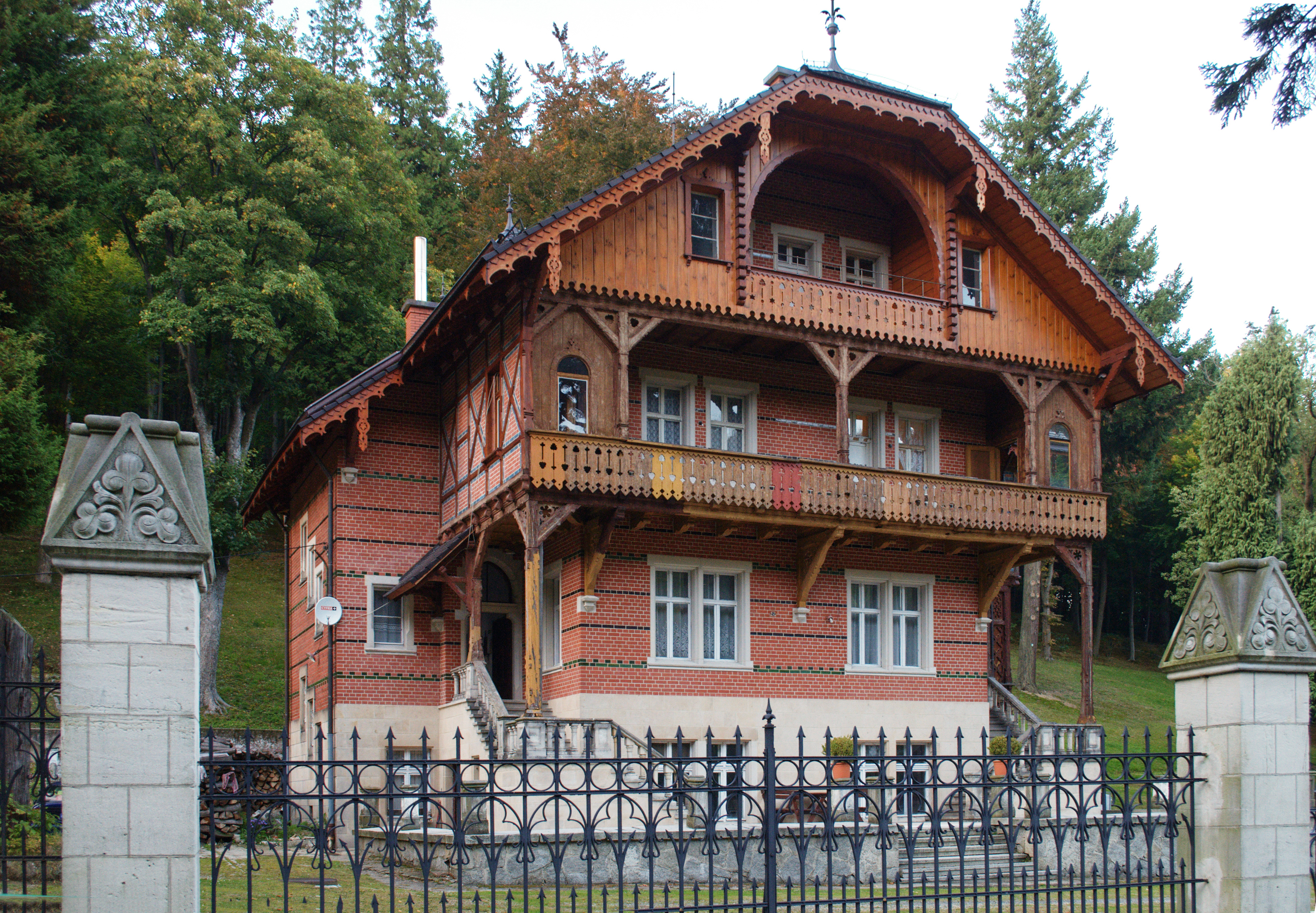
Pension Leśny Dworek

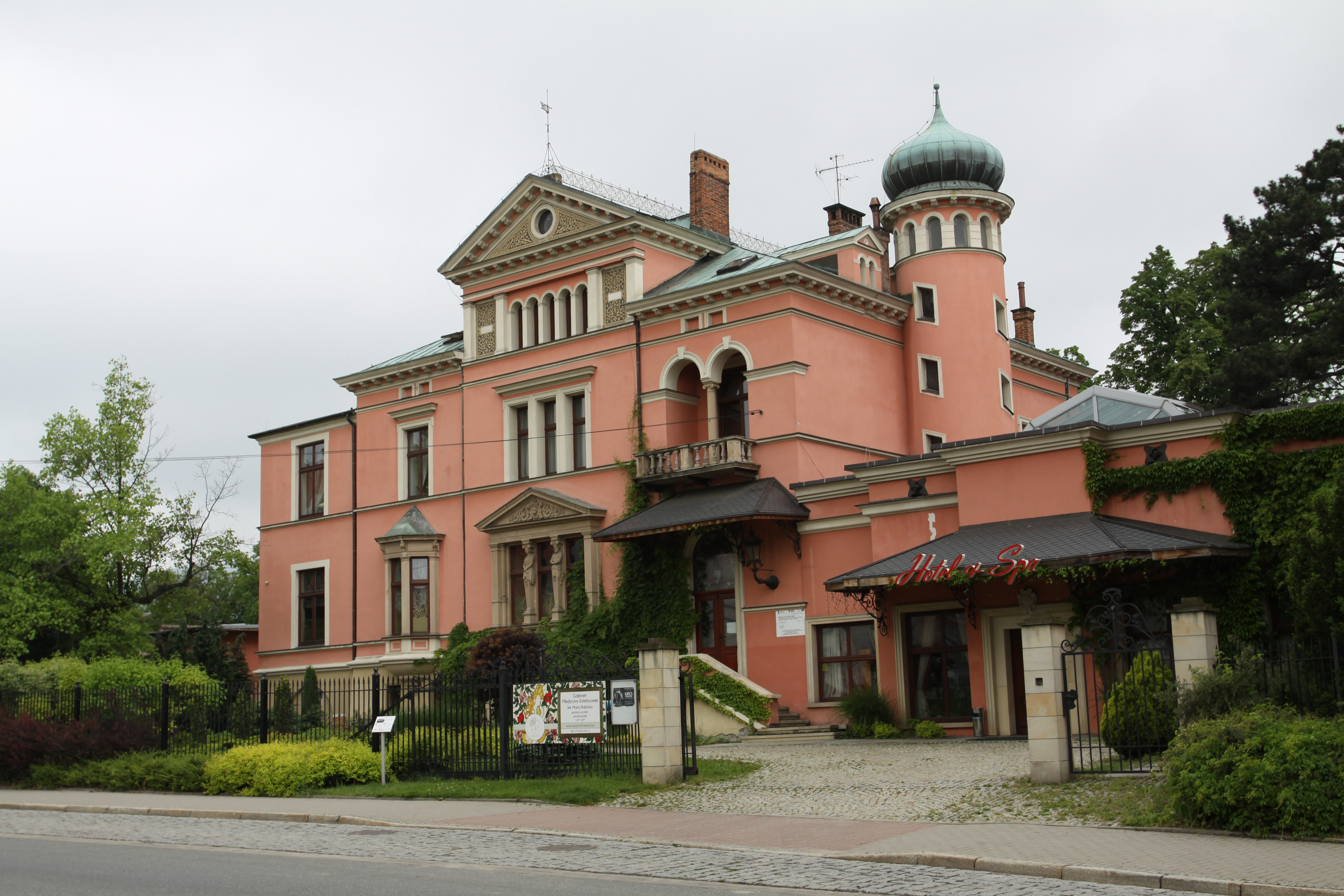
Palace

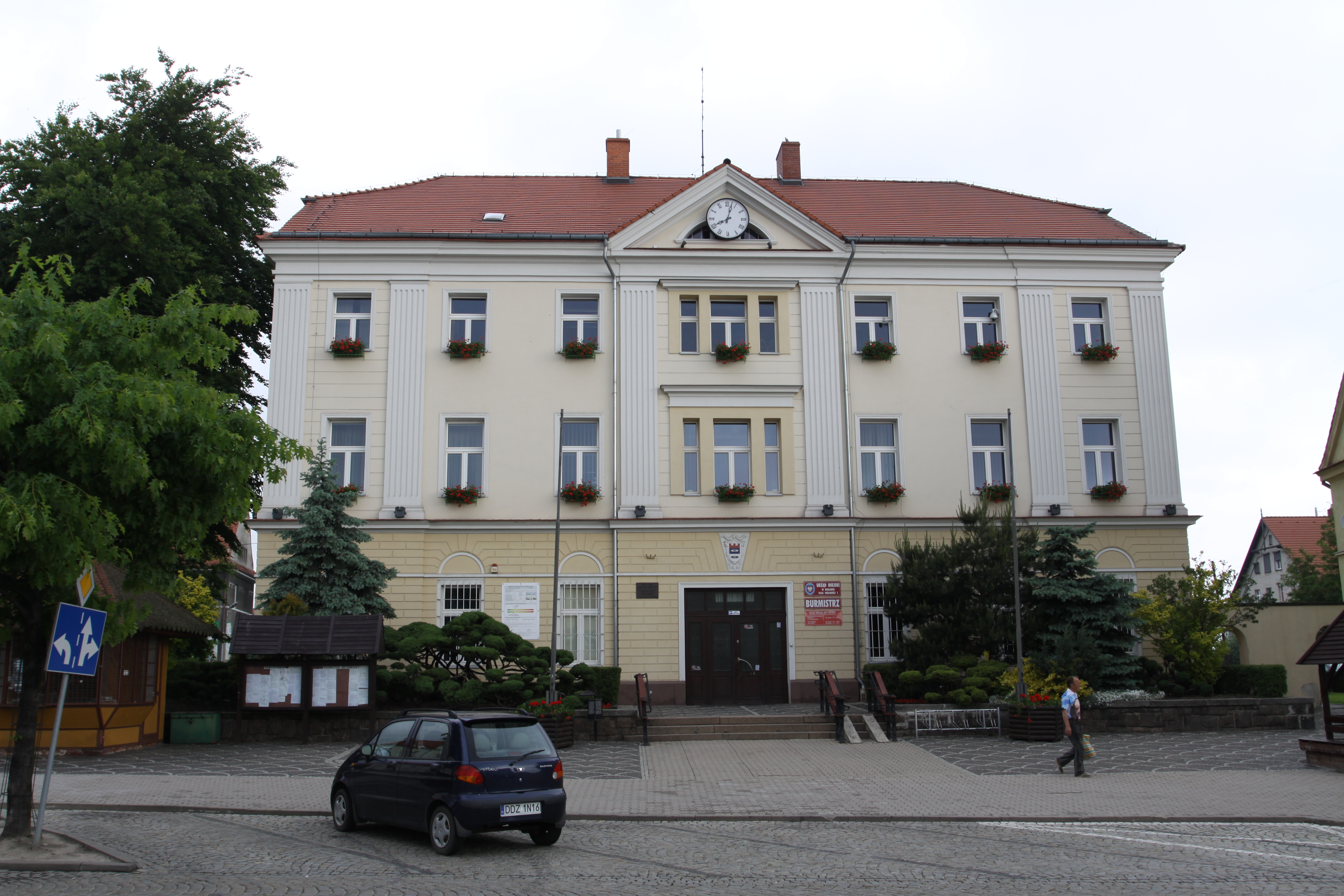
Town hall

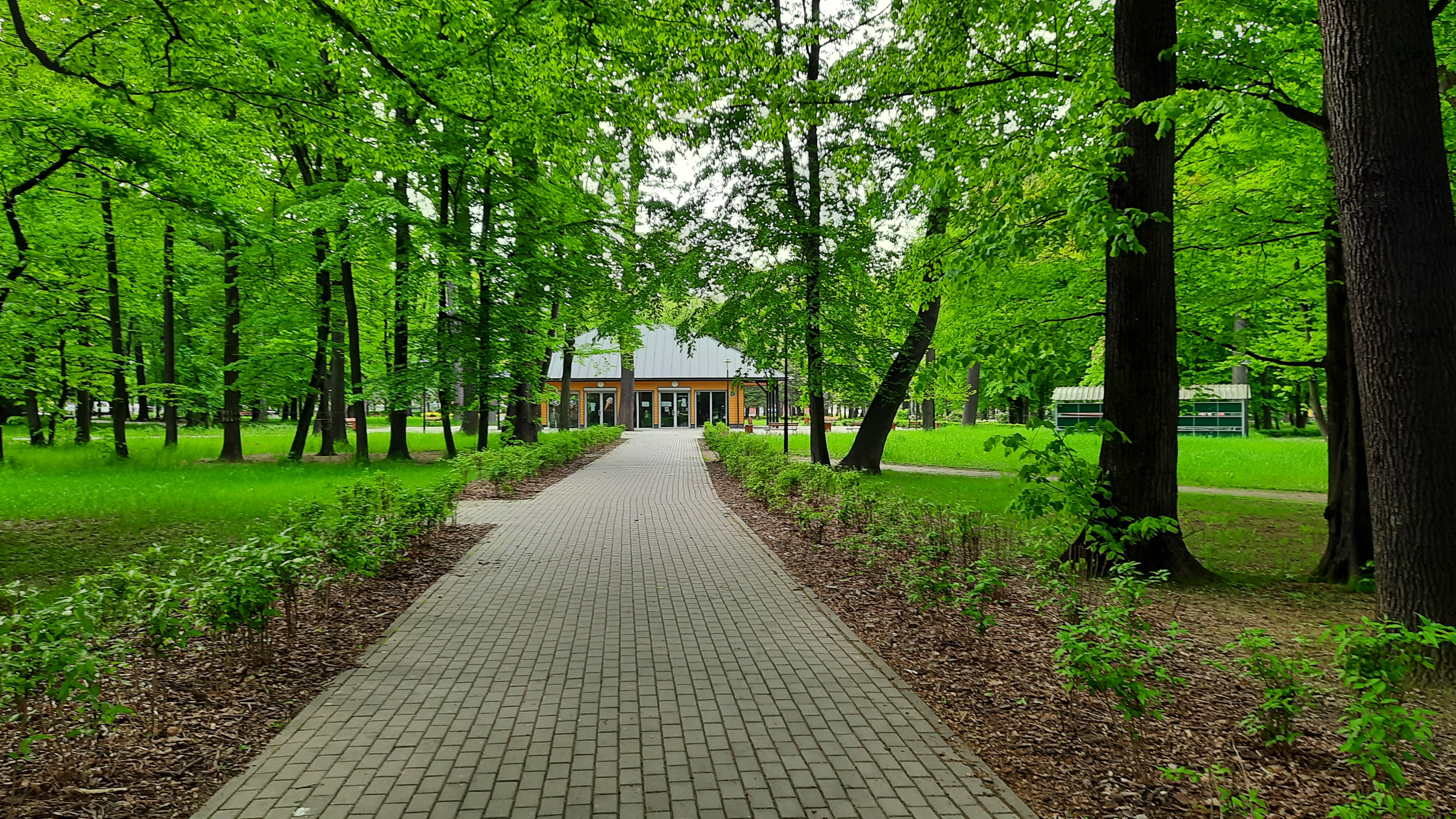
Municipal Park

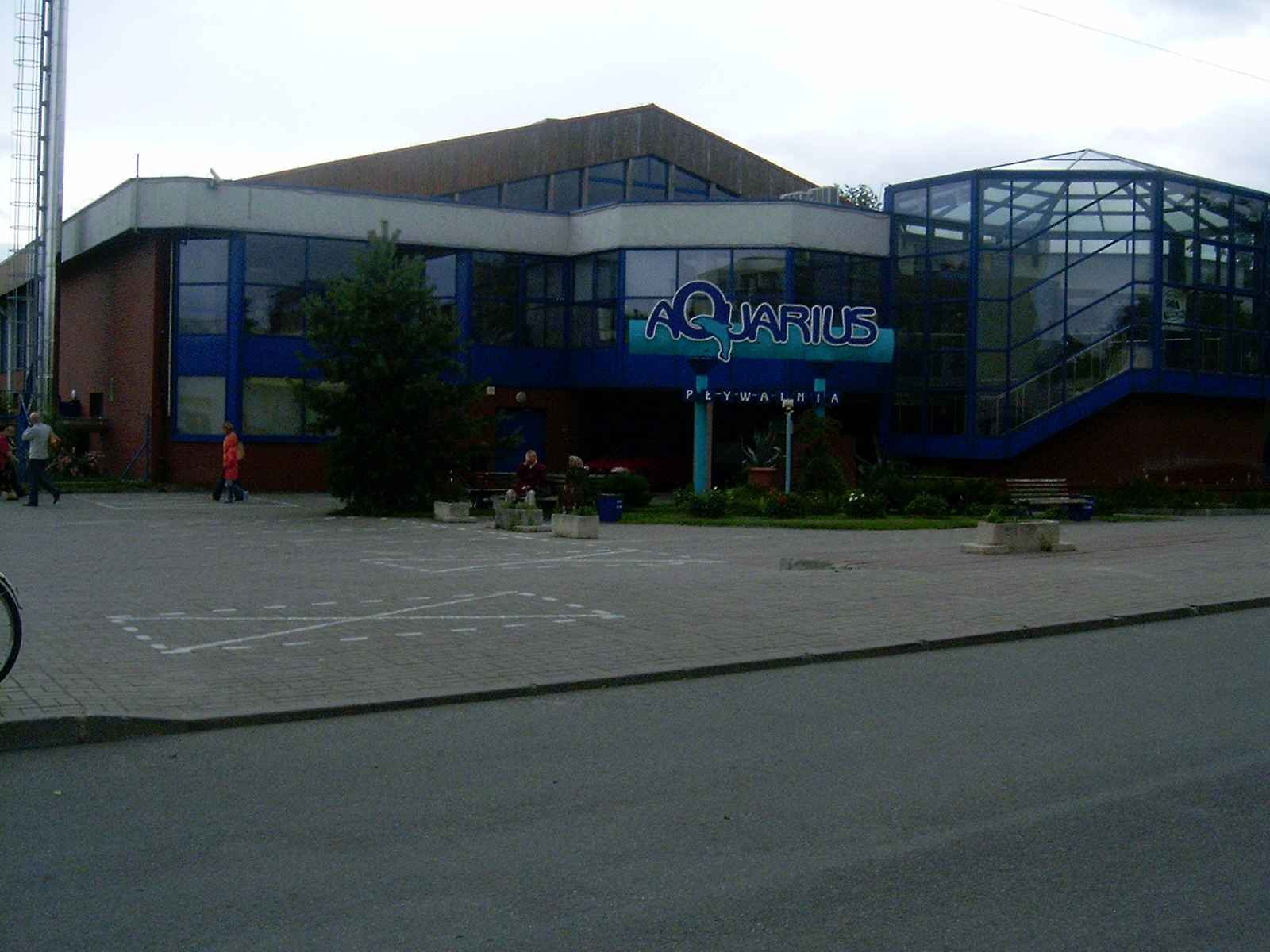
swimming pool "Aquarius"

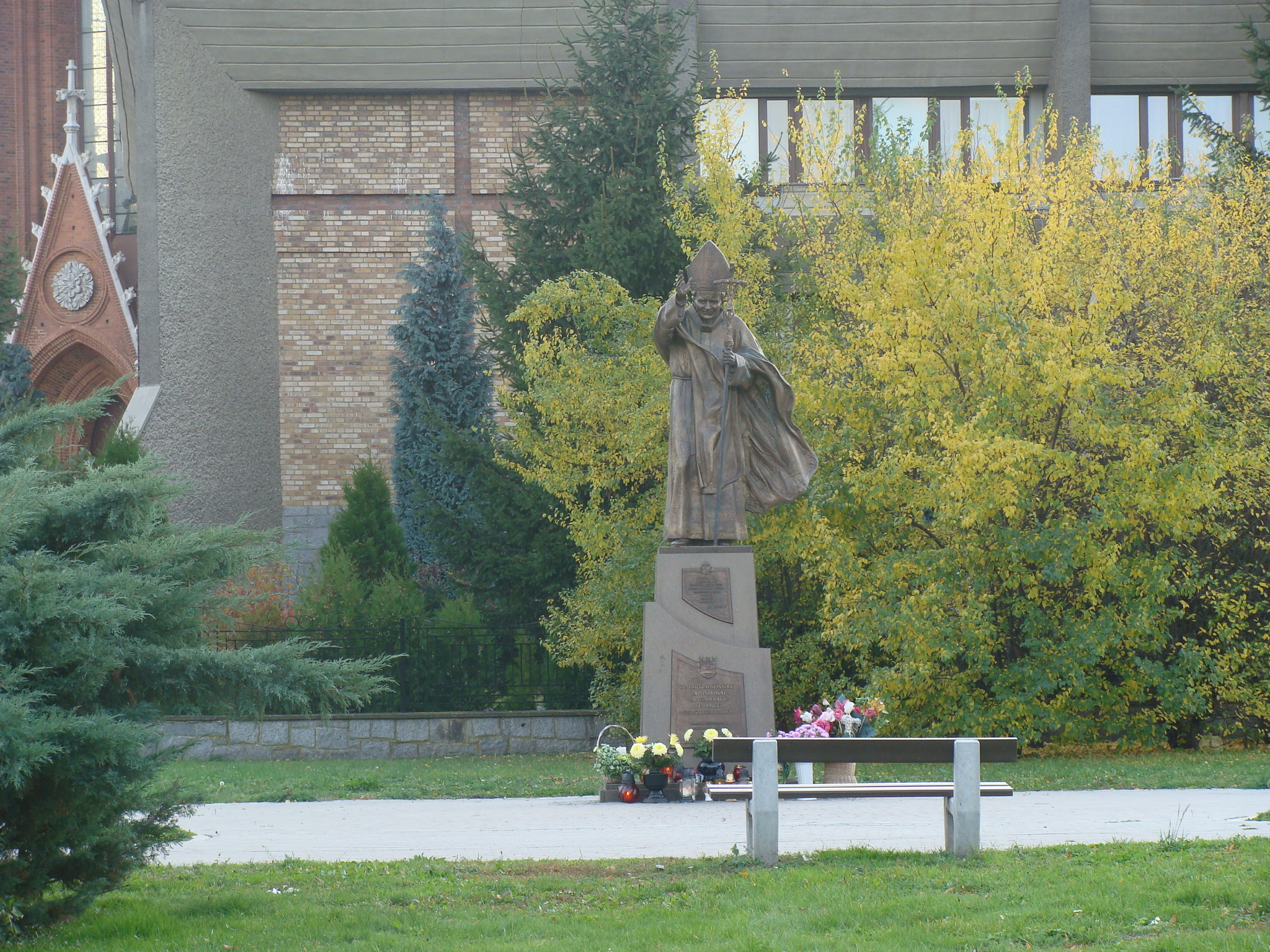
Monument of Pope John Paul II

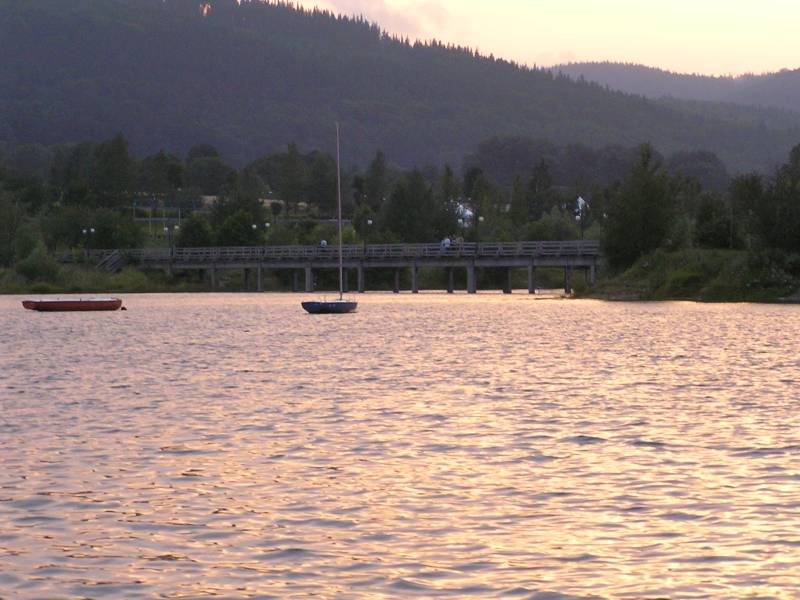
Lake in Bielawa
