= Aleksandra Kwasniewska =

Polish folk-pop singer

- Born: Bielawa, Poland
- Genres: Pop, folk, jazz
- Occupations: Singer, songwriter
- Instruments: Vocals, piano
- Years active: 2004–present
- Label: AK Music Ltd

Aleksandra Kwasniewska (born in Bielawa, Poland) is a Polish folk-pop singer. Since 2005 she has lived and worked in London. She recorded and released her debut album Island Girl with the band "The Belgian Sweets" in 2008. Aleksandra released her second album, The Sky is on Fire in 2012, and her third album „Clover” in 2017. Currently Aleksandra is a songwriter for the sync industry.

== Education ==
Kwasniewska studied English language at Wroclaw University in Poland, but she received her musical education at Jazz Faculty in Belgium. She graduated from the School of Popular Music in London and continues her studies at School for Singers in London, where she learns singing and song-writing.

== Early career ==
In 2004, Kwasniewska worked with a number of Belgian musicians on The Polish Folk Jazz Project, including jazz saxophone player John Snauwaert, pianist Christian Mendoza, drummer Giovanni Barcella and double bass player Koen Kimpe. Later Kwasniewska was recommended to the Belgian producer and songwriter Pedro DeBruyckere, who invited her to sing lead vocals on his album The Rosebud Orchestra. She would later collaborate with some of these artists on her own album.

== Island Girl (2008) ==
Kwasniewska kept in touch with her Belgian contacts, and eventually reunited with DeBruyckere and Kimpe to record her debut album, Island Girl. Keyboardist Peter Ryckeboer and drummer Neils Delvaux were also brought on board with Kimpe as a part of The Belgian Sweets band. The ten track album was notable for including poetry by renowned writer Halina Poświatowska set to music.

The album was funded independently and released through the 33 Jazz label in the United Kingdom, Poland, and Japan. Island Girl was warmly received by critics and music journalists, and was ranked alongside the earlier achievements of Anna Maria Jopek and Aga Zaryan. The group embarked on a tour across Europe in support of the album. During this time, they performed at many well-known venues in London, including Ronnie Scott's Jazz Club, Barbican Centre, and the Royal National Theatre.

In addition to her solo work, Kwasniewska has collaborated with various artists from the UK and Poland. She was spotted singing in a café and invited to record an EP for a London-based electronica project. She also contributed harmony vocals to the single "Glowa do gory" by UK/Poland based rock band The Poise Rite.

== The Sky is on Fire (2012) ==
After the successful tour, Kwasniewska went back into the studio to begin work on her next album. In May 2011, Aleksandra & The Belgian Sweets played new material from the upcoming album in Belgium and Holland, where they had the chance to perform at the Music Village in Brussels to the enthusiastic response of the international audience.

Kwasniewska's second album, The Sky is on Fire, was released in 2012. It was preceded by lead single "Snow in July," written by producer DeBruyckere. The song was released to iTunes stores on 19 December 2011.

Along with The Belgian Sweets trio, the album includes support from Renato Marquez on violin, and album engineer HT Roberts adding parts on bouzouki, mandolin, 12-string and 6-string acoustic guitar. The album included additional poetry from Poświatowska and an update of the tango "Ostatnia Niedziela."

== Discography ==
=== Albums ===
- Island Girl (2008)
- The Sky is on Fire (2012)
- ’’Clover’’ (2017)

=== Singles ===
- "Be Close to Me" (2008)
- "Set Little Sun, Set" (2009)
- "Sleeping Unicorn" (2010)
- "The Moon's a Harsh Mistress" (2011)
- "Snow in July" (2011)
- "Little Piano" (2012)
- "Sky is on Fire" (2012)
