= 2027 in Poland =

- Decades: 2000s; 2010s; 2020s
- See also: Other events of 2027; Timeline of Polish history

Events in the year 2027 in Poland.

== Events ==
=== Predicted and scheduled events ===
- 30–July–8 August – 26th World Scout Jamboree
- 10–26 September – 2027 FIVB Men's Volleyball World Cup
- November – 2027 Polish parliamentary election

== Holidays ==
- 1 January – New Year's Day
- 6 January – Epiphany
- 28 March – Easter Sunday
- 29 March – Easter Monday
- 1 May – Labour Day
- 3 May – 3 May Constitution Day
- 16 May – Whit Sunday
- 27 May – Corpus Christi
- 15 August – Assumption Day
- 1 November – All Saints' Day
- 11 November – Independence Day
- 24 December – Christmas Eve
- 25 December – Christmas Day
- 26 December – 2nd Day of Christmas
