= Kołat-Rybniki =

- Village
- Location within Poland
- Coordinates: 52°55′58″N 19°09′26″E
- Country: Poland
- Voivodeship: Kuyavian-Pomeranian
- County: Lipno
- Gmina: Kikół

Kołat-Rybniki [ˈkɔwat rɨbˈniki] is a village in the administrative district of Gmina Kikół, within Lipno County, Kuyavian-Pomeranian Voivodeship, in north-central Poland.
