= Bielawa Góry Sowie railway station =

Railway station in Bielawa, Poland

Bielawa Góry Sowie Bielawa Owl Mountains
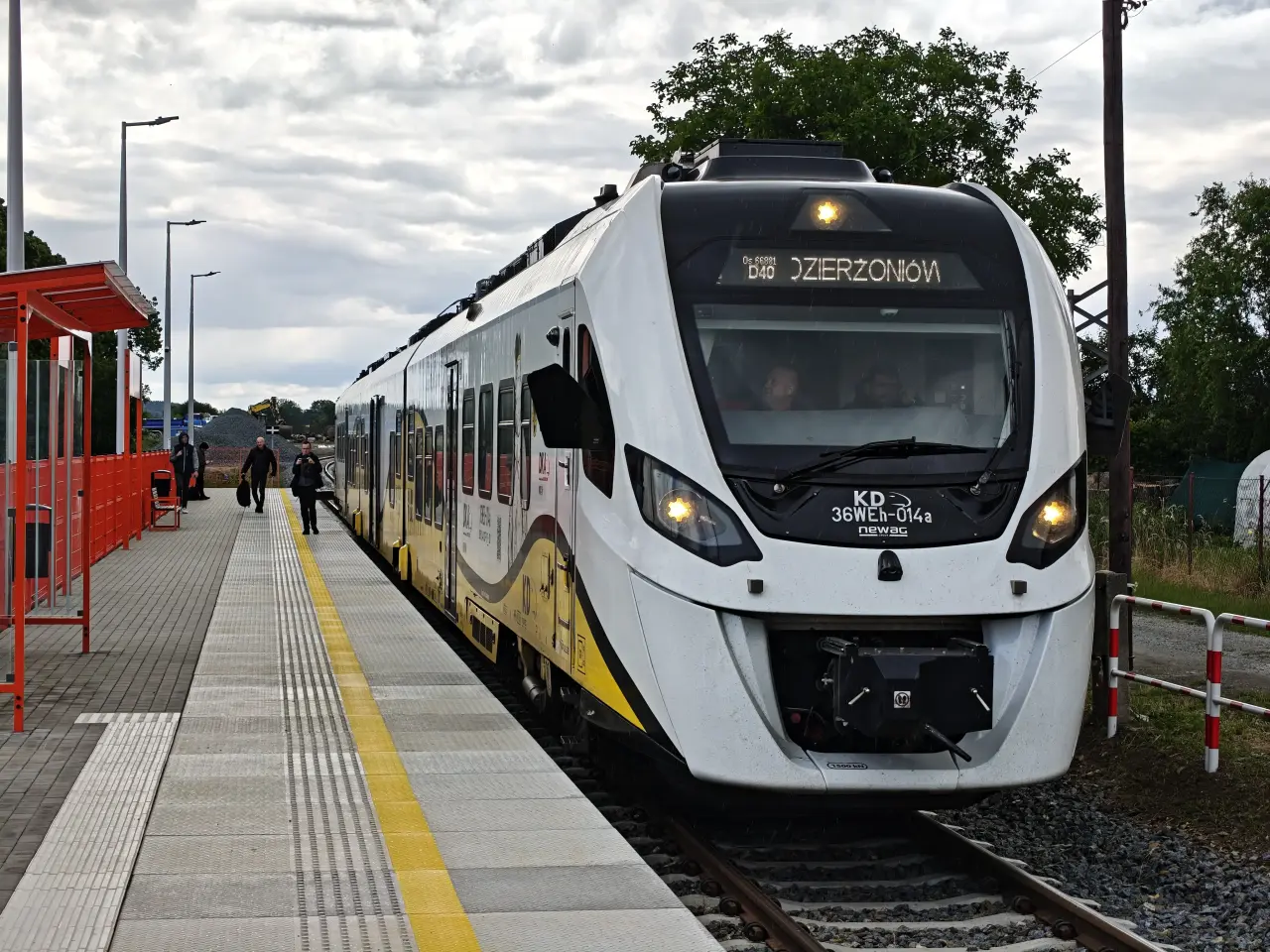
- Lower Silesian Railways Newag Impuls 36WEh at Bielawa Góry Sowie on its first day of reopening

General information
- Location: Bielawa, Lower Silesian Voivodeship; Poland
- Coordinates: 50°39′47.0″N 16°35′59.0″E
- Owner: Lower Silesian Road and Railway Authority in Wrocław
- Line: Dzierżoniów Śląski–Bielawa Góry Sowie
- Platforms: 1

History
- Opened: 14 June 2026
- Former names: Neu bielau (1902–1945); Biała Nowa (1945–1947); Bielawa Nowa (1947–2024); Bielawa Góry Sowie (2024–2026); Bielawa Południowa (2026–2026)

Services
Preceding station	KD	Following station
Bielawa Jezioro towards Wrocław Główny	D4	Terminus
Bielawa Jezioro towards Wrocław Główny	D40	Terminus
Location
- Location within Poland Location within Lower Silesian Voivodeship

Bielawa Góry Sowie (lit. 'Bielawa Owl Mountains') is a railway station on the Dzierżoniów Śląski–Bielawa Góry Sowie railway in the town of Bielawa, Dzierżoniów County within the Lower Silesian Voivodeship in south-western Poland.

== History ==
The original station was opened Eulengebirgsbahn–Aktiengesellschaft as Neu Bielau on 12 December 1900. After World War II, the area came under Polish administration. As a result, the station was taken over by Polish State Railways (PKP) and was renamed to Biała Nowa. Passenger services resumed in July 1946 when the station was downgraded to a railway halt; it was renamed to Bielawa Nowa the following year.

Bielawa Nowa once again closed in 1955–1958, when all traffic resumed after. Freight trains were withdrawn when the goods yard closed in 1965; passenger trains served by the station until its closure on 22 May 1977. Tracks were dismantled in 1995.

=== Revitalisation and reopening ===
In December 2019, Bielawa regained passenger services after Bielawa Zachodnia and Bielawa Centralna railway stations opened. Soon after, plan work on revitalising the Bielawa Zachodnia Dworzec Mały–Radków railway between Bielawa Zachodnia and Srebrna Góra began. In early 2022, a tender was announced for the development of the technical documentation necessary to implement the project. In August 2024, Gmina Bielawa requested the station to be renamed to Bielawa Góry Sowie, after the Owl Mountains, in order to make the station more attractive to tourists. The line was redesignated to the Dzierżoniów Śląski–Bielawa Góry Sowie railway; revitalisation work began in December 2025. In February 2026, the Lower Silesian Road and Railway Authority in Wrocław (DSDiK), the infrastructure manager of the railway raised concerns that the name "Bielawa Góry Sowie" was "too pro-tourist" and may not be accepted by PKP, which may lead to the station not being opened to its target date, June 2026. DSDiK proposed "Bielawa Południowa; lit. 'Bielawa South'", which was inaugurated on 16 February. After negotiations between Gmina Bielawa and PKP, it came to a conclusion that the original name, Bielawa Góry Sowie, would remain, which was inaugurated in March.

The first test runs of Lower Silesian Railways (KD) trains began on 18 May. Bielawa Góry Sowie opened on 14 June, together with Bielawa Jezioro. A future extension is planned to Srebrna Góra to open by 2027, as Bielawa Góry Sowie continues to serve as a terminus of KD routes D4 and D40.

== Train services ==
The station is served by the following services:

- Regional services (KD) Wrocław - Jaworzyna Śląska - Świdnica - Bielawa Góry Sowie
