= Anna Kurek (resistance member) =

Polish nurse (1929–2026)

Anna Helena Kurek (née Runowska; 20 September 1929 – 2 January 2026), code named Anka, was a Polish nurse, and a member of the Polish resistance during the Warsaw Uprising in World War II. She joined the resistance at the age of 15.

== Life and work ==
Kurek was born in Warsaw on 20 September 1929. During the German occupation of Poland, she lived in Warsaw, within the modern Wola district, with her parents and siblings. In 1944, at the age of 15, she joined the Polish resistance in the Warsaw Uprising. Together with other insurgents, she crossed to their positions in the Old Town, where she volunteered as a nurse in the Central Surgical Hospital No. 1, set up in the Raczyński Palace at 7 Długa Street. Her role included tending to the wounded, and being with the fatally wounded as they died. She belonged to the Bakcyl division of the Group North of the Home Army, and used the cryptonym Anka.

On 27 May 1945, after the end of the war, she married Ryszard Kurek, a fellow resistance fighter of the Warsaw Uprising.

In 2022, she was awarded the Knight's Cross of the Order of Polonia Restituta, by President of Poland Andrzej Duda.

Kurek died on 2 January 2026, at the age of 96.

== Awards and decorations ==
- Knight's Cross of the Order of Polonia Restituta (2022)
