= Aleksandra Kurczab-Pomianowska =

Polish actress and translator (1940–2026)

Kurczab-Pomianowska in 2011

Aleksandra Kurczab-Pomianowska (7 May 1940 – 17 March 2026) was a Polish actress and translator.

== Life and career ==
Kurczab was born in Lviv on 7 May 1940, to writer Jan Kurczab (1903–1969) and Janina née Liebling (1908–2008). She was an actress from 1957 to 1960, primarily at the Municipal Rhapsodic Theatre in Krakow.

She immigrated to Italy in 1968, where she graduated in directing from the Accademia Nazionale D'Arte Drammatica Silvio D'Amico in Rome, and later became an assistant to Kazimierz Dejmek at the Piccolo Teatro in Milan.

Throughout her life, she translated a number of books related to poetry.

Kurczab-Pomianowska died on 17 March 2026, at the age of 85.
