= Teresa Zalewska =

Polish politician (1942–2026)

Member of the Sejm
- In office 18 June 1989 – 25 November 1991

Personal details
- Born: Teresa Anna Zalewska; 20 September 1942 Opoczno, General Government
- Died: 4 January 2026 (aged 83)
- Party: OKP
- Education: University of Łódź
- Occupation: Curator

Teresa Anna Zalewska (20 September 1942 – 4 January 2026) was a Polish politician. A member of the Citizens Parliamentary Party, she served in the Sejm from 1989 to 1991.

Zalewska died on 4 January 2026, at the age of 83.
