= Mirosław Zdanowicz =

Polish social activist and motocross racer (1938–2026)

Mirosław Zdanowicz (8 June 1938 – 2 January 2026) was a Polish social activist and motocross coach.

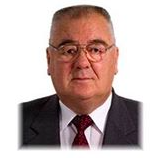
Miroslaw Zdanowicz

== Life and career ==
Zdanowicz was born in Wołkowysk on 8 June 1938. In early life he was a motocross racer. In 1964 he was named Polish champion, after an injury he became the coach of the national team. During twenty years of work (1970–1990), his pupils won the titles of Polish team champion in motocross and speed rally as many as 24 times.

In 1989, he financially and organisationally supported the Solidarity camp in the election campaign to the Sejm and the Senate. During the presidential campaign, he was a member of Lech Walesa's election staff. In the years 1990–1998 he was a member of the Centre Agreement, since 1998 he had been a member of the Christian Democracy party of the Third Republic of Poland, where he served as the President of the Board of the Pomeranian Region and was a member of the National Board, in which he was the treasurer. Since 2002 he has been a member of the Civic Platform.

He was involved in local politics. From 1999 to 2002 he was the chairman of the board of the Strzyża housing estate, then in the years 2002–2018 he was a councillor of the city of Gdańsk (in 2002 as a candidate of the Electoral Committee of Voters and Supporters of Lech Kaczyński Law and Self-Government in subsequent terms – a candidate and councillor of the Civic Platform). In the City Council, he was a member of the Sports and Tourism Committee and the Spatial Development and Environmental Protection Committee. He resigned as a councillor on 22 May 2018, after it came to light that he had bought a plot of land from the municipality without a tender, which was considered unethical and even illegal by the media. On 8 February 2019, the prosecutor's office considered the transaction to have been carried out in accordance with the law, discontinuing the case.

Zdanowicz died on 2 January 2026, at the age of 88.

== Awards ==
Zdanowicz received many decorations and distinctions, m.in. the Silver Cross of Merit (1979), the Knight's Cross of the Order of Polonia Restituta Polish (1987) and the Bronze (1978) and Silver (1983) Badge "Meritorious Activist of Physical Culture".
