= Mirosław Krawczyk =

Polish actor (1953–2026)

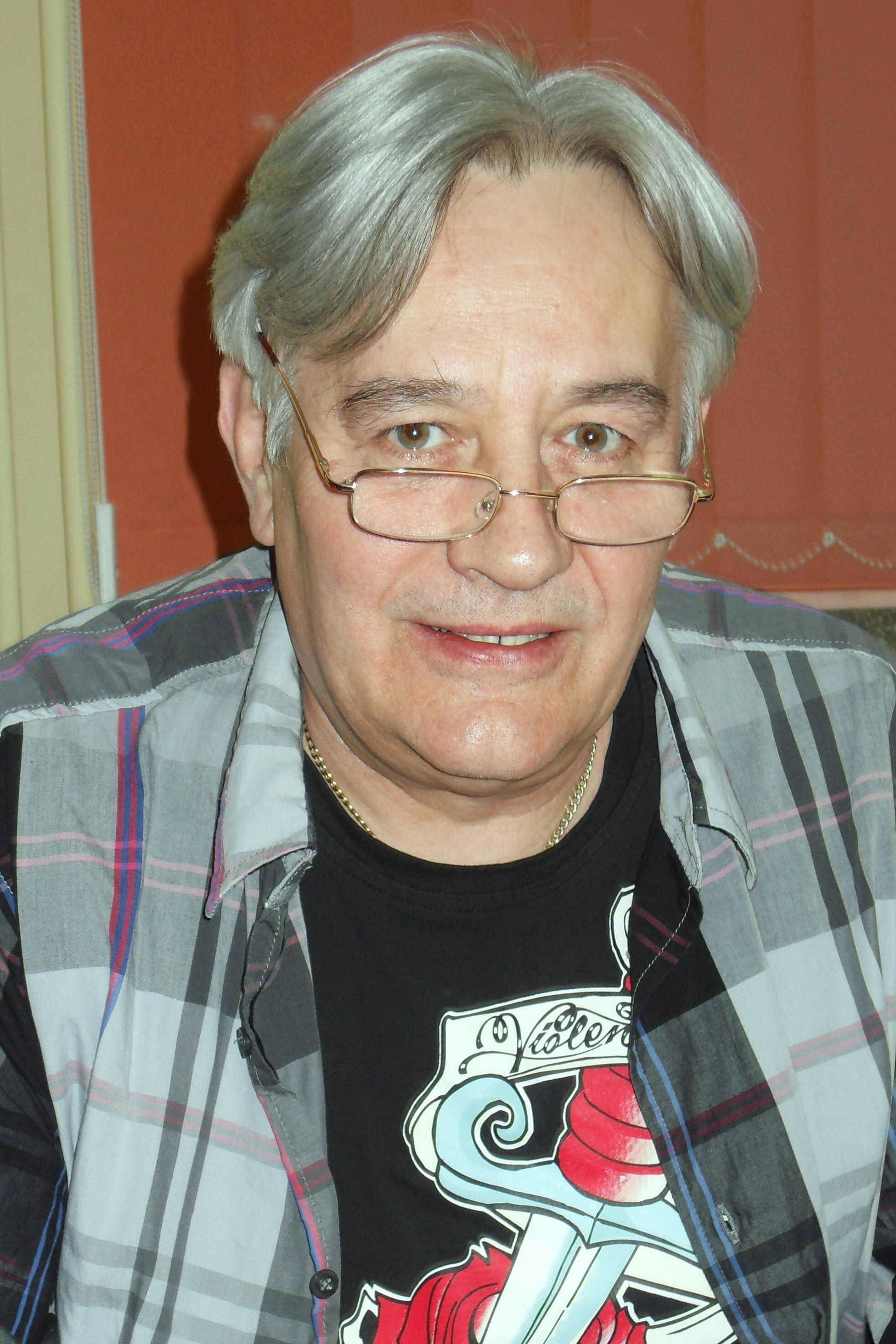
Krawczyk in 2015

Mirosław Krawczyk (7 December 1953 – 21 February 2026) was a Polish actor.

== Life and career ==
Krawczyk was born in Olkusz on 7 December 1953. Throughout his career, he was featured in a number of feature films, including Franciszek Buła's poetic film The Sinful Life (1980), Anna and the Vampire (1981), amongst others, and Disco Polo (2015).

He also performed in the performances of the Television Theatre and the Polish Radio Theatre.

Krawczyk died on 21 February 2026, at the age of 72.

== Awards ==
- Honorary Badge of Merit for Polish Culture (2009)
- Bronze Medal for Merit to Culture Gloria Artis (17 November 2016)
- Award of the Mayor of the City of Gdańsk in the field of culture on the occasion of the 40th anniversary of artistic work (2020)
