= Konotopie =

Village in Poland

- Village
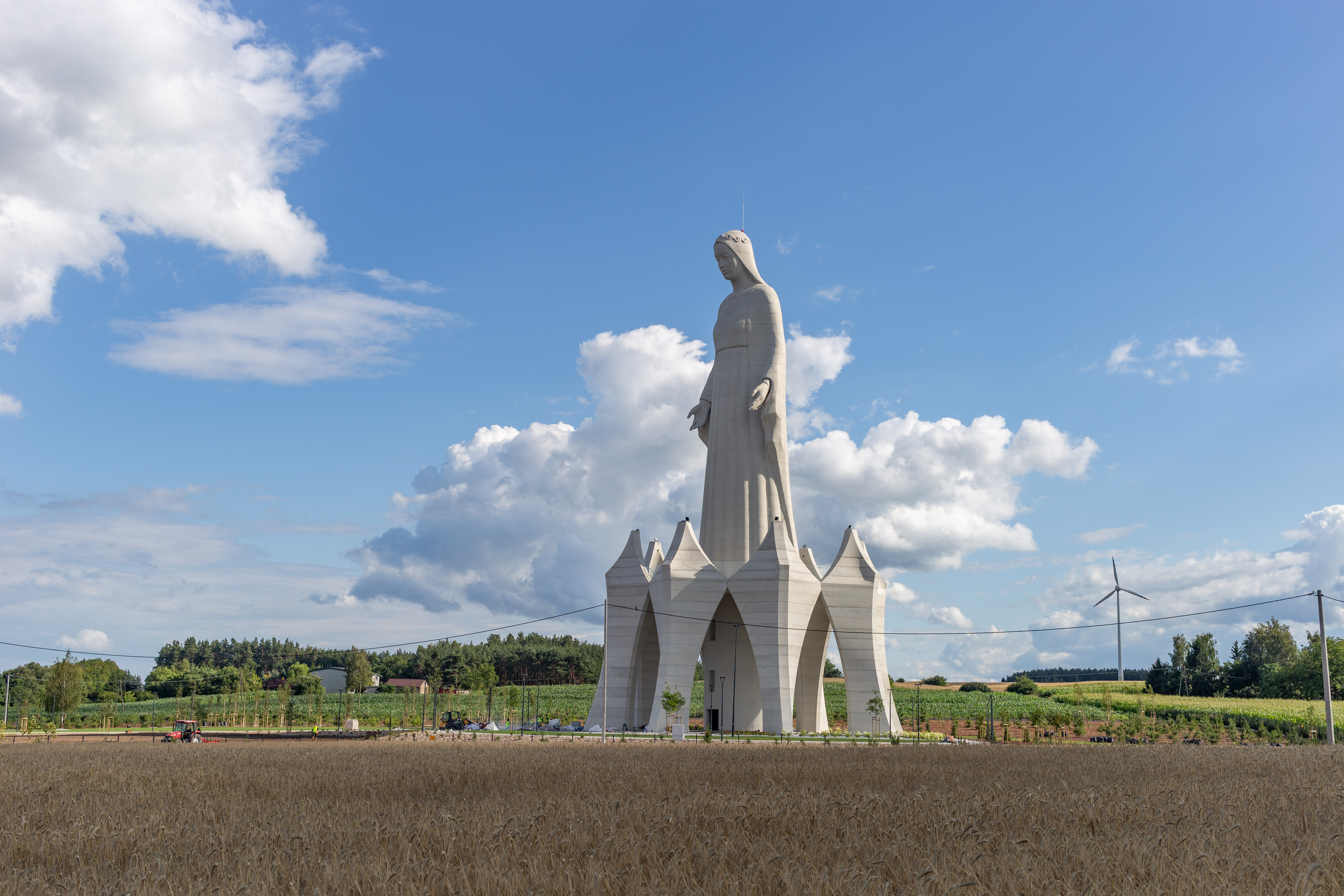
- The Our Lady of Mercy monument

- Location within Poland
- Coordinates: 52°53′N 19°6′E
- Country: Poland
- Voivodeship: Kuyavian-Pomeranian
- County: Lipno
- Gmina: Kikół

Konotopie [kɔnɔˈtɔpjɛ] is a village in the administrative district of Gmina Kikół, within Lipno County, Kuyavian-Pomeranian Voivodeship, in north-central Poland.

In March 2025, construction began on the Our Lady of Mercy monument, dedicated to the Virgin Mary, in the vicinity of the village. The structure, consecrated on 15 August 2026, is Europe's tallest statue of Mary (55 meters, 182 feet). The work was funded by millionaires living in the area.
