= Mariusz Wideryński =

Polish photographer (1951–2026

Mariusz Bogdan Wideryński (1951 – 15 March 2026) was a Polish photographer and academic.

== Life and career ==
Wideryński studied historical geology at the Institute of Geology at the Taras Shevchenko National University of Kyiv, in 2011, he defended his doctoral thesis. In 2019, he received the title of professor of art.

He later became a researcher at the Academy of Fine Arts in Warsaw.

Wideryński died on 15 March 2026.

== Awards ==
- In 2024, Wideryński was awarded the Silver Medal Gloria Artis Medal for Merit to Culture.
