= Semyon Skrepetsky =

Russian artist and satirist (1981–2026)

- Семён Скрепецкий
- Born: Robert Mubaryakovich Kuzovkov; 5 August 1981; Beloretsk, Bashkir ASSR, Russian SFSR, Soviet Union
- Died: 15 June 2026 (aged 44); Biała Podlaska, Lublin Voivodeship, Poland
- Other names: Simon Skrepecki, Robert Burdai, Skreponosny Buzoter, MC Screp
- Known for: Political caricature, satirical video blogging, performance art
- Notable work: Russia-2028
- Style: Neo-primitivism
- Movement: Political satire, political art
- Website: skrepetsky.art

Semyon Skrepetsky (Note: The spelling "Simon Skrepecki" follows the name of Skrepetsky's YouTube channel.) (Russian: Семён Скрепецкий, also rendered as Simon Skrepecki; born Robert Mubaryakovich Kuzovkov (Note: In this name that follows East Slavic naming customs, the patronymic is Mubaryakovich and the family name is Kuzovkov.) (Russian: Роберт Мубарякович Кузовков), also known as Robert Burdai and Skreponosny Buzotyor (Russian: Скрепоносный Бузотёр); 5 August 1981 – 15 June 2026) was a Russian artist, painter, caricaturist, performance artist, musician, blogger and satirist. He was known for political caricatures and satirical material critical of the authorities of the Russian Federation and Ukraine.

== Background ==
Skrepetsky was born in Russia in 1981. Until 2021 he lived in Altai Krai, after which he emigrated to Poland, fearing political persecution. English-language reporting also described him as having lived in exile in Poland since 2021. Before his death he lived in Biała Podlaska.

He used the pseudonym Simon Skrepecki, as well as Robert Burdai and Skreponosny Buzoter. He ran a satirical video blog on YouTube, combining artistic activity with political commentary on contemporary Russia. According to Fontanka.ru, he also recorded trap tracks under the pseudonym MC Screp.

== Work ==
Skrepetsky was known primarily for political caricatures and satirical paintings. His work was described as neo-primitivism, while the artist himself used the terms "psychedelia" and "skreprealism" for it.

His works included caricatures of Vladimir Putin, Ramzan Kadyrov, Adam Kadyrov, Patriarch Kirill of Moscow, Alexei Navalny and Yulia Navalnaya, Maxim Katz, the singer Shaman, Joseph Stalin and Alexander Lukashenko. His satirical paintings portrayed Putin, Kadyrov and other representatives of the Russian authorities. One of his best-known works reinterpreted a classical Orthodox icon, depicting Stalin cradling Putin in place of the Mother of God holding the infant Jesus. Associated Press described another image as showing Putin being cradled in the arms of Stalin.

His criticism was not limited to the Russian authorities. Russian-language and English-language sources reported that he also criticised parts of the Russian opposition and the authorities of Ukraine; in this context, his inclusion in the Myrotvorets database was noted. Myrotvorets accused him for activities like spreading Russian propaganda and discrediting the Armed Forces of Ukraine.

He was the author of the book Russia-2028.

== Public activity ==
Skrepetsky took part in political actions and demonstrations. In 2024 he participated in an anti-war demonstration in Berlin, during which he used a caricatured image of Alexei Navalny.

On 12 June 2026, Russia Day, he took part in an action in Berlin near the embassy of the Russian Federation. He appeared with a painting depicting Stalin and Putin and with a Russian flag, which he dragged on the ground or threw into a rubbish bin. Reuters described the Berlin action as a protest with an icon-like caricature of Stalin and Putin. According to Associated Press, on the Sunday before his death he posted a video on his YouTube channel showing him in Berlin putting a Russian flag in a rubbish bin during the 12 June action. According to The Moscow Times, a few hours before his death he wrote on Telegram about threats that had allegedly appeared after that action.

== Assassination ==
Skrepetsky was fatally shot in Biała Podlaska on 15 June 2026. According to the Prosecutor's Office in Lublin, the killing took place at about 9:45–9:50 a.m. in an internal car park and on a pavement near the victim's residence at 3 Królowej Jadwigi Street. The attacker fired two shots at him with a handgun; after Skrepetsky fell, the attacker approached him and fired three more shots before fleeing. The bullets hit Skrepetsky in the head, chest and back, and he died at the scene.

=== Investigation ===
During the inspection of the scene, investigators found seven gunshot wounds, including five entry wounds and two exit wounds, located in the head, chest and back. They secured five cartridge cases and one 9 mm Luger GEC bullet, as well as a mobile phone and money belonging to the victim.

After the incident, police detained two citizens of Belarus, aged 37 and 33, near the Belarusian consulate; their possible connection with the case was investigated by the authorities. Reuters reported that the two men had been detained but not charged. On 17 June 2026, district prosecutor's office spokesperson Marcin Kozak said that the two Belarusian citizens had been released after questioning as witnesses, because the evidence did not confirm their involvement and investigators found no link between them and the case. According to Reform.news, no other individuals had been detained in the investigation as of that statement. Kozak said that investigators were working with several theories and were analysing digital materials, surveillance-camera recordings and witness statements.

The prosecutor's office stated that at the early stage of the proceedings it would not provide detailed information about investigative hypotheses. Associated Press reported that Polish prosecutors had not officially attributed the killing to the Russian authorities. On 17 June 2026, Polish prime minister Donald Tusk said that the killing had the hallmarks of a political assassination, while also stating that investigators still needed evidence or more concrete indications. He said that if the killing had been ordered by Russia, it would constitute state terrorism. Tusk also said that Skrepetsky had been offered protection by Polish authorities but had refused it. Agence France-Presse, citing Polish government spokesman Adam Szłapka, also reported that Poland had offered Skrepetsky protection, which he declined.

A special investigative group of the Provincial Police Headquarters in Lublin was established in the case. Police appealed to witnesses and drivers with dashcam recordings from the area of Królowej Jadwigi, Terebelska, Sitnicka and Grunwaldzka streets, and national road No. 2, from 15 June 2026 between 8:30 and 10:30 a.m., to provide materials that could assist the investigation. Reuters reported that Jacek Dobrzyński, spokesperson for Poland's minister responsible for special services, said the Internal Security Agency had been cooperating closely with police and prosecutors on the case.

A suspect was arrested on June 18th and another suspect in November 2026.

=== Context ===
The case was reported in English-language media in the context of suspected politically motivated violence against Russian exiles and critics of the Kremlin, although Polish prosecutors had not formally attributed the killing to the Russian state. Freedom House defines transnational repression as governments reaching across borders to silence dissent among diasporas and exiles, including through assassinations, illegal deportations, abductions, digital threats, Interpol abuse and family intimidation. In the Journal of Democracy, Nate Schenkkan wrote that Freedom House data for 2014–2024 covered 1,219 direct physical incidents of transnational repression by 48 origin states in 103 host states. A January 2026 study requested by the European Parliament's Committee on Foreign Affairs, using primarily the Freedom House dataset, stated that Russia was the origin state with the highest number of such incidents inside the European Union and that Poland was the EU host state with the highest number of incidents in the dataset.

Scholarly work on satire in Putin-era Russia describes satirical protest as a field shaped by the limits of permitted humour, state and pro-state pressure, and counterstrategies of cultural resistance. The volume Satire and Protest in Putin's Russia examines satire on the internet, television and stage, as well as satirical protest in music, poetry, visual culture and public actions. In the same volume, Klavdia Smola's chapter on hybrid political humour discusses contemporary dissent art in Russia as a form combining political humour, artistic practice and protest.
