= Marek Trombski =

Polish politician and scientist (1937–2026)

Marek Stanisław Trombski (14 September 1937 – 16 March 2026) was a Polish politician and scientist.

== Life and career ==
Trombski was born in Łódź on 14 September 1937.

From 1973 to 1992, he headed the TUL Mechanical and Construction Institute. From 1973 to 1981 he was vice-dean of the Faculty of Mechanical Engineering, then until 1987 dean of the Faculty of Mechanical Engineering. From 1987 to 1993, he held the position of vice-rector of the Lodz University of Technology for the Bielsko-Biała Branch. From 2001 to 2008, he served as the rector of the Technical and Humanities Academy in Bielsko-Biała. In 2009, he became the rector of the Higher School of Occupational Safety Management in Katowice.

He also conducted political activities. In 1989, he unsuccessfully applied for a Senate seat. From 1994 to 1997, he served as the Voivode of Bielsko. From 1998 to 2006, he sat on the Silesian Regional Assembly—serving as its vice-chairman during the first term—having been elected from the lists of the Democratic Left Alliance. In 2005, he joined the Democratic Party; that same year, he ran unsuccessfully for the Senate on the party's ticket.

Trombski served as vice-president of the main board of the Association of Volunteer Fire Brigades of the Republic of Poland. He was a member of the Engineering Academy in Poland.

Trombski died on 16 March 2026, at the age of 88.

== Awards ==
- 1997: Knight's Cross, Officer's Cross.
