= Our Lady of Mercy monument, Konotopie =

Our Lady of Mercy monument
- Monument Matki Bożej Miłosiernej
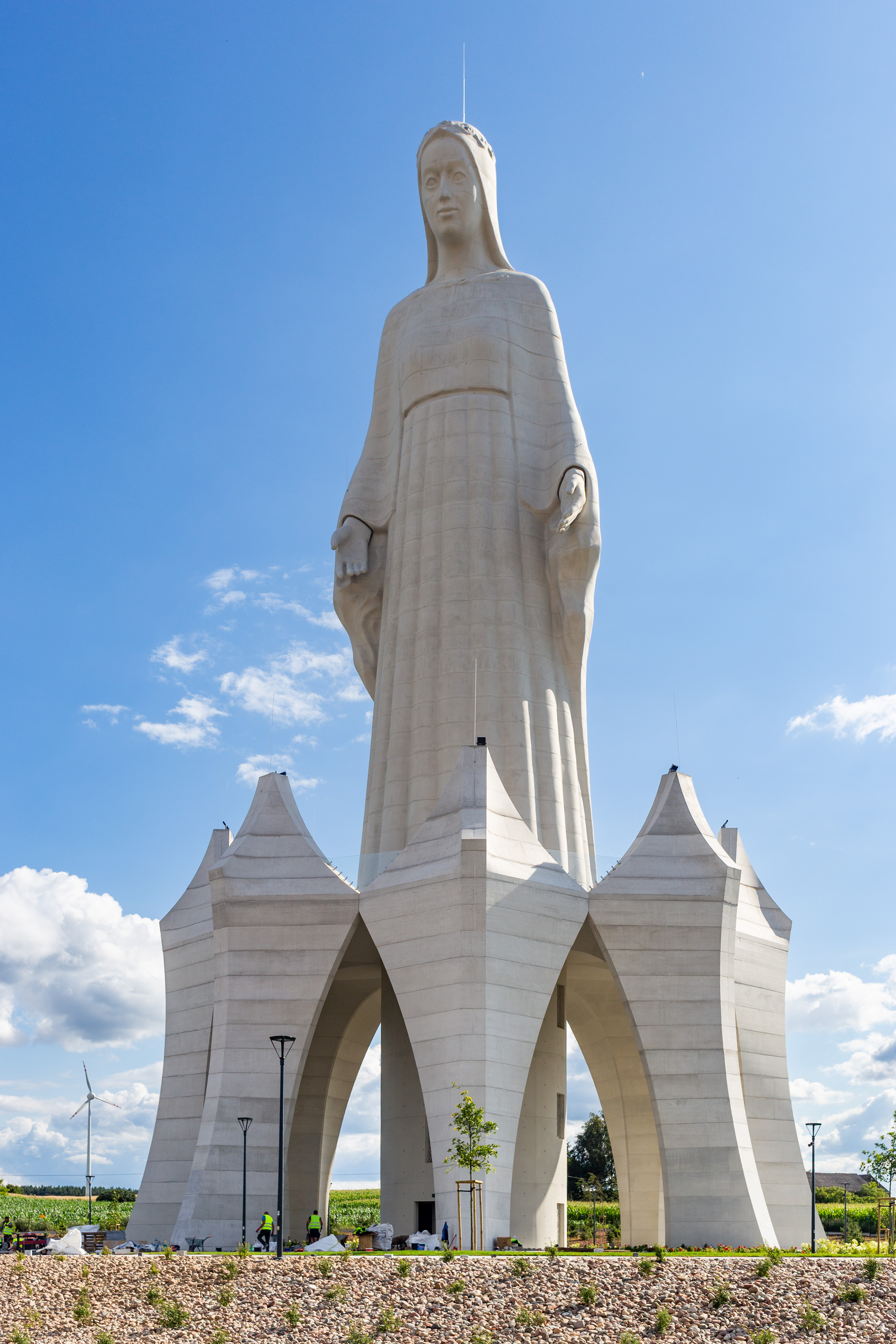
- Interactive map of Our Lady of Mercy monument
- Location: Konotopie, Poland
- Coordinates: 52°53′48″N 19°07′07″E
- Designer: Adam Jakub Matejkowski
- Type: Statue
- Height: 55.6 m (182 ft)
- Beginning date: 12 March 2025
- Dedicated date: 15 August 2026
- Dedicated to: Virgin Mary (Our Lady of Mercy)
- Website: matkaboska-konotopie.pl

The Our Lady of Mercy monument (Polish: Monument Matki Bożej Miłosiernej) in Konotopie, Poland, is a monument dedicated to the Virgin Mary under the Marian title Our Lady of Mercy. It is the tallest statue of Mary in Europe and tallest statue of any kind in the European Union.

== History ==
Businessman Roman Karkosik and his wife Grażyna commissioned the creation of a monument dedicated to Mary, mother of Jesus in the town of Konotopie, Poland. The Konotopie local government has been aware of plans for the statue as early as 2023. The ceremonial laying of the foundation was held on 12 March 2025 within the vicinity of the Sanctuary of Our Lady of Sorrows.

The monument dedicated to Mary, under the title "Our Lady of Mercy" was consecrated on 15 August 2026. It was blessed by Bishop Krzysztof Wętkowski. At the time of its completion, it is noted for being the tallest Marian statue in Europe.

== Design ==
Adam Jakub Matejkowski was the sculptor of the Our Lady of Mercy monument. He asked his students Krzysztof Skóra and Marek Purs to collaborate on him on the project. Matejkowski said he based the facial features of the statue on his wife and the expression on his 11-year-old daughter. It depicts the Virgin Mary standing with her gaze directed downward and her arms slightly outstretched in an inviting gesture.

It is the tallest statue of Mary in Europe at 55.6 meters (182 ft). The height includes a crown-shaped 15-meter (49 ft) pedestal. The Mother of All Asia – Tower of Peace in the Philippines is still the tallest Marian statue in the world at 98 meters (322 ft).
