= Bielawa Jezioro railway station =

Railway station in Bielawa, Poland

Bielawa Jezioro Bielawa Lake

General information
- Location: Bielawa, Lower Silesian Voivodeship; Poland
- Coordinates: 50°40′46.0″N 16°35′19.0″E
- Owner: Lower Silesian Road and Railway Authority in Wrocław
- Line: Dzierżoniów Śląski–Bielawa Góry Sowie
- Platforms: 1

History
- Opened: 14 June 2026
- Former names: Bielawa Camping Sudety (2024–2026)

Services
Preceding station	KD	Following station
Bielawa Zachodnia towards Wrocław Główny	D4	Bielawa Góry Sowie Terminus
Bielawa Zachodnia towards Wrocław Główny	D40	Bielawa Góry Sowie Terminus
Location
- Location within Poland Location within Lower Silesian Voivodeship

Bielawa Jezioro (lit. 'Bielawa Lake') is a railway station on the Dzierżoniów Śląski–Bielawa Góry Sowie railway in the town of Bielawa, Dzierżoniów County within the Lower Silesian Voivodeship in south-western Poland.

== History ==
During the planning stages of the revitalisation of the Dzierżoniów Śląski–Bielawa Góry Sowie railway, Gmina Bielawa proposed a new station to be built, Bielawa Camping Sudety, serving the nearby Bielawa Lake. The proposal was approved. In February 2026, the Lower Silesian Road and Railway Authority in Wrocław (DSDiK) raised concerns over the name of the station, saying it's "too-pro tourist", and as a result may not be approved by Polish State Railways, leading to the station not being opened as scheduled in June. DSDiK renamed the station was renamed to Bielawa Jezioro on 16 February.

Bielawa Jezioro, alongside Bielawa Góry Sowie opened on 14 June. Passenger services are operated by Lower Silesian Railways.

== Train services ==
The station is served by the following services:

- Regional services (KD) Wrocław - Jaworzyna Śląska - Świdnica - Bielawa Góry Sowie
