= Bartłomiej Kubkowski =

Polish marathon swimmer (born 1995)

Personal information
- Born: 1995 (age 30–31) Giżycko, Poland

Sport
- Country: Poland
- Sport: Swimming
- Events: Marathon swimming, ice swimming
- Club: Medyk Giżycko, Śląsk Wrocław, Kormoran Olsztyn, AZS UWM Olsztyn

Bartłomiej Kubkowski (born 1995) is a Polish marathon swimmer. In 2026, he became the first person ever to swim across the Baltic Sea, a distance of over 160 kilometres (86 nmi).

== Biography ==
Kubkowski was born in 1995 in Giżycko, Poland. He began swimming at age four and was nicknamed Foka ('The Seal'). At the age of 16, he moved to Wrocław to attend the Szkoła Mistrzostwa Sportowego (Sports Championship School), as the city had better swimming facilities. He lived there for four years and later lived in Gdańsk and Koszalin.

Kubkowski began his career with the local club Medyk Giżycko and was later a member of Śląsk Wrocław, Kormoran Olsztyn, and AZS UWM Olsztyn. Originally a competitive pool swimmer, he later switched to open water swimming. In total, across pool and open water events, Kubkowski won 40 medals at Polish championships. He also competed at the European and World Cups.

In 2021, Kubkowski announced his plan to become the first person to swim across the Baltic Sea, a distance of over 160 kilometres (86 nmi). The challenge was named the "Ultra Baltic Swim". He spent a year training in preparation, swimming up to six hours each day. In August 2022, he made his first attempt, with a goal of swimming from Kołobrzeg, Poland, to Ystad, Sweden. Under marathon swimming rules, Kubkowski had to swim nonstop, without sleep. An accompanying boat provided him with water and food on a pole, although he could not touch the boat. He swam for 32 hours on his first attempt, covering a distance of 115 kilometres (62 nmi), but had to stop due to unfavorable weather conditions. Although unsuccessful, his swim raised PLN 110,000 for the Cancer Fighters Foundation.

After his first attempt, Kubkowski announced that he was going to attempt the swim again in 2023. Starting in Löderup, Sweden, with a goal of Kołobrzeg, he managed to swim for 40 hours in 2023 but once again had to stop before completion, raising over PLN 280,000 for the Cancer Fighters. He attempted the swim for the third time in August 2024, starting in Mrzeżyno. Kubkowski swam over 70 kilometres (38 nmi) in nearly 19 hours, but stopped due to seasickness. In January 2025, he set a world record by swimming 103.58 kilometres (64.36 mi) in a 25-metre (82 ft) pool in 24 hours. Kubkowski made his fourth attempt at crossing the Baltic Sea in August 2025, starting in Kåseberga, Sweden. He swam for over 55 hours, traveling 159 kilometres (86 nmi), before falling unconscious and being pulled onto the boat by his team, around 11 kilometres (5.9 nmi) short of reaching Poland.

Kubkowski decided to make a fifth attempt at crossing in August 2026. Starting in Kåseberga, Sweden and ending in Dziwnów, Poland, he swam for 56 hours and covered 160 kilometres (86 nmi), successfully completing the swim. He is the first person ever to do so. It was the second longest continuous open water swim of all time, behind Sarah Thomas, who posted the world record in Lake Champlain. His final attempt raised almost to PLN 800,000 for charity.

Kubkowski has also competed in ice swimming and won three silver medals at the world championships. Outside of swimming himself, he gives private lessons and has trained in martial arts.
