= Andrzej Gąsienica-Józkowy =

Polish mountain rescuer (1946–2026)

Andrzej Gąsienica-Józkowy (1946 – 1 March 2026) was a Polish mountain rescuer.

== Life and career ==
Gąsienica-Józkowy was born in Zakopane in 1946. In 1969, he became a candidate for a rescuer of the Tatra Group GOPR, and in 1970 he took the oath and became a rescuer. He worked in mountain rescue for 40 years. During this time, he took part in 463 rescue expeditions and 440 interventions in ski accidents. After his retirement in 2010, he was honored with the title of lifetime member of TOPR.

Gąsienica-Józkowy died on 1 March 2026.

== Awards ==
- Officer's Cross of the Order of Polonia Restituta.
