= Katowice–Legnica railway =

Railway line in Poland

Sudeten Main Line
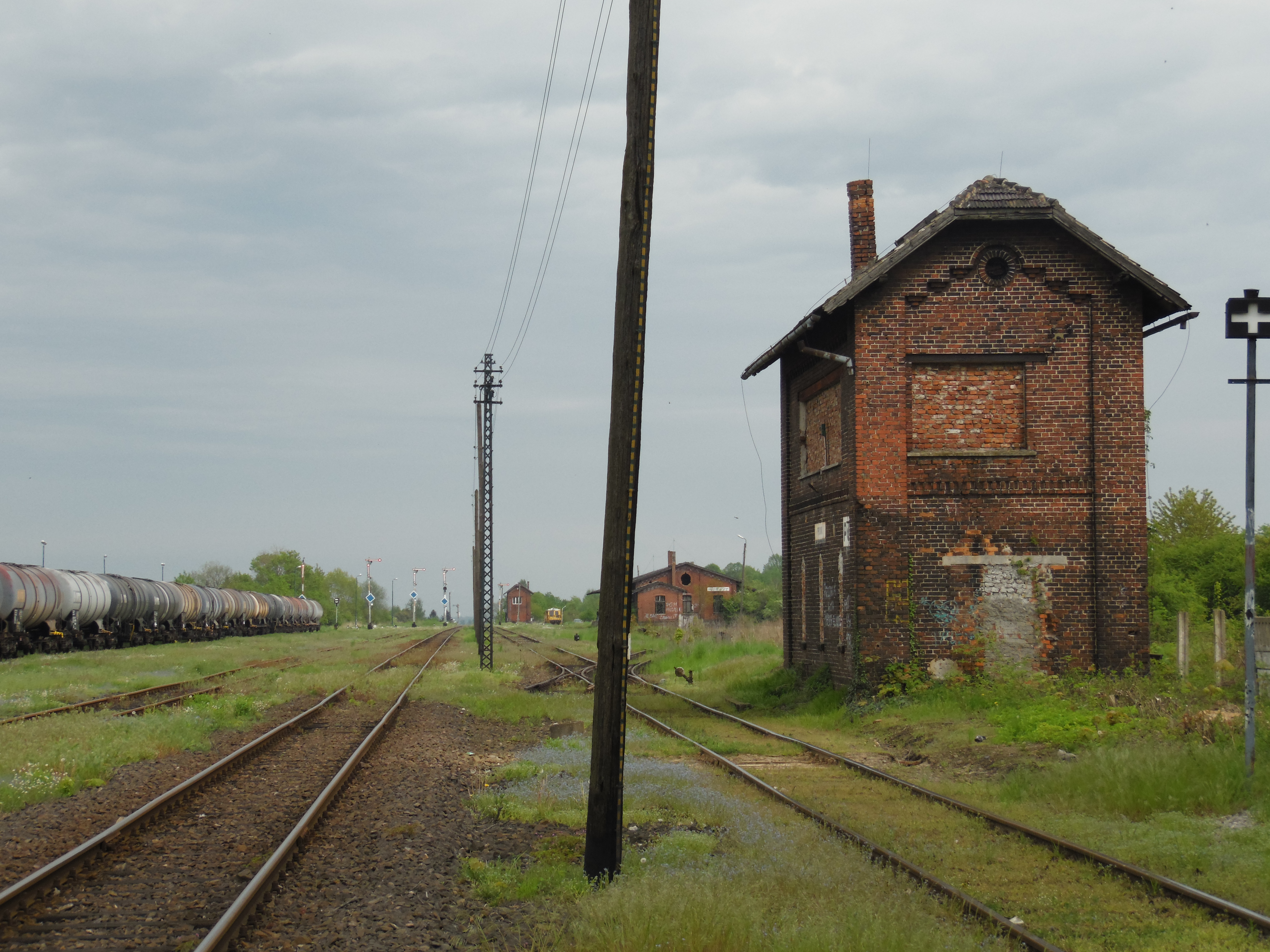
- Sudeten main line in Prudnik. View of the railway towards Kędzierzyn-Koźle, on the right is a disused signal box

Overview
- Native name: Polish: Magistrala Podsudecka
- Status: Operational
- Owner: PKP PLK
- Line number: 137
- Locale: Poland
- Termini: Katowice; Legnica
- Connecting lines: See connecting lines
- Stations: 47

Service
- Type: Heavy rail
- Operator(s): PKP Intercity; Polregio; Lower Silesian Railways; Silesian Railways; PKP Cargo; Private railway companies

History
- Work began: 1844
- Opened: 21 July 1844
- Last extension: 15 August 1876
- Completed: 1876

Technical
- Line length: 284.1 km (176.5 mi)
- Num of tracks: Single and Dual track
- Track gauge: 1,435 mm (4 ft 8 1/2 in) standard gauge
- Electrification: Partly, 3 kV DC
- Operating speed: 50 to 120 km/h (31 to 75 mph)
Route map

The Katowice–Legnica railway, also known as the Sudeten Main Line (Polish: Magistrala Podsudecka) is a 284.1 km (176.5 mi) long partly electrified mainline in Poland, connecting both cities of Katowice and Legnica. The railway is located within the borders of the Silesian, Opole, and Lower Silesian voivodeships, within the operational areas of the PKP PLK railway line units in Sosnowiec, Tarnowskie Góry, Opole, Wałbrzych, and Wrocław. The railway follows the Sudetes mountain range alongside stretching from Prudnik to Legnica, hence giving the name Sudeten Main Line.

The railway was built and opened in sections between 1844 and 1876. It provided a connection between the industrialized settlements of the Sudeten Foreland and the mines of Upper Silesia. Prior to nationalization of the railways, the railway was owned entirely by Upper Silesian Railway. From its inception, it was classified as a first-rate railway of major national importance.

The railway used to be numbered 74 according to D29 from 1949, the number changed to 103 in 1971, and changed to the current number 137 in 1985 where its current number is still being used today.

== Route ==
=== Geography ===
The line starts at Katowice railway station at Środmieście in Katowice on the end point of the Warsaw–Katowice railway and the Oświęcim–Katowice railway, it heads west passing Katowice Załęże, Chorzów Batory, Świętochołcice, Ruda Śląska, Zabrze and Gliwice. From there, it continues through Gliwice Łabędy to Kędzierzyn-Koźle, where the Kędzierzyn-Koźle–Opole Groszowice railway begins.

The line still heads east passing Kędzierzyn Koźle Przystanek, Kędzierzyn Koźle Zachodnie, Głogówek, Racławice Śląskie and to Prudnik, where the Krapkowice–Prudnik railway ends. Next it runs through Nowy Świętów, Nysa, Otmuchów, Paczków and to Kamieniec Ząbkowicki where it crosses the Wrocław–Międzylesie railway.

From there, the line heads north through Ząbkowice Śląskie, Piława Górna, Dzierżoniów Śląski, Świdnica Miasto, Jaworzyna Śląska, where it crosses with line Wrocław Świebodzki–Zgorzelec railway, Strzegom, and Jawor. The line ends at Legnica railway station, where it connects with Wrocław Muchobór–Gubinek railway.

=== Sections ===
The line is divided into 16 sections

- A: Katowice – Chorzów Batory (0,070 to 6,166)
- B: Chorzów Batory – Gliwice (6,166 to 27,100)
- C: Gliwice – Szobiszowice (27,100 to 28,530)
- D: Szobiszowice – Gliwice Łabędy (28,530 to 32,985)
- E: Gliwice Łabędy – Rudziniec Gliwicki (32,985 to 49,056)
- F: Rudziniec Gliwicki – Nowa Wieś (49,056 to 61,623)
- G: Nowa Wieś – Kędzierzyn-Koźle (61,623 to 64,162)
- H: Kędzierzyn-Koźle – Kędzierzyn-Koźle Zachodnie (64,162 to 70,150)
- J: Kędzierzyn-Koźle Zachodnie – Prudnik (70,150 to 111,696)
- K: Prudnik – Nysa (111,696 to 139,075)
- L: Nysa – Kamieniec Ząbkowicki (139,075 to 177,219)
- M: Kamieniec Ząbkowicki – Świdnica Miasto (177,219 to 226,796)
- N: Świdnica Miasto – Jaworzyna Śląska (226,796 to 236,765)
- O: Jaworzyna Śląska – Strzegom (236,765 to 247,227)
- P: Strzegom – Jawor (247,227 to 262,333)
- R: Jawor – Legnica (262,333 to 284,190)

=== Connecting lines ===
Operational

- Warszawa Zachodnia–Katowice railway
- Oświęcim–Katowice railway
- Katowice –Zwardoń railway
- Chorzów Batory–Tczew railway
- Ruda Chebzie–Zabrze Biskupice railway
- Zabrze Biskupice–Gliwice railway
- Katowice Ligota–Gliwice railway
- Gliwice Łabędy–Pyskowice railway
- Toszek–Rudziniec Gliwicki railway
- Kędzierzyn-Koźle–Chałupki railway
- Kędzierzyn Koźle–Opole railway
- Krapkowice–Prudnik railway
- Nowy Świętów–Głuchołazy railway
- Opole–Nysa railway
- Nysa–Brzeg railway
- Wrocław–Międzylesie railway
- Bielawa–Dzierżoniów railway
- Wrocław–Jedlina Zdrój railway
- Wrocłąw Świebodzki–Zgorzelec railway
- Wielkie Piekary–Miłkowice railway
- Wrocław–Gubinek railway

Partly operational

- Malczyce–Grabina railway
- Jawor–Roztoka railway

Defunct

- Polska Cerekiew–Baborów railway
- Głubczyce–Racławice Śląskie railway
- Nowy Świętów–Sławniowice Nyskie railway
- Nysa–Kałków Łąka railway
- Nysa–Ścinawa Mała railway
- Otmuchów–Dziewiętlice railway
- Otmuchów–Przeworno railway
- Kamieniec Ząbkowicki–Złoty Stok railway
- Malczyce–Jawor railway

Under reconstruction

- Kobierzyce–Piława Górna railway

=== Minor railway lines ===
Katowice–Chorzów Batory line

The Katowice–Chorzów Batory railway line is a short electrified strip of railway connecting Katowice and Chorzów Batory located next to Katowice–Legnica mainline. It measures 4.5 km (2.8 mi) in length, it has a 3 kV DC electrification and its maximum operating speed is 50 km/h (31 mph). The line is numbered as 713 and is owned by PKP PLK.

Katowice–Brynów line

The Katowice–Brynów railway line is a short electrified strip of railway connecting Katowice and Katowice Brynów. It measures 3 km (1.9 mi) in length, it has a 3 kV DC electrification and its maximum operating speed is 80 km/h (50 mph). The line is numbered as 656 and is owned by PKP PLK. It was built in 1965 and electrified a year later.

== History ==
=== 19th century ===
==== Jaworzyna Śląska – Świdnica section ====
Świdnica Miasto railway station in 1905, the previous station was located next to the former fortress boundary.

In 1841, plans were underway in Silesia to build additional connections, including from Legnica through Jawor, Strzegom, Świdnica, and Dzierżoniów to Ząbkowice Śląskie, from where two branches were to extend: through Kłodzko and Międzylesie to the Czech lands (Austria) and through Nysa to Koźle. In order to avoid the delay of the line construction due to the resistance of the Świdnica military authorities, it was decided to route it to Świebodzice, hoping that over time the fortress command would change its position. Difficult "military" negotiations continued and intensified significantly in 1843, when there was already an argument in hand in the form of an almost completed line to Świebodzice. Ultimately, in November 1843, after the first section of the line had already been commissioned, the authorities of the Wrocław Regency were presented with a compromise project, which outlined, among other things, the route of the line, the location of the terminal station in Świdnica (also a dead-end), and the planned opening date of the line. On 21 July 1844, the Jaworzyna Śląska–Świdnica was officially opened.

The branch from Jaworzyna Śląska was laid perpendicular to the main line in a south-eastern direction. After leaving the station, the tracks led in a gentle curve to the right. About 1,300 metres (4,300 ft) from the junction, they crossed the old coal road Ciernie — Kąty almost at a right angle, after which they ran straight for 7.4 kilometres (4.6 mi) to the terminal station in Świdnica. By constructing several embankments and cuttings, it was possible to lay the line almost "as on a table." From 233 metres (764 ft) above sea level in Jaworzyna Śląska to 231 metres (758 ft) above sea level in Świdnica. The deepest and longest cuttings were created north of Bolesławice and west of Tomkowa, while the highest embankments, along with water culverts, were at the points where the line crossed the Bagieniecka River and its tributary, as well as the Jabłoniec. Between the two towns, there was no intermediate station, although the line passed just west of Bolesławice and just east of Tomkowa. The length of this single-track line was nearly 9 kilometres (5.6 mi), and the terminal station in Świdnica was located right at the fortress boundary.

==== Świdnica – Dzierżoniów section ====
In 1848, despite the unfavorable social-economic situation, discussions about extending the line from Świdnica to Austria resumed. At that time, a favorable tendering circumstance was the emergence of plans to build a line from Berlin to Vienna via Zgorzelec and Liberec, essentially bypassing Silesia. Nevertheless, there were difficulties in obtaining full authorization to build the entire route. Therefore, it was decided to carry out the project in stages. In order to finally make progress, it was decided to build the Świdnica — Dzierżoniów section.

The concession was obtained in September 1852, and the work was commenced. At that time, the very difficult fieldwork was undertaken, which the construction of a stretch of over 18 km (11 mi) (twice as long as from Jaworzyna Śląska to Świdnica) lasted as long as three years. This was primarily due to the difficulties in penetrating the area of the Świdnica fortress, as well as the necessity of constructing several viaducts over the Bystrzyca, Pisarzowice, and Witoszów streams, as well as the inconspicuous Wapienniczka. However, it was not necessary to build a viaduct over the Piława, as by slightly diverging the route near Opoczka, it was simply bypassed (otherwise, as many as two bridges would have been needed). The further section of the line was almost straight.

The greatest problem, not only technical but also financial, was the fortress. The company was willing to route the line at a certain distance from it, just to be able to start operations, but ultimately it agreed to the conditions set by the military authorities. It costed them 350,000 talers, as that was the amount required to meet the fortress's security requirements. They were as follows:

- Over Wapienniczka (German: Kaslkriune) and the Witoszów Stream (German: Bögenwasser), two easily destructible viaducts were to be erected, the first of which was to have 34 spans and the second 20 spans;
- A distance of 50 feet is to be maintained between the pillars;
- The substructure was to be made of iron;
- At the point where the railway line enters the fortress area, a bridge with an iron superstructure was to be constructed. A second identical bridge was to be built at the point where the railway leaves the fortress.

The requests of the military were more justified due to the concerns (similar to those regarding other fortresses) about the possibility of the fortress being torn down for the construction of a railway. These concerns were not unfounded, which is the reason the measures were sought by constructing viaducts that could serve the function of former drawbridges, after their possible dismantling or demolition. The political situation at that time was not stable, and the strength of the fortress continued to be trusted for several more decades.

The extension of the line from Świdnica to Dzierżoniów involved abandoning the final section of the line, which was exactly 1 km (0.62 mi) long, and relocating the station to another site. This disrupted the previously straight course of the line and also caused a vertical shift, as the location for the new station was at an elevation of 238 m (781 ft) above sea level, that is 7 meters higher. The most convenient solution was to construct an embankment and lay the tracks on it, but this would have been contrary to the demands of the fortress authorities. Therefore, a different approach was taken.

It was chosen at a location situated at an elevation of 235 m (771 ft) above sea level and located at the old station. The line ran in a shallow cut, overcoming the gentle slope of a hill with an elevation of 238 m (781 ft) above sea level (this cut ended precisely). To maintain elevation and level the route, an embankment began to be constructed, which after 250 m (820 ft) transitioned into a viaduct. At its beginning, on the western side of the track, a gatekeeper's house was erected.

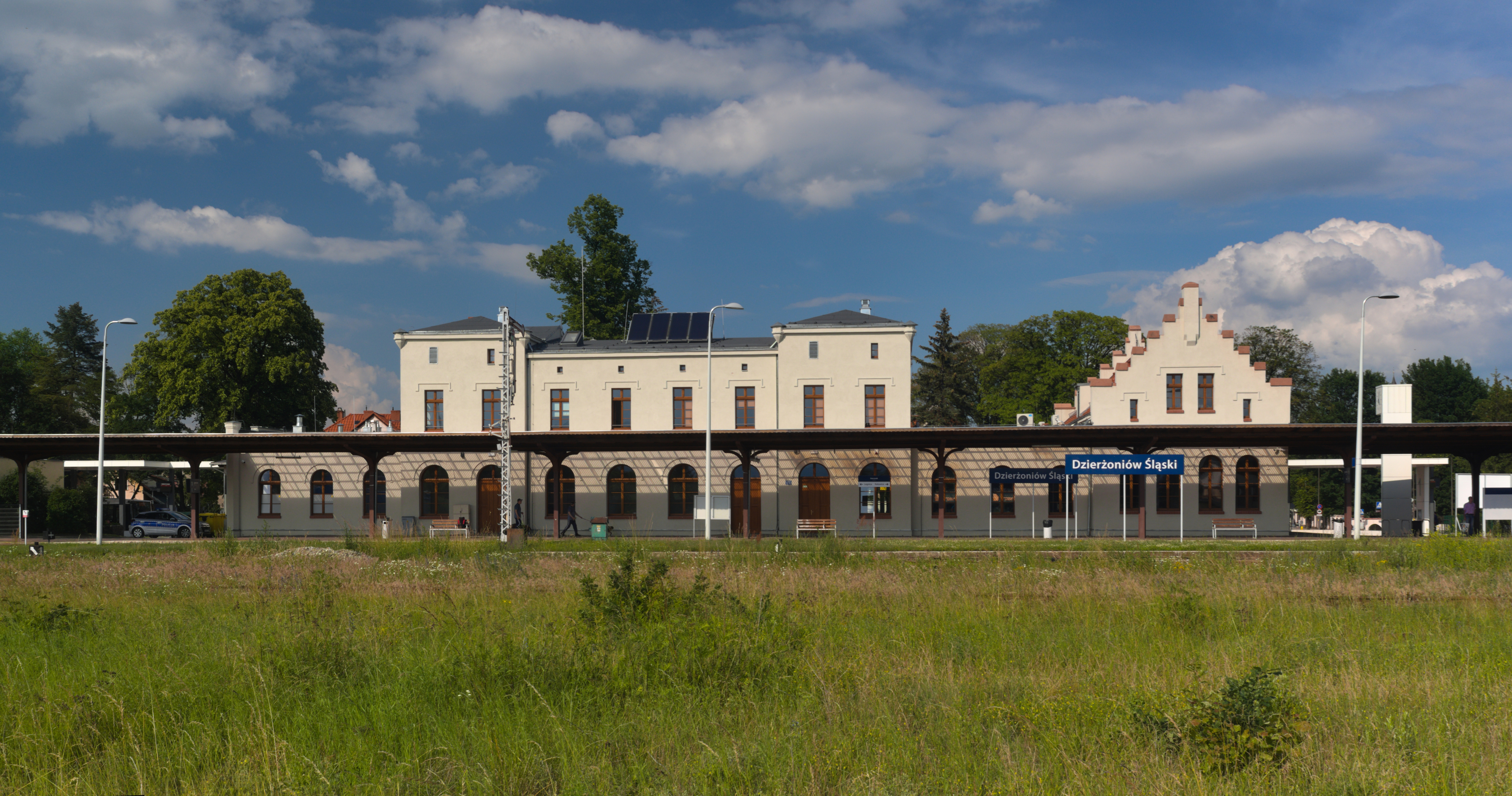
Dzierżoniów Śląski railway station in 2020, the station sits 800 meters from the town square.

After passing the viaduct, the line cut into a short embankment down to the level of the fortifications, ruthlessly separating its western section from the whole. Outside the line remained: Javornik hangard, Javornik flash, garden pavilion, garden fort, and the brick flash. Upon leaving the fortress area, the line ran along an embankment to the next viaduct, then in a slight curve, bypassed the village of Kraszowice and led straight in the direction of Opoczka. There it shifted again, after which it ran along the Piława River all the way to Dzierżoniów. Numerous irregularities in this area were leveled even by fairly high embankments and deep excavations. This route ran between Opoczka and Makowice, and then through Krzyżowa and Mościsko, steadily, though slightly, ascending. The railway station in Dzierżoniów was located approximately 800 m (2,600 ft) from the town square in the southwestern part of the town at an elevation of 260 m (850 ft) above sea level. The entire route measured 18.8 km (11.7 mi). The railway section was opened for passenger traffic on 24 November 1855. Freight trains did not operate on it until the following year.

==== Jaworzyna Śląska – Legnica section ====
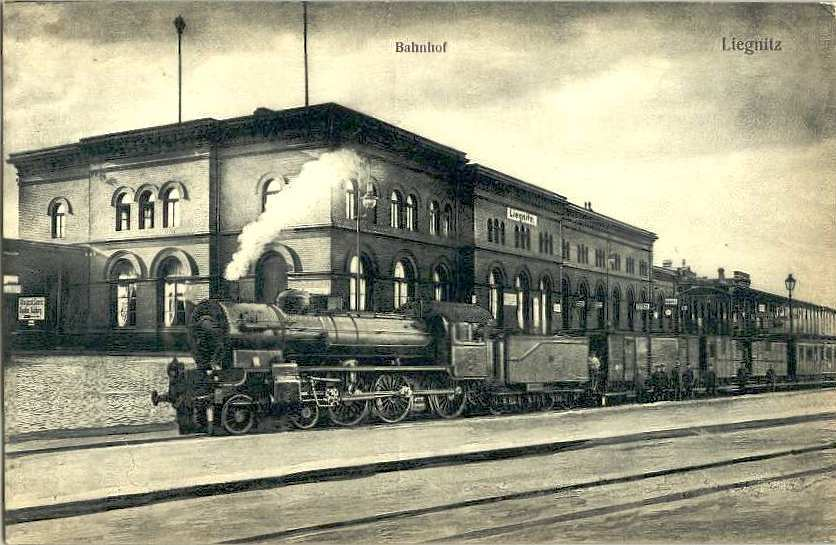
Legnica railway station in 1915, the station shared both railway lines of the Lower Silesian–Marcher Railway and the Wrocław–Świdnica–Świebodzice Railway.

The feasibility of connecting Legnica with Świdnica via Jaworzyna Śląska was recognized in the context of the intention to extend the line through Ząbkowice Śląskie and Kłodzko to the border in order to achieve the shortest possible connection with the Austrian railways. Based on the 1841 project (which envisaged the construction of the route at a cost of 7.75 million thalers), the attempts to obtain a concession were already undertaken in the spring of 1843, hoping for support from the state. Unfortunately, a royal decree issued on 24 May 1844, which prohibited the announcement of further subscriptions for shares of railway companies, posed an obstacle. Nonetheless, project work was not neglected.

In 1844, another planned route from Jaworzyna Śląska to Legnica was drawn up by a senior engineer Cochius. The concept for the construction of the line was received on 19 August 1854, and the construction immediately began. According to Cochius's plans, it ran through Strzegom and Jawor, to connect with the Lower Silesian–Marcher Railway in Legnica. On 16 December 1865, the railway section was opened.

From the station in Jaworzyna Śląska, the tracks were directed with a gentle curve to the northwest along the Pełcznica valley, and from the station in Stanowice in a straight line all the way to Strzegom. Along the way, two bridges were built over the Pełcznica and Strzegomka rivers. The railway station in Strzegom was located far outside the town (about 2 km (1.2 mi) from the town square), along the road to Jaroszów. The line then ran almost straight through Rogoźnica to Jawor, where the station was also situated away from the center. After the Stary Jawor station, the tracks shifted north and, through Brachów and Nowa Wieś Legnicka, reached Legnica, where at the Lower Silesian–Marcher Railway Station they connected with the Berlin–Wrocław line.

==== Dzierżoniów – Ząbkowice Śląskie section ====
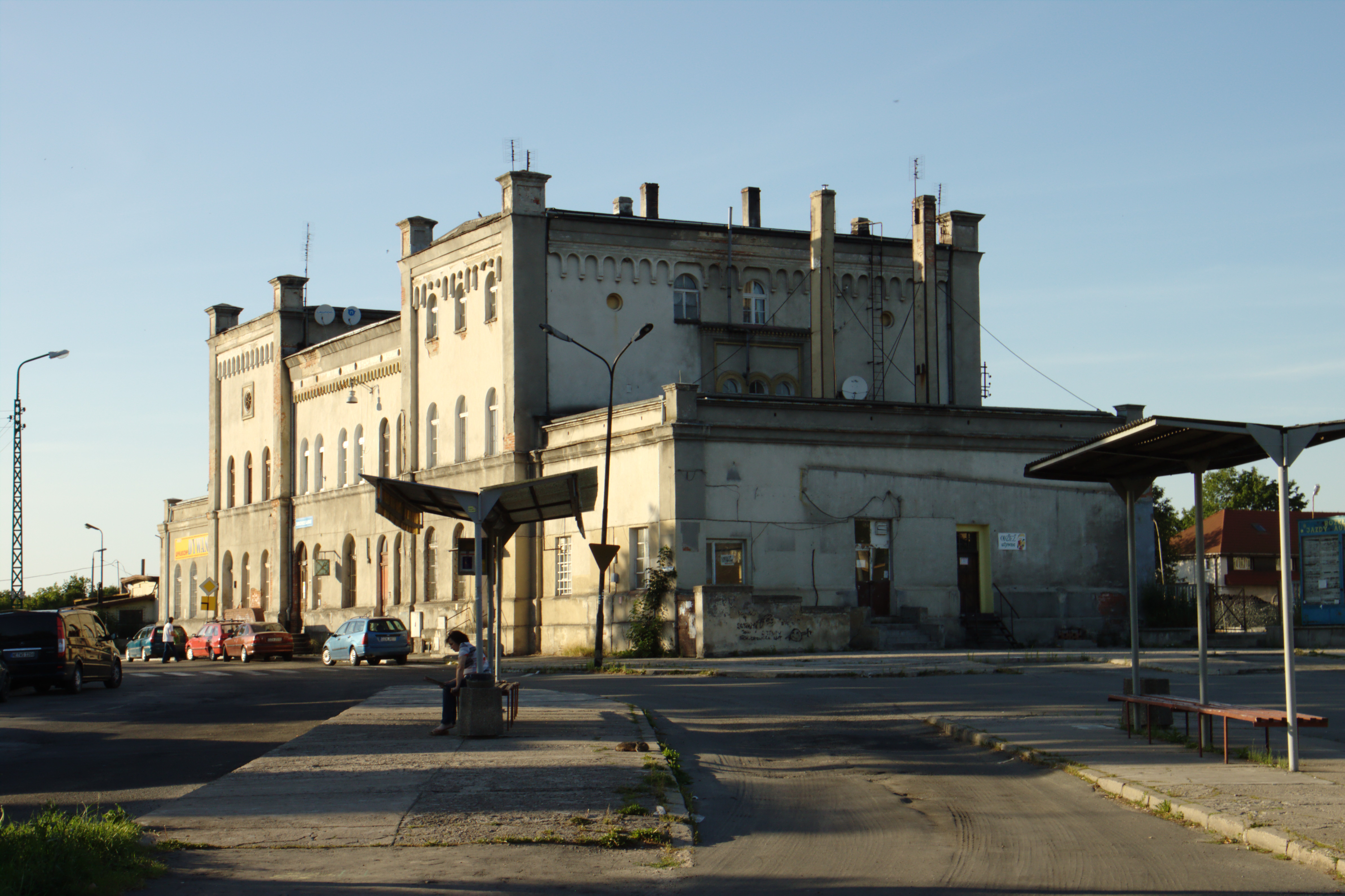
Ząbkowice Śląskie railway station in 2013, this station served as a terminus of the Legnica–Jaworzyna Śląska–Ząbkowice section for 16 years.

The Legnica–Jaworzyna Śląska–Świdnica–Dzierżoniów line was to be originally extended south, through Ząbkowice Śląskie, Kłodzko, and Międzylesie to Austria. Due to many economic and political reasons, the plan was delayed for several decades. Thus, the work on the northern route resulted in the Legnica–Lubin line being commissioned only on 25 December 1869, and subsequent sections were put into service in the 1870s. The situation was similar on the southern route, where after changes in plans, the subsequent lines were completed between 1873 and 1876, although they were no longer built by the Wrocław–Świdnica–Świebodzice Railway, but by the Upper Silesian Railway, which obtained a concession to continue the route in a considerably modified form.

Meanwhile, the construction did not stop at the section to Dzierżoniów, and in 1856, the plans for further extension of the line through Piława Górna to Ząbkowice was approved. It was to measure 21.9 km (13.6 mi), but it was being built in a more difficult terrain, which likely extended its construction time to two years. Unlike the relatively easy section from Jaworzyna Śląska to Jawor (where the widely divided Strzegom Hills did not pose a significant obstacle), it was necessary to contend with the denser Niemcza Hills.

The route was laid out in several straight sections, essentially bypassing all the settlements along the way, namely Piława Dolna, Piława Górna, Kluczowa, Brodziszów, and Zwrócona. Only one intermediate station was built in Piława Górna at the eastern end of the town. The highest elevations of approximately 320–330 metres (1,050–1,080 ft) above sea level were reached by the line in the excavation below the Gilowskie Hills and to the west of Brodziszów. The terminal station in Ząbkowice Śląskie was situated at an elevation of approximately 285 metres (935 ft) above sea level. The construction work was completed in August, and the formal opening of the line took place on 1 November 1858.

Due to distinguishing views on the further course of the route, the construction continuation was suspended. For the next 16 years, the Ząbkowice station remained as a terminus. The traffic on the construction of railway lines running along and across the Sudetes was to begin for another seven years. In the meantime, the terminal station in Ząbkowice could serve only as a convenient starting point for further travel by horse-drawn carriages into the Kłodzko Valley.

The opening of the section to Ząbkowice Śląskie marked the completion of the second stage of development of the Wrocław–Świdnica–Świebodzice Railway network. While in the first stage in the 1840s, 67.3 km (41.8 mi) of railway lines were constructed (Wrocław—Świebodzice—Świdnica), in the second stage as much as 105.3 km (65.4 mi) were built (extension to Wałbrzych, Legnica, and Ząbkowice Śląskie). 172.6 km (107.2 mi) in total of railway lines were therefore constructed. The third stage was not scheduled until between 1869 and 1878.

Ząbkowice gained somewhat a greater significance after the launch of the Legnica–Lubin line and further through Rudna, Głogów, Nowa Sól, and Zielona Góra to the junction station in Czerwieńsk (at the intersection with the Gubin–Poznań route), where the railway reached on 1 October 1871, thus at the beginning of the third stage of development of the Wrocław–Świdnica–Świebodzice Railway network. On the occasion of the opening of this route, a train timetable was issued, which included direct trains running from Ząbkowice Śląskie through Dzierżoniów, Świdnica, Jaworzyna Śląska, Strzegom, Jawor, Legnica, Lubin, Głogów, and Zielona Góra to Czerwieńsk. The route measured 225 km (140 mi), and the journey along it took from 6 to 7.5 hours. This gave an average travel speed of approximately 35 km/h (22 mph).

Nevertheless, Ząbkowice still remained as a terminal station, and hopes for changing this situation were placed in plans to expand the line towards Upper Silesia and to build a line from Wrocław to Kłodzko. It was expected that these routes would intersect precisely in Ząbkowice Śląskie, but things turned out differently.

==== Establishment of the Sudeten Main Line ====
The efforts to extend the Wrocław–Świdnica–Świebodzice railway line beyond Ząbkowice Śląskie broke down. The political factors and the government's favoritism towards the Upper Silesian Railway, eventually came under the state administration and obtained the long-awaited concession for the construction of two very important routes: from Wrocław through Kłodzko to Austria, and from Ząbkowice Śląskie eastward to connect with the Wilhelm Railway in Głubczyce, also influenced the outcome. This became possible after the conclusion of international negotiations with Austria, which agreed to open several border crossings, including in Międzylesie, as well as a change in perspective by the military authorities, who had previously hindered or prevented the construction of railway lines near important fortresses such as Kłodzko, Nysa, or Koźle.

Kamieniec Ząbkowicki railway station in 2025, this station was built in 1873 before becoming a junction station in 1874, it was operated by the Upper Silesian Railway. Since 3 November 1900, after the construction of the Kamieniec Ząbkowicki–Złoty Stok railway, it became a five-directional junction station.

After several decades of stagnation, the southern branch of the Wrocław–Świdnica–Świebodzice Railway was to be extended, but no longer directly to Kłodzko, rather in connection with the newly constructed line from Wrocław and by a competing railway company, Upper Silesian Railway. The company was already strong enough that it even absorbed two smaller companies: the Wilhelm Railway and the Brzeg–Nysa Railway on 1 January 1870. The greatest disadvantage fell upon Ząbkowice Śląskie, which had hoped to assume the role of an important junction station. It was decided that an entirely separate junction would be constructed, similar to Jaworzyna Śląska. The location chosen for this was the area between Goleniów Śląski and Kamieniec Ząbkowicki.

Under the concession of 7 July 1869, the Upper Silesian Railway began constructing a line from Wrocław southwards through Strzelin (1871), Ziębice (1872), Kamieniec Ząbkowicki (1873), and Kłodzko (1874) to Międzylesie (1875). Simultaneously, the work began on the line from Ząbkowice Śląskie eastwards. As of 1 April 1874 after 16 years, the Ząbkowice station was no longer a terminus, as the long-awaited connection to Kamieniec Ząbkowicki was inaugurated. Later the same year on 28 December, the line was extended to Goświnowice between Otmuchów and Nysa. Since work was ongoing along the entire length of the line, by 1 November 1875, the section from Nysa through Nowy Świętów to Głuchołazy was opened, and a month later, after the extension through Pokrzywna, it connected with the Austrian railways at Jindřichov ve Slezsku station, where the railway from Opava and Olomouc via Krnov had already been completed in autumn 1872. At the threshold of 1876, two further sections were completed on 12 July: one from Goświnowice to Nysa, and the one continuing the route eastward from Nowy Świętów to Prudnik. By 15 August, the section from Prudnik through Racławice Śląskie to Głubczyce was ready, with Głubczyce becoming another junction station, without waiting for the railway to arrive from the north, they had already obtained a connection with Krnov in the south, located on the other side of the border, on 25 September 1873. On 1 December of the same year, an unplanned section from Racławice Śląskie through Głogówek to the junction station in Kędzierzyn was completed. This resulted in a change of the original plans, which had envisaged only extending the route to Głubczyce. The branch constructed to Kędzierzyn via Koźle eventually became significantly more important than the former main line to Głubczyce.

The Katowice–Legnica mainline on the left, leading to Nysa. On the right, there is an Otmuchów–Dziewiętlice branchline built in 1893, which leads to Bernartice.

After 23 years from the construction of the first section from Jaworzyna Śląska to Świdnica, an important line was built running along the Sudetes from Legnica to Kędzierzyn, measuring nearly 220 km (140 mi). From the so-called Sudeten Main Line, more lateral branch lines were constructed in later years. For example: from Jawor to Roztoka (1896) and Malczyce (1902), from Strzegom to Bolków (1890) and Malczyce (1895), from Świdnica to Wrocław via Sobótka (1898) and to Jedlina-Zdrój (1904), from Dzierżoniów to Bielawa (1891) and Srebrna Góra via Pieszyce (1903), from Piława Górna to Wrocław via Niemcza (1894), from Ząbkowice Śląskie to Srebrna Góra and to Ciepłowody (1908), from Kamieniec Ząbkowicki to Złoty Stok (1900), from Otmuchów to Dziewiętlice (1893), Bernartice (1896) and Przeworno (1910), from Nysa to Opole (1887), Ścinawa Nyska (1911) and Vidnava (1912), from Nowy Świętów to Sławniowice (1894), from Prudnik to Krapkowice (1896), and from Koźle to Polska Cerekiew (1898).

=== 20th century ===
==== Double track reconstruction ====
The double track main line at Pokrzywnica station in 2020

The reconstruction of the single-track main line from Jaworzyna Śląska to Świdnica and from Świdnica to Dzierżoniów began in 1906 and was completed with the opening of the second track between Mościsko and Dzierżoniów on 1 November 1910. The section from Dzierżoniów to Ząbkowice and Kamieniec Ząbkowicki was completed for a reconstruction into a double-track line in September 1911. At the same time, the work was ongoing on the modernisation of the station in Jaworzyna Śląska, which had to accommodate as many as four double-track lines.

===== Double track reconstruction in Świdnica =====
The reconstruction of the Bolesławice railway station was requested in a petition to the authorities submitted on 1 November 1904, referring to a request from the residents of Bolesławice, Stary Jaworów, Nowice, Wierzbna, Bagieniec, Wiśniowa, Sulisławice, Zawiszów, and Tomkowa in 1897. Between Bolesławice and the railway crossing with the Ciernie–Kąty Wrocławskie former coal roaad, several slender viaducts were rebuilt, carrying roads over the line to Stary Jaworów and Jaworzyna Śląska.

Over the Kanonierska street, between the 7th and 8th pillars, and the newly planned Esperantystów street, between the 15th and 16th pillars, two twin viaducts were constructed, whose side walls were faced with red bricks. For Wapienniczka, the stone and brick culvert was prepared, measuring 31 m (102 ft) in length with a clearance of 2.40 m × 2.40 m (7.9 ft × 7.9 ft). A narrow viaduct, paved with granite cubes, was built over the branch of the Kanionierska street on the Bolesławice viaduct, with the double-track line running underneath it. Due to the expansion of the sidings to the Zawiszów Thermal Power Plant, the western part of the embankment, which connected the road to the viaduct, was dismantled and the tracks were laid in its place.

The double-track reconstruction was carried out from the western side. It was indicated by differences in the materials used. For example, at the former northern boundary of the city, a three span viaduct was built in 1844, which was the largest structure of the line at that time. A viaduct was reconstructed precisely from the western side, with the Jabłoniec flowing under the northern span, the field road passing under the middle span, and the southern span remaining free. Most likely at that time, a 1.2 km (0.75 mi) long branch line leading to the sugar mill in Zawiszów was also dismantled. It branched off from the main line approximately 200 m (660 ft) north of the three span viaduct, next to the gatekeeper's house. The existing culvert of the Bolesławice viaduct was reconstructed; from the eastern side, it was made out of brick, while from the western side, it was extended with stone. The eastern side was built earlier, from roughly hewn and irregular stone blocks, while the western side consists of evenly laid layers of granite blocks.

An embankment and two short viaducts were built on the Witoszowski viaduct. A wide viaduct was constructed over Polna Droga Street, identical to Bolesławice viaduct, with two flat spans and characteristic abutments lined with red bricks. Over the Witoszowski Stream, a two-span, arched, stone and brick viaduct was built. However, being double-tracked, the viaduct is significantly wider and slightly higher.

Beyond the newly constructed viaducts, the double-track line cut through an enlarged excavation between Hangard Nowomłyński (currently a cemetery) and the elevations of the now occupied Słowiańskie neighborhood. It then proceeded over a viaduct above the road to Bystrzyca Dolna and the Pisarzowicki Stream, and across a three-span bridge over the Bystrzyca River, which was also rebuilt, the Witoszowski viaduct was widened in 1907 from 5.7 to 7.9 m (19 to 26 ft). A culvert located 270 m (890 ft) further along, for the former Młynówka tributary on the section, was also widened. During the reconstruction of the track for the future station in Kraszowice, the previously existing viaduct, under which a dirt road from Kraszowice to Opoczki ran, was removed. The crossing of the road with the tracks was moved slightly to the north, near the culvert with a partition, creating a level crossing with a guard, while in the same location only a very narrow stone-brick tunnel was built.

==== Flooding ====
In 1938, after a cloudburst in the Kłodzko Valley and the area around Jeseník, the water level arose in the rivers. The Otmuchów lake was unable to handle the vast amount of water flowing from the Eastern Neisse. On the night of 2 to 3 September, a flood wave from the Biała Głuchołaska basin also burst into the Nysa. The water destroyed the railway viaduct over the moat of the so-called "railway fortifications" (current Jagiellońska Street), which allowed train services to depart from Nysa towards Kędzierzyn and Opole. During the flood, five firefighters were working on the bridge. One of them perished, unable to leave the structure at the moment of its destruction. The loss of the viaduct disrupted connections with Upper Silesia, Opole, Głuchołazy, Vidnava, and Ścinawa for about half a year, until the construction of a new concrete bridge was completed.

=== Price of the construction ===
The Wrocław–Świdnica–Świebodzice Railway Company was, during its construction and the first years of operation, conventionally divided into two parts. The main line from Wrocław Świebodzki through Jaworzyna Śląska to Świebodzice, and the branch line from Jaworzyna Śląska to Świdnica. The former had a length of 15,278 rods, which is 57.445 kilometres (35.695 mi), while the latter was 2,380 rods, which is 8.949 kilometres (5.561 mi). One rod (German: Ruthe) measured 3.76 metres (12.3 ft). Overall expenditures on the construction of the main line amounted to nearly 1,724,000 thalers, and for the construction of the branch line, over 290,000 thalers. In total, 2,014,131 thalers were spent.

On the branch line from Jaworzyna Śląska to Świdnica, the largest amount was spent on constructing the track surface, which is the trackbed, sleepers, rails, other, totaling over 66,000 talers (426,000 — the corresponding expenditure amounts for the main line are given in parentheses). Only slightly less, 57,000 talers (202,000), was spent on preparing the areas for construction, which is line surveying. The next item was the construction of the railway station in Świdnica — 43,778 talers. The total cost of building the other five stations on the main line amounted to nearly 364,000 talers. Additionally, although relatively small, there were costs for building stops in Smolec (392 talers) and Mietków (491 talers).

The purchase of land for the construction of the branch line consumed over 33,000 talers (214,000 for the main line), the construction of railway crossings over 12,000 talers (50,300), and bridges and culverts nearly 11,400 (60,900 talers). The remaining common costs were divided proportionally between both lines. For example, the purchase of cars — 20,500 talers (133,000), locomotives nearly 17,000 talers (107,500), the construction of a coking plant for the railway's needs in the village of Ciernie 4,000 talers (32,300), or the purchase of uniforms for staff 685 talers (4,200).

Certain additional costs on the branch line arose due to the Świdnica fortress. For example, more than 55 thalers were paid for the transfer of gunpowder, stored in the fortress magazine located near the newly constructed station. Furthermore, it was necessary to maintain a financial reserve of as much as 30,000 thalers to cover the potential costs of constructing a bridge 75 metres (246 ft) long, which, according to the authorities’ demand, was to be built in the area of the Świdnica fortress as a necessary defensive element. Presumably, this was intended in which the final section of the track before the station could be blown up, thereby preventing the enemy from advancing with a train directly to the fortress's borders. Moreover, similar demands were made by the military authorities 10 years later, when permission was finally granted to extend this line to Dzierżoniów, and that through the fortress itself.
