= Ząbkowice Śląskie railway station =

Railway station in Poland

Ząbkowice Śląskie
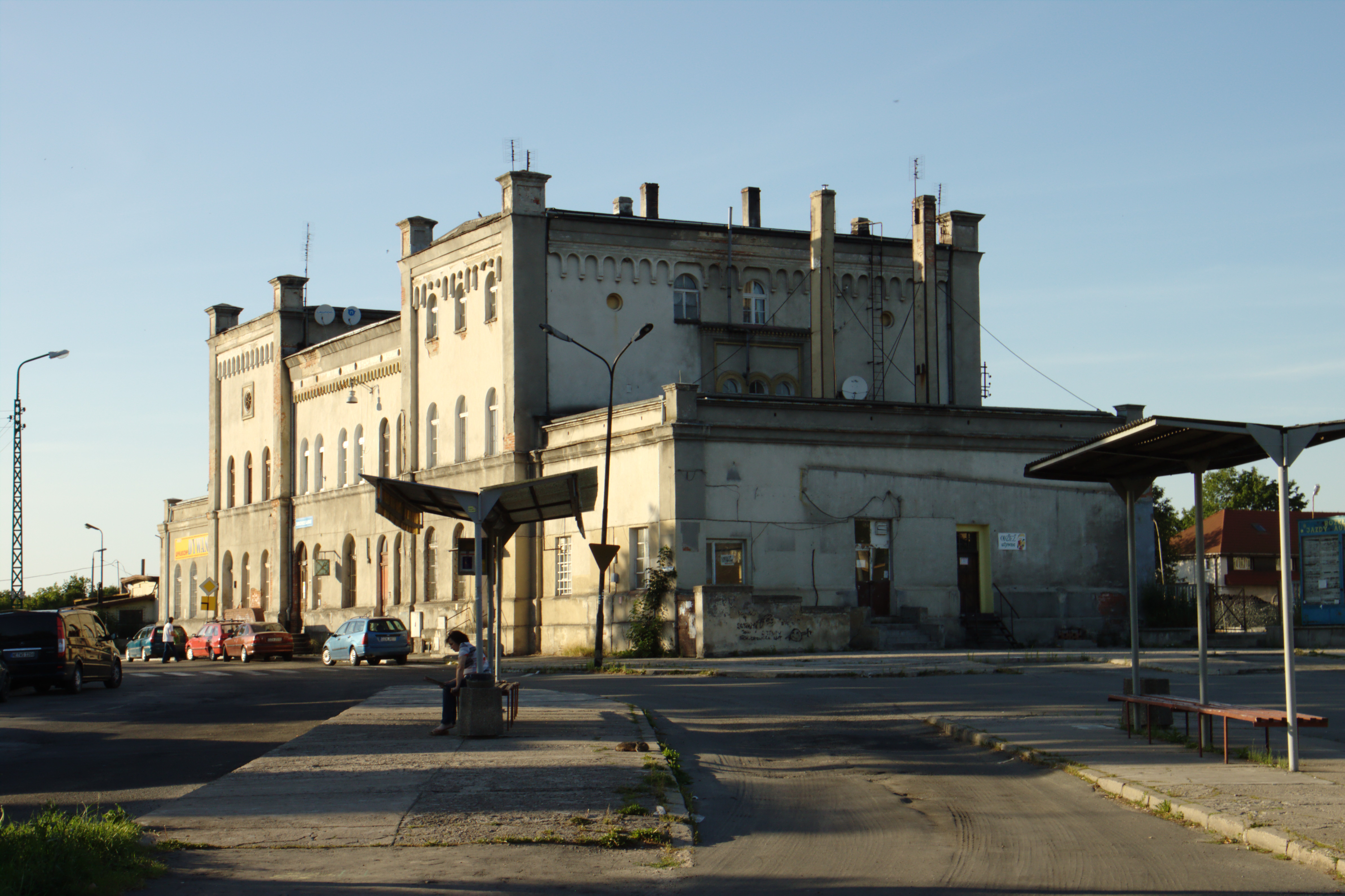
- Ząbkowice Śląskie station building in 2013

General information
- Location: Ząbkowice Śląskie, Lower Silesian Voivodeship; Poland
- Coordinates: 50°35′50.640″N 16°48′44.208″E
- Owner: Polskie Linie Kolejowe
- Line: Katowice–Legnica
- Platforms: 2
- Tracks: 2
- Train operators: PKP Intercity; Lower Silesian Railways

History
- Opened: 1858
- Former names: Frankenstein (before 1914); Frankenstein (Schlesien) (1914–1945); Ząbkowice nad Sadliną (1945–1946)
Location
- Location within Poland Location within Lower Silesian Voivodeship

Ząbkowice Śląskie is a railway station in Ząbkowice Śląskie, in the Lower Silesian Voivodeship in Poland, located at kilometer 187 of the Sudeten Main Line. According to the PKP classification, it has the category of a local station.

== Passenger traffic ==
Year	Passenger exchange per day
2017	100-149
2022	200-299

== History ==
The station was opened on 1 November 1858. For 16 years, it served as a terminal station. It was planned to route the Wrocław–Międzylesie railway line through here, but ultimately the variant through Kamieniec Ząbkowicki was chosen. On 1 April 1874, the line was extended to Kamieniec Ząbkowicki and later that same year further extended to Goświnowice, and in the following years towards Upper Silesia.

Between 1910 and 1911, the Dzierżoniów–Kamieniec Ząbkowicki section was rebuilt as a double-track line. One track was dismantled in 1945. After the war, Ząbkowice had connections to Kraków, Katowice, Legnica, Kondratowice, Nysa, Jelenia Góra, Zielona Góra, and Jaworzyna Śląska. Currently, 18 passenger trains operate on the route Kłodzko Miasto – Kraków Główny – Kamieniec Ząbkowicki – Jaworzyna Śląska – Legnica – Jelenia Góra. The route is also used by freight trains.

On 27 and 28 September 2008, celebrations of the 150th anniversary of the opening of the railway in Ząbkowice Śląskie took place.

In October 2026, part of renovation works of the Katowice–Legnica railway, the platforms at Ząbkowice Śląskie will be rebuilt to be high-level.
