= Nowy Świętów–Głuchołazy railway =

Railway line in Poland

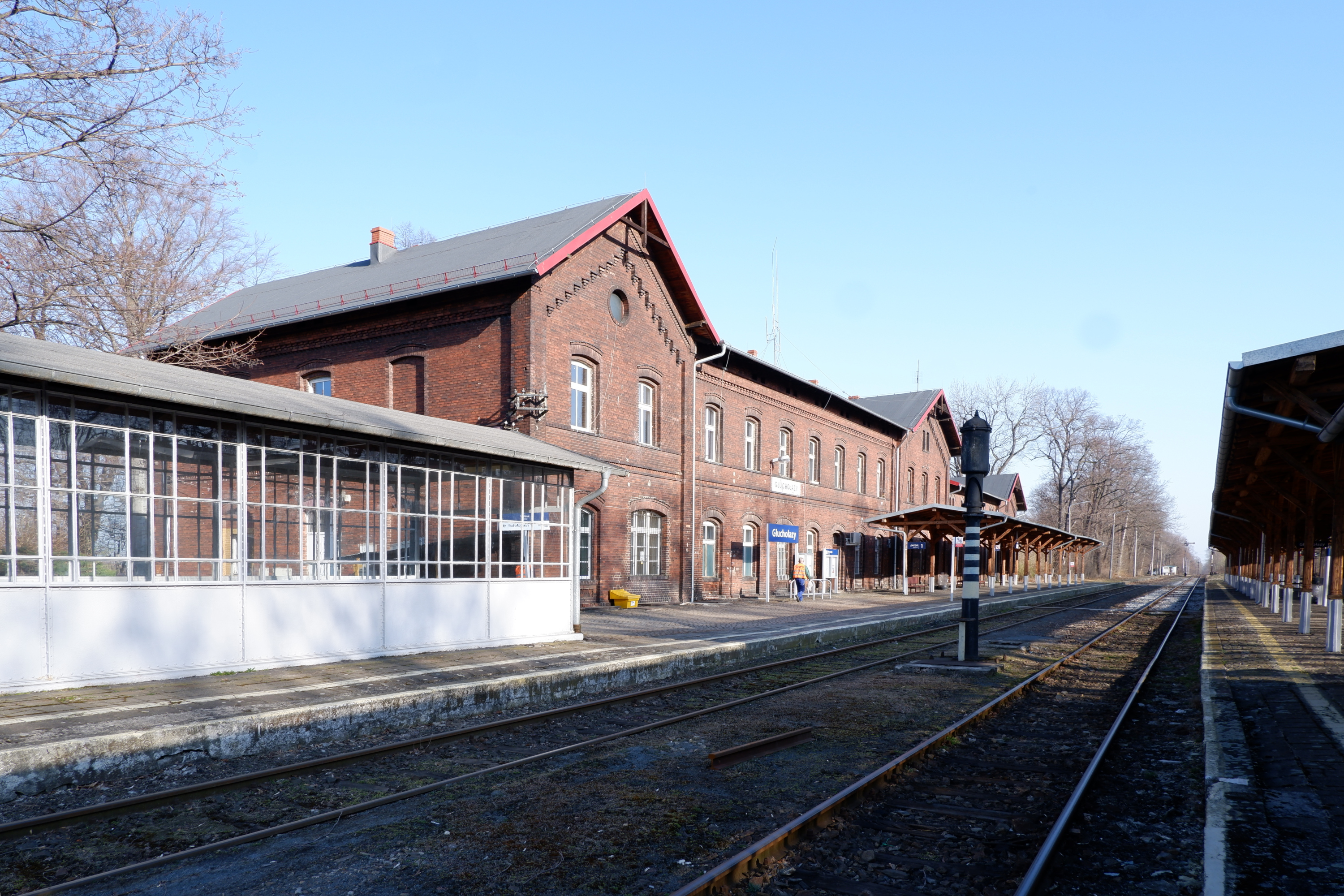
- Głuchołazy railway station in 2022

Overview
- Status: Operational
- Owner: PKP PLK
- Line number: 297
- Locale: Poland
- Termini: Nowy Świętów; Głuchołazy Zdrój
- Connecting lines: Sudeten Main Line; Krnov–Głuchołazy railway Hanušovice–Głuchołazy railway
- Stations: 4

Service
- Type: Heavy rail
- Operator: Polregio
- Rolling stock: PKP class SA134

History
- Opened: 5 November 1875
- Last extension: 1 May 1914

Technical
- Line length: 8.5 km (5.3 mi)
- Number of tracks: Single track
- Track gauge: 1,435 mm (4 ft 8 1/2 in) standard gauge
- Operating speed: 60 km/h (37 mph)

The Nowy Świętów–Głuchołazy railway is an operational 8.5-kilometre (5.3 mi) long mainline and partly a branchline in Poland, connecting the village of Nowy Świętów and the town of Głuchołazy. The railway line opened in 1875, then it was extended to Głuchołazy Zdrój station in 1914. The passenger traffic ceased in 2004, then it was reactivated on Nowy Świętów–Głuchołazy part in 2007, and was reactivated on Głuchołązy–Głuchołazy Miasto part in 2014.

The railway used to be numbered 129 according to D29 from 1949, the number changed to 252 in 1971, and changed to the current number 297 in 1985 where its current number is still being used today.

== Route ==
The line starts at Nowy Świętów railway station on the Sudeten Main Line where it goes south to Głuchołazy. The line passes the Rudawa junction and stops at Głuchołazy railway station. The line enters the town and goes along the Głuchołazy–Mikulovice railway (Hanušovice–Głuchołazy railway) where it crosses the National road 40 and passes Głuchołazy Miasto station. The line crosses Kopernika street and Powstańców Śląskich street, where it stops at Głuchołazy Zdrój station.

== History ==
The railway between Deutsch Wette (Nowy Świętów) and Ziegenhals (Głuchołazy) was opened on 5 November 1875 by Oberschlesische Eisenbahn (OSE). On December 1 1875, the Imperial Royal Privileged Moravian-Silesian Central Railway opened the Jägerndorf–Ziegenhals (Krnov–Głuchołązy) railway in Austrian Silesia. Following the nationalization of the OSE, the railway became part of the Prussian State Railway on 1 July 1886. Österreichische Lokaleisenbahngesselschaft (ÖLEG) opened the Hannsdorf–Ziegenhals (Hanusovice–Głuchołązy) railway in 1888. The branch line to Ziegenhals Bad (Głuchołazy Zdrój) was opened on 1 May 1914 to improve the access to the town.

After 1939, the Reichsbahn Directorate of Oppeln ceased passenger traffic between Ziegenhals Hbf and Ziegenhals Bad. As a replacement, a new stop Ziegenhals Stadt was set up on the parallel route to Hannsdorf, which had come into operation in October 1938 as a result of the annexation of the Sudetenland. The Rudawa junction was built in the 1940s.

The Rudawa junction connecting the Sudeten main line towards Prudnik was closed between the 1960s and 1970s. The freight traffic on the Głuchołazy–Głuchołazy Zdrój part was ceased in August 2000 due to the closure of the furniture factory. The passenger traffic was ceased on 1 August 2004, and was reactivated again on 26 January 2007.

On 19 March 2013, Sejm asked the minister of transport, construction and maritime economy to close the railway, which only resulted in dismantling the railway crossing between Głuchołazy Miasto and Głuchołazy Zdrój on 1 December 2014. The Głuchołazy Miasto station was reopened on 14 December 2014, improving the passenger traffic on the railway.
