= Kamieniec Ząbkowicki–Złoty Stok railway =

Railway line in Poland

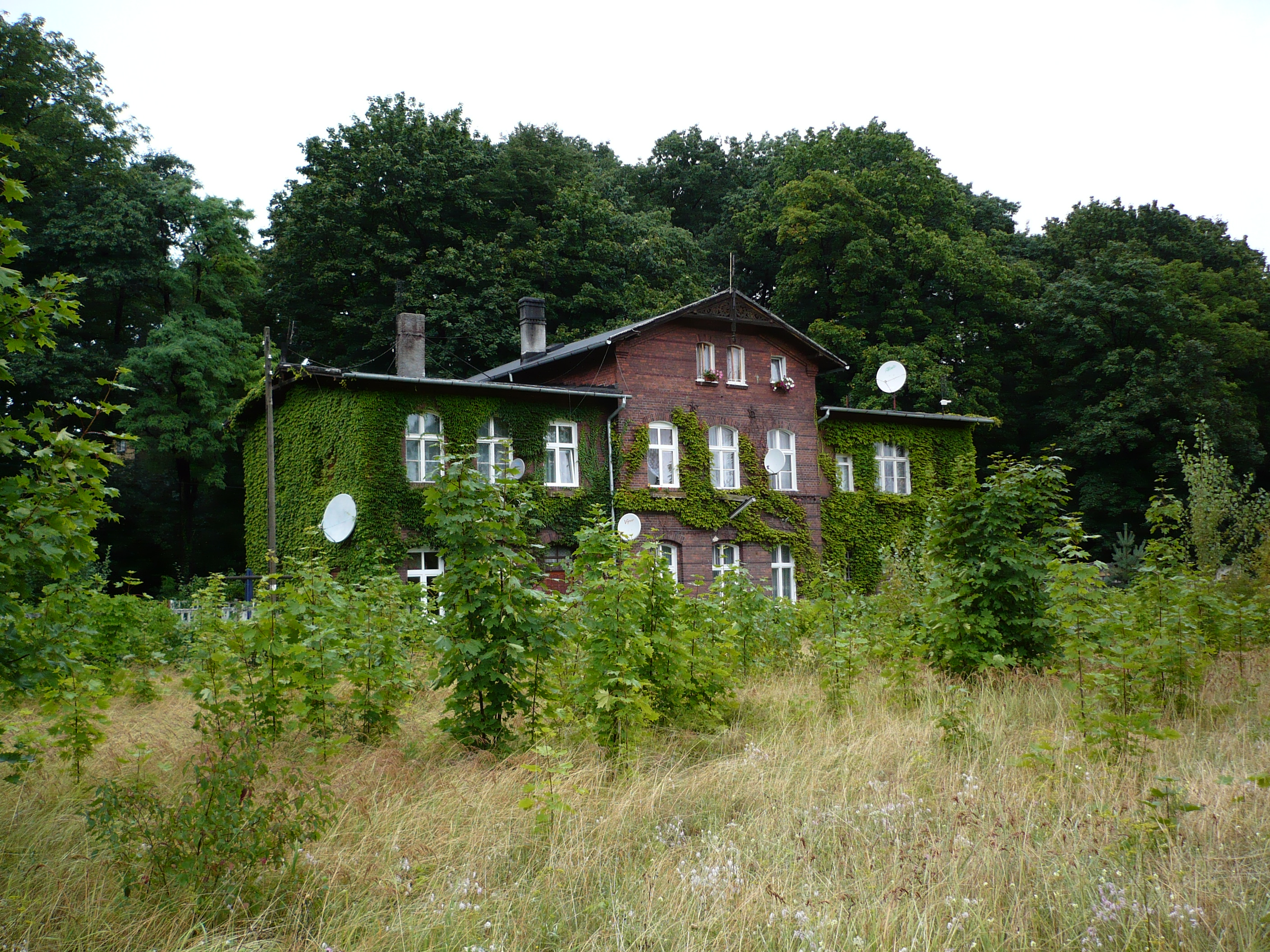
- Złoty Stok railway station in 2008

Overview
- Status: Defunct
- Owner: Reichensteiner Bahn AG; PKP PLK
- Line number: 334
- Locale: Poland
- Termini: Kamieniec Ząbkowicki; Złoty stok
- Connecting lines: Sudeten Main Line; Wrocław–Międzylesie railway
- Stations: 5

Service
- Type: Heavy rail
- Rolling stock: PKP class Ty2; PKP class TKt48
- Ridership: 69,198 (1912)

History
- Opened: 3 November 1900
- Closed: July 1997

Technical
- Line length: 11.7 km (7.3 mi)
- Number of tracks: Single track
- Track gauge: 1,435 mm (4 ft 8 1/2 in) standard gauge

The Kamieniec Ząbkowicki–Złoty Stok railway (formerly known as Reichensteiner Bahn) is a defunct 11.7 km (7.3 mi) long branch line in Poland, connecting the junction station in Kamieniec Ząbkowicki and the town of Złoty Stok. The railway opened in 1900 and was closed in 1997 due to the flood.

The railway used to be numbered 209 according to D29 from 1949, the number was changed to 265 in 1971, and changed to the current number 334 in 1985 where the current number is still used after the closure.

== Route ==
The line starts at Kamieniec Ząbkowicki railway station on both of the railways called Sudeten Main Line and Wrocław–Międzylesie railway, the line crosses the Ogrodowa street next to the station and heads south to Byczeń, the line is branched with the brickworks via an industrial track, heading south west it crosses the Voivodeship road 382 and passes Byczeń station (3.2 km of the line).

Next it crosses the Eastern Neisse river and passes the village of Śrem alongside, the line crosses the road to Śrem and passes Sosnowa Śląska station (6.2 km of the line), then it follows the Voivodeship road 390 crossing the road to Błotnica and passing Płonica Śląska station (9.1 km of the line). The line enters the town of Złoty Stok and stops at Złoty stok railway station located towards Traugutta street (part of the National road 46).

== History ==
=== Beginning ===
==== Early proposals ====
The first proposals for a new railway was made in June 1883. The local mine and factory owner Hermann Güttler proposed connecting the railway to Reichenstein (Złoty Stok). According to original assumptions, the planned railway was to connect Camenz (Kamieniec Ząbkowicki), Reichenstein, and Landeck (Lądek Zdrój). A committee was formed to assess the profitability of the project. The idea of connecting Reichenstein with Landeck by traversing the Golden Mountains seemed impossible, which the idea was scrapped. The idea of constructing a railway took place in 1892, when the same industrialist Hermann Güttler proposed the construction of a secondary railway from Camenz to Reichenstein, or a railway along the Patschkau (Paczków)–Reichenstein–Wartha (Bardo)–Silberberg (Srebrna Góra)–Frankenstein (Ząbkowice Śląskie) road. The Princess Alexandrina, wife of Wilhelm von Mecklenburg-Schwerin and owner of the Weißwasser (Bílá Voda) estate, chose the proposal of constructing a railway between Camenz and Reichenstein in which she agreed, and Prince Albrecht Hohenzollern was also expected to support the proposal.

==== Plans ====
The law on local railways and private branch lines from 28 July 1892 (Gesetz über Kleinbahnen und Privatanschlussbahnen vom 28. Juli 1892) changed the scope of the committee's activities in favor of connecting Camenz and Reichenstein by rail. Local activists forming the committee chaired by Herman Güttler took action on their own. In 1895 the local activists contacted the experienced royal surveyor Kraus from Glatz (Kłodzko), which in October conducted measurements determining the route of the planned railway. Kraus envisioned the location of the future station in Reichenstein behind the shooting range (Schützenhause) on the Camenz road. A few days later, the committee sent the preliminary draft of the route to the president of the Breslau (Wrocław) regency Dr. Wilhelm von Heydebrand und der Las.

In addition to the measurements, the submitted application included a justification prepared by the mayor of Reichenstein Tschäcke, who wrote the main reason for constructing the railway was to improve transportation to the neighboring lime deposits, which were used since 1870 at a rate of 100 thousand hundredweights (5080 tons) annually. 40 workers were in the lime deposits, in previous years the number reached to 120 workers. The Reichenstein lime deposits could not compete with the production plants in Gogolin and Groß Strehlitz (Strzelce Opolskie) without the right transportation. Other important plants indicated by the mayor that would benefit from the railway included the brickworks, the forestry industry, the quarries, and the gravel pit.

Consultations at the ministerial level showed the state was interested in Reichenstein's industrial potential, which is the reason the minister initially refused to grant consent for the planned railway as a private tertiary railway. The minister claimed that if the construction of the railway to Maifritzdorf (Mąkolno) and Jauernig (Javornik) were to continue, the railway should be state-owned, implemented according to the railway Act of 1838. Most likely for financial reasons, the consent was granted.

==== Permitting and acceptance for the construction ====
In April 1896, the minister permitted the construction of the railway from Camenz to Reichenstein and the Güttler's factory with a branch to Maifritzdorf, with the stipulation of which the railway would not extend beyond. The justification for the limited route of the railway stemmed from the desire to avoid complicated international negotiations, which were not necessarily commensurate with the generated operating revenues. The ministerial decision meant the work began on preparing railway plans. The preparation was entrusted to the surveyor Krause from Glatz. The documentation preparation for the location of a small railway station next to Camenz railway station required several weeks of work. According to administrative and legal procedures, the station plans were ready to be accepted in October 1896. Routine officials participated in the acceptance of the railway plans. On behalf of Breslau railway management were Registrar's Counselor Wilde, Privy Counselor Schmökel, and Registrar's Assessor Fauk. The Starost of Frankenstein Held (as a representative of Albrecht Hohenzollern), the Director of Camenz Castle Eschs, the Mayor of Reichenstein Tschäcke, Registrar's Counselor Buchholz and Buddenberg, referred to as the commercial counselor H. Güttler and surveyor Krause. The next steps required field verification of the plans. Between 1896 and 1897, together with the railway management in Breslau, final arrangements were made regarding the location of the small station in Camenz, and in the following year also for other facilities along the railway.

==== Construction of the railway ====
On February 9, 1898, the president of Breslau regency granted commercial counselor Hermann Güttler a concession to build and operate a standard-gauge railway from Camenz railway station to Reichenstein with a branch line to Maifritzdorf. According to the provisions of the Private Railways Act of 1892, the concession provided passenger and freight transport using steam traction. The construction and enabling traffic was to be completed within three years, under penalty of a fine of 50,000 goldmarks. In order to secure the amount, the owner was required to deposit an aforementioned deposit amount at the cashier's office of the Breslau regency.

The concession specified the rules for the railway's administration requiring the maintenance of renewal and reserve funds. It defined the most important rules for traffic restrictions which for example, the maximum speed could not exceed 30 km/h. According to the regulations the railway was supervised by the president of Breslau regency and also by the railway management in Breslau from a technical perspective. The cost of constructing the railway estimated by the European Commission in Breslau at 2,200,000 goldmarks, assumed financial participation from the city of Reichenstein, which at its meeting on 27 March 1897 committed to subsidizing the railway owner by up to 550,000 goldmarks. The Silesian Province committed to covering one-quarter of the construction costs. Due to the lack of state capital participating in the construction of the railway, it prevented the construction of a branch line to Maifritzdorf, which was never built again. This was caused from an unexpected increase in steel and land prices that lead to a significant cost overruns and a significant overrun of the initial capital.

In 1898, the construction of a 12-kilometer railway has begun. Field supervision was provided by Counselor Krause, while District Counselor Urban supervised the work on behalf of the Breslau Railway Management. Among the major structures, three passenger stations were built, a bridge over Eastern Neisse river in Baitzen (Byczeń) was built, and three road underpasses in Baitzen, Schrom (Śrem), and Reichenstein were made. The railway equipment and facilities with the participation of Counselors Schmökel and Urban was scheduled to be accepted on January 19, 1899.

=== 1900 - 1945 ===
The railway was opened on 3 November 1900 enabling passenger and freight traffic. In 1906, the owner of the railway Hermann Güttler passed away, and the ownership and representation of the railway passed to his wife Gertrud Güttler. Since 1 September 1906, the Camenz – Reichenstein railway was run by the employed services inspector (Betriebsinspektor) Benno Tinzmann. The failure to comply with the concession provisions regarding the branch line to Maifritzdorf resulted in the state intending to take ownership of the railway in 1908. Gertrud Güttler's personal intervention with the President of the Silesian Province resulted in the decision being postponed until 1911. The desire to rebuild the branch line to Maifritzdorf was interrupted by the outbreak of World War I.

Between 1912 and 1913, a 220m branch line to the newly built fuse factory was built near Reichenstein. The branch line is located 11.48 km of the railway, and the cost of the construction was 6,365 goldmarks. The work began on transferring passenger and freight traffic to the Prussian state railways in Camenz. Due to the outbreak of war, the work was not completed until 1917. On December 10, 1918, Gertrud Güttler transferred the railway ownership to her sons Dr. Wilhelm and Gerhart Güttler. In 1917, a huge increase in both passenger and freight transport has occurred, which related with the transport of raw materials from Reichenstein for military needs and the commuting of people employed in the local industry. The amount of goods transported in 1917 was estimated 99,101 tons, and the ridership in 1918 reached 176,822 passengers.

In 1920, the freight transport dropped by almost half compared to 1917, and passenger ridership also dropped by one third. During World War I, Reichenstein had a population of approximately 2,500 residents. Nearly half of the town's population worked in the Güttler arsenic factory. The rest were employed in the limestone quarries, dynamite factory, fuse factory, sawmill, and carpentry shop. Before the outbreak of the war, the arsenic factory employed approximately 350 people, while during the war the number increased to 1,300. Employment remained at 900 workers until May 1924. Due to a lack of sales for the raw material produced and the difficult economic situation, a strike broke out in the production plants in May 1925 lasting until January of the following year, and one of the Gerhart brothers withdrew from the business. The number of employees dropped to 70 people.

Due to the decline in tax revenues, the situation brought the town the brink of bankruptcy. The post-war crisis meant that no bank was willing to grant the company a loan for further operations, which in 1925 Wilhelm Güttler proposed to Deutsche Reichsbahn the resale of the Camenz–Reichenstein railway (which was in good technical condition). A transaction would have enabled the company and also the town to overcome the crisis. Despite negotiations at the ministerial and provincial levels which embroiled in financial difficulties, Deutsche Reichsbahn did not undertake the purchase of the railway.

To counteract the difficulties of the post-war crisis, the railway owned by Wilheim Güttler began combined rail and bus services in 1928: by train on the Camenz – Reichenstein section, and by bus on the Patschkau – Reichenstein – Landeck section. Bus services were operated until September 1939 when traffic between Patschkau, Reichenstein and Landeck was suspended due to the Wehrmacht transferring vehicles for war purposes. In August 1939, the Breslau regency presidium gave permission for the railway to have self-propelled diesel railcars (Triebwagen) operating on the railway. Due to the outbreak of World War II, the railway ceased its service.

=== PKP use ===
After WWII, PKP took over the railway, the railway did not saw serious investments. The freight transport was decreased in the 1960s due to the closure of production plants and the mines. The passenger traffic was ceased on May 26, 1990, due to the increase of road transport. During the 1997 flood, the rising waters of the Eastern Neisse River ripped away the railway bridge in Byczeń, causing significant damage to the track structure, aside from the destroyed bridge, most of the smaller bridges above the roads on the railway remained intact, the railway was closed in 1998. In 2010, a draisine railway was established, it did not last long before May 2013 when the railway became overgrown. It was decided to dismantle the railway in 2017. In April 2023, ProKolej fundation proposed reconstructing closed railway lines in Lower Silesian Voivodeship, which included Kamieniec Ząbkowicki–Złoty Stok railway, as proposed the railway would increase the ridership of tourists and help solve the shortage of parking spaces of the former gold mine in Złoty Stok.

== Service ==
=== Passenger ===
Ridership
| Year | Number of passengers |
|---|---|
| 1902 | 39,981 |
| 1912 | 69,198 |
| 1918 | 176,822 |

Since the railway opened, the railway saw 3 passenger trains operating each day only in Winter, as the transport on the railway was limited. The railway saw 6 passenger trains, of which 3 operated only on Whitsundays since May 1902. A huge number of ridership reached 176,822 passengers in 1918, despite this the railway saw 3-4 passenger trains each day, after WWI the ridership dropped by one third. The owner of the railway established a bus service that saw 4-5 buses each day, the railway saw 5 passenger trains each day in 1943. The railway was reactivated in 1946 and saw 2 passenger trains each day, by the late 1940s it saw 4 passenger trains, and by the late 1980s saw 2-4 passenger trains each day. The journey between Kamieniec Ząbkowicki and Złoty Stok took 24 to 35 minutes.

=== Freight ===
Freight transport
| Year | Number of freight in tons |
|---|---|
| 1902 | 27,595 |
| 1912 | 53,360 |
| 1918 | 99,101 |

The main reason for the railway to be built was to transport goods and raw materials from nearby areas of Reichenstein (Złoty Stok) and connecting settlements, mostly including lime. 27,595 tons of freight was transported on the railway in 1902, and 53,360 tons of freight was transported in 1912. The number of freight transported heavily increased during World War I to 99,101 tons, the significant needs for the military made the railway busy relying on raw materials. After passenger traffic was ceased, the railway was used as a shunting branch line.

The railway relied goods from the brickworks in Baitzen (Byczeń), the fuse factory and the arsenic factory in Reichenstein, the coal was somehow transported to the branched industrial plants including the power plant in Reichenstein, as it was the fuel for industrial plants, the ash was also transported from Reichenstein as it was the industrial waste. Lime was the most important freight on the railway, lime came from lime deposits in Reichenstein. The bricks transportation was ceased in the 1960s as well as arsenic factory in 1960.

== Rolling stock ==
The railway had a fleet of 2 Prussian T 3 locomotives, 4 passenger coaches, 2 mail coaches, 11 open wagons without brakes and 5 with brakes, 2 covered goods wagon, 2 flat wagons, 3 lidded wagons and one maintenance wagon. The railway received a diesel railcar built by WUMAG in 1939. During PKP use, the railway relied fleet from the state railway including Ty2 and TKt48 locomotives, Donnerbüsche and Pafawag 120A passenger coaches.
