= Prudnik railway station =

Railway station in Prudnik, Poland

Prudnik
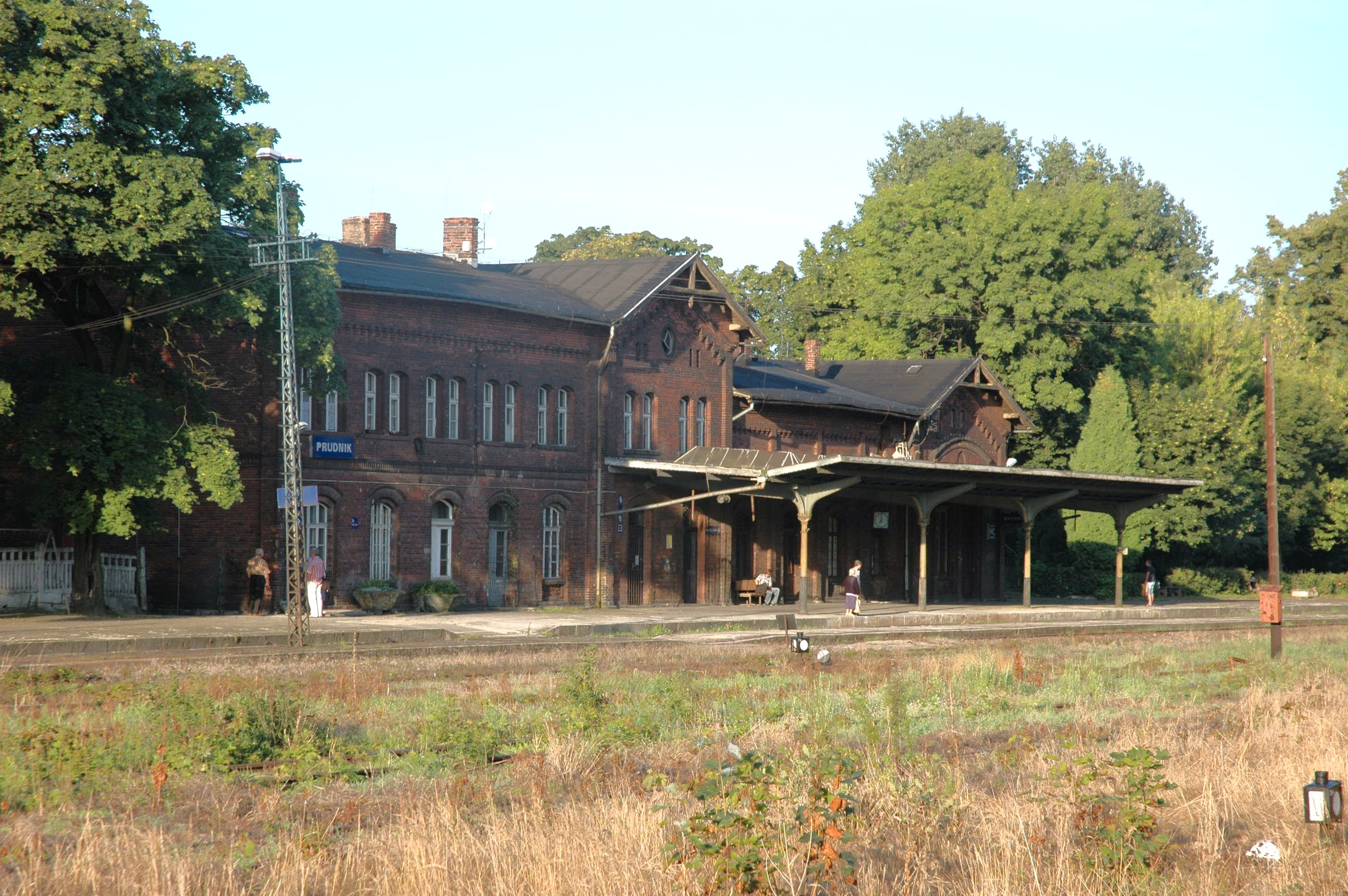

General information
- Location: Prudnik, Opole Voivodeship; Poland
- Coordinates: 50.329444°N 17.576944°E
- Owner: Polskie Koleje Państwowe S.A.
- Platforms: 3

History
- Opened: 1876
- Former names: Neustadt (1876–1900); Neustadt (Oberschles.) (1901–1945); Prądnik (1945–1946)
Location
- Location within Poland

Prudnik railway station is a station in Prudnik, Opole Voivodeship, Poland.

The station was opened in 1876 as a part of Upper Silesian Railway.

== Connections ==
- 137 Katowice - Legnica
- 306 Gogolin - Prudnik
