= Nysa–Brzeg railway =

Railway line in Poland

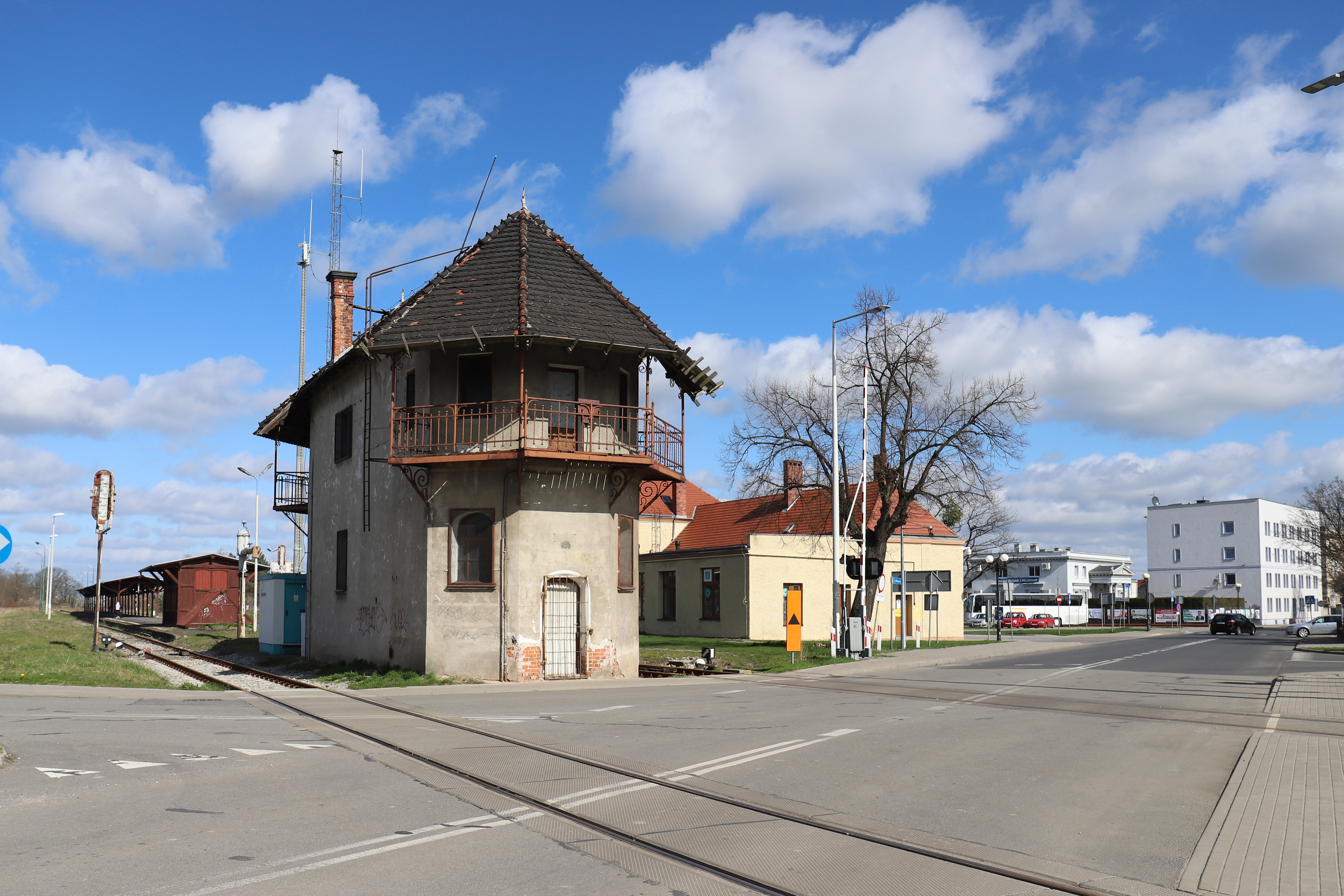
- Warszawska street railway crossing in Grodków

Overview
- Other name: Brzegowianka
- Status: Operational
- Owner: PKP PLK
- Line number: PKP 288
- Locale: Poland
- Termini: Nysa; Brzeg
- Connecting lines: Sudeten Main Line; Opole–Nysa railway Bytom–Wrocław railway
- Former connections: Grodków–Głęboka railway Szydłów–Lipowa Śląska railway Brzeg–Łagiewniki railway
- Stations: 11

Service
- Operator: Polregio
- Rolling stock: PKP class SA134; PKP class SA137; PKP class SA103

History
- Opened: 25 July 1847
- Last extension: 26 November 1848

Technical
- Line length: 47.4 km (29.5 mi)
- Number of tracks: Single track
- Track gauge: 1,435 mm (4 ft 8 1/2 in) standard gauge
- Operating speed: 70 km/h (43 mph)

The Nysa–Brzeg railway, nicknamed Brzegowianka is a single-track, non-electrified branch line connecting Nysa railway station in Nysa and Brzeg railway station in Brzeg in the Opole Voivodeship of southern Poland. Lengthened at 47.4 km (29.5 mi), it is one of the oldest railway lines in Poland.

The railway used to be numbered 144 according to D29 from 1949, the number changed to 255 in 1971, and changed to the current number 288 in 1985 where its current number is still being used today.

== Route ==
The line starts at Nysa railway station on the Sudeten Main Line, where it follows the mainline heading north and crosses Eastern Neisse river, next the line separates from the mainline once it reaches National road 46 and curves to Bykowice passing Myśliczyn railway station (6.4 km of the line). The line heads north north east passing Pakosławice railway station (9.4 km of the line), next it shifts north once it reaches Skoroszyce passing Skoroszyce railway station (15 km of the line) and heads to Chróścina passing Chróścina Nyska railway station (17.6 km of the line), the line was branched with a scrapyard.

The line still heads north passing Stary Grodków railway station (21.3 km of the line) and the Voivodeship road 401 below, next it enters Grodków and passes Grodków railway station (26.6 km of the line), the line was connected with Grodków–Głęboka railway. After Grodków the line shifts north east passing Lipowa Śląska railway station (32.5 km of the line), it was connected with Szydłów–Lipowa Śląska railway, the line passes European route E40 below and Czeska Wieś railway station (35.9 km of the line) where it crosses Voivodeship road 458 and heads north north west. Next it passes Olszanka railway station (40.1 km of the line) and crosses Voivodeship road 462, near Brzeg the line follows the Bytom–Wrocław railway passing National road 94 below and stops at Brzeg railway station, ending the line.
