= Nysa railway station =

Railway station in Poland

Nysa
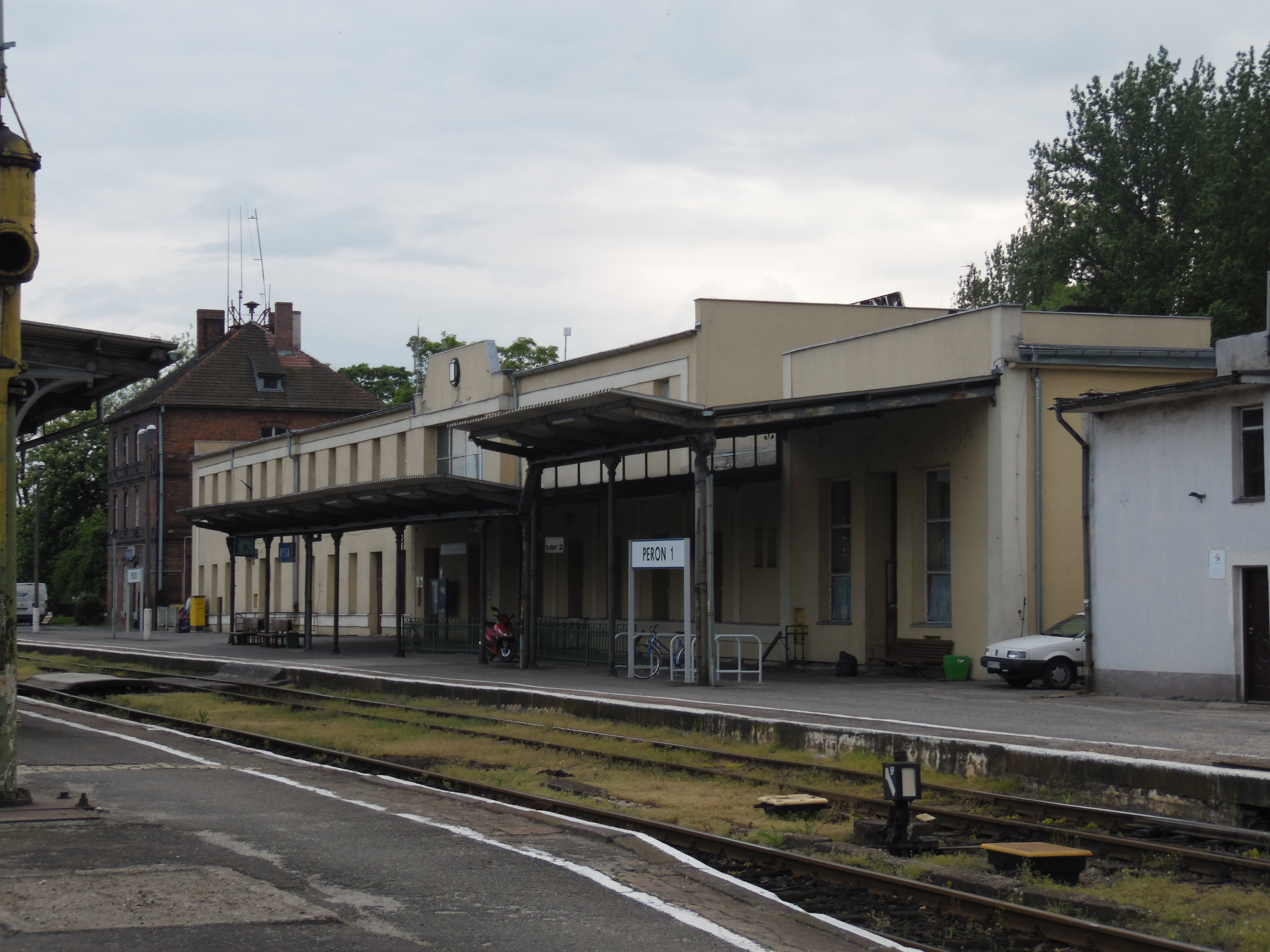
- Nysa railway station in 2015

General information
- Location: Nysa, Opole Voivodeship; Poland
- Owner: Polskie Linie Kolejowe
- Lines: Katowice–Legnica; Opole–Nysa; Nysa–Brzeg; Nysa–Kałków Łąka (closed in 1991); Nysa–Ścinawa Mała (closed in 1971)
- Platforms: 3
- Tracks: 4
- Train operators: PKP Intercity; Polregio

History
- Opened: 1848; 1878 (current location)
- Former names: Neisse (before 1945); Nisa (1945–1946)

Key dates
- 2023: Station building renovated
Location
- Location within Poland Location within Opole Voivodeship

Nysa is a railway station in the town of Nysa, in the Opole Voivodeship in southern Poland, it is originally a six-directional, and currently a four-directional junction railway. It is crossed by five railway lines, including three with permitted passenger traffic. Nearby, there are unused and deteriorating engine sheds.

The station is located on Racławicka Street, adjacent to the PKS bus station.

== Passenger traffic ==
Year	Passenger exchange per day
2018	1000–1500
2022	1200

== History ==
The two-story station building located on Racławicka Street, near the city center, was built in 1878. Until 1945, the station served as the main station on the Sudeten Main Line. It was one of the more important stations of the so-called Sudeten Main Line. During its heyday, the station had a very well-developed railway infrastructure – nearby there were, among other things, engine sheds and a water tower, as well as an underground passage between the platforms. In 1945, the bombed station roof burned down, and part of the walls collapsed. In 1957, a new building was erected in its place.

Next to the main station before 1945, railway stations operated in Nysa on local routes to Kałków and Ścinawa Mała, serviced by the company Lenz & Co. Parallel to the current station, on the other side of Racławicka Street, there was the Nysa Miasto railway station. About 1 km further along the tracks of the Sudeten Main Line, there was Nysa Dworzec Mały (Mała Nysa) railway station, after which the tracks diverged. In the direction of Ścinawa, they crossed over the Mainline tracks via a viaduct, and the next station on this line was Nysa Nowy Świat railway station. Tracks in the direction of Kałków continued further along the mainline, with the next station being Nysa Górna Wieś (Nysa suburb).
