= Katowice Załęże railway station =

Railway station in Katowice, Poland

Katowice Załęże
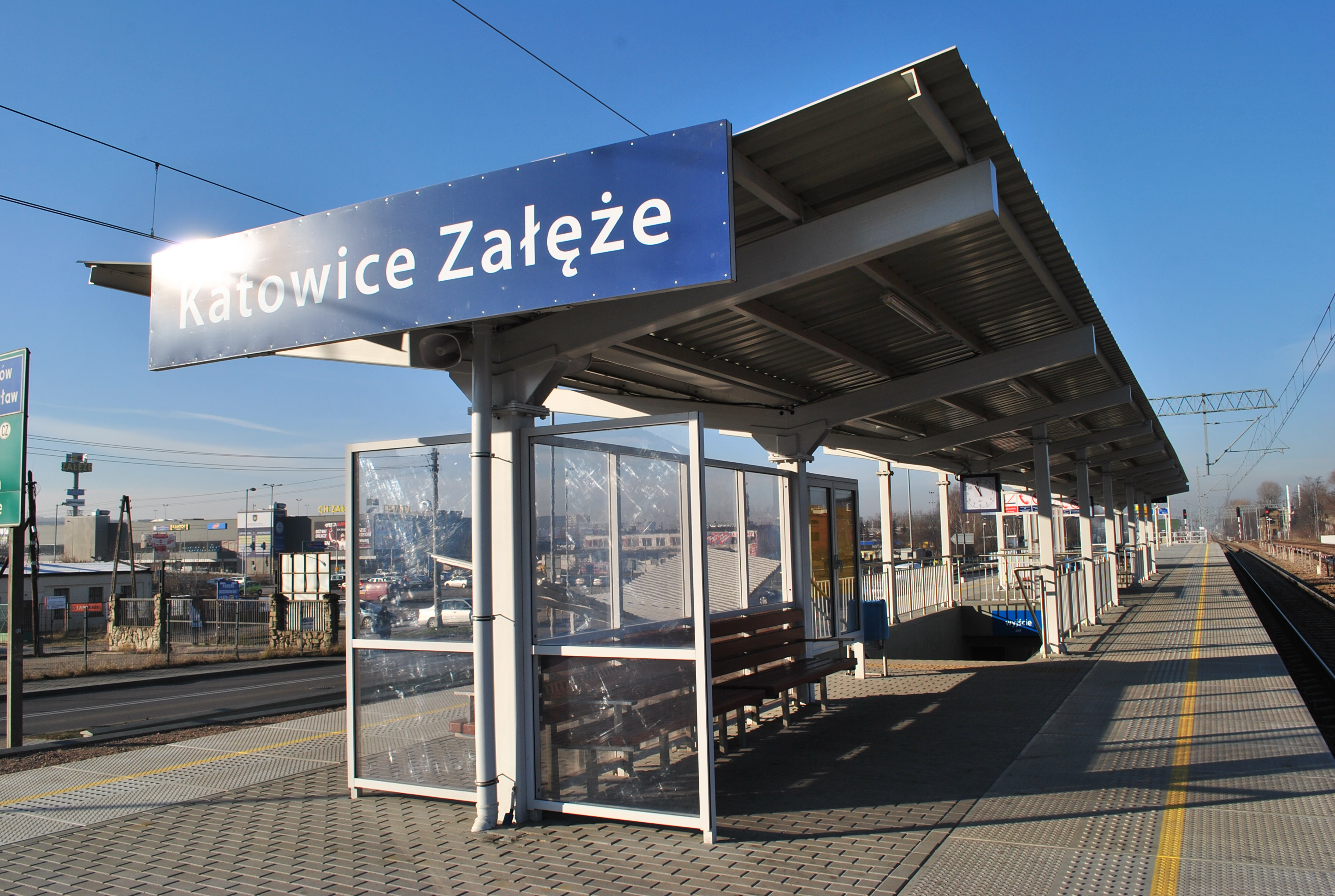
- Middle part of the platform at the station (view towards Gliwice)

General information
- Location: Załęże, Katowice; Poland
- Coordinates: 50°15′49.08″N 18°59′25.5340″E
- System: train station
- Manager: PKP Polskie Linie Kolejowe
- Line: Katowice–Legnica railway
- Platforms: 1

History
- Opened: 1957
Location
- Location within Silesian Voivodeship

Katowice Załęże is a railway station in Katowice, located in the Załęże district in southern Poland. The stop, situated on the international E 30 railway line, was built in 1957, with scheduled train services beginning in 1966. Regional trains operated by Silesian Railways, traveling towards Częstochowa, Katowice, Lubliniec, and Gliwice, stop at this station.

== Passenger traffic ==
| Year | Daily passenger exchange |
|---|---|
| 2017 | 150–199 |
| 2022 | 300–399 |

The station is located in the northwestern part of Katowice, near the intersection of Bocheński and Pukowiec streets. It belongs to the Railway Lines Branch of PKP Polskie Linie Kolejowe in Sosnowiec. The station consists of a single high platform with two edges, accessible via an underground passage from Pukowiec Street.

== History ==
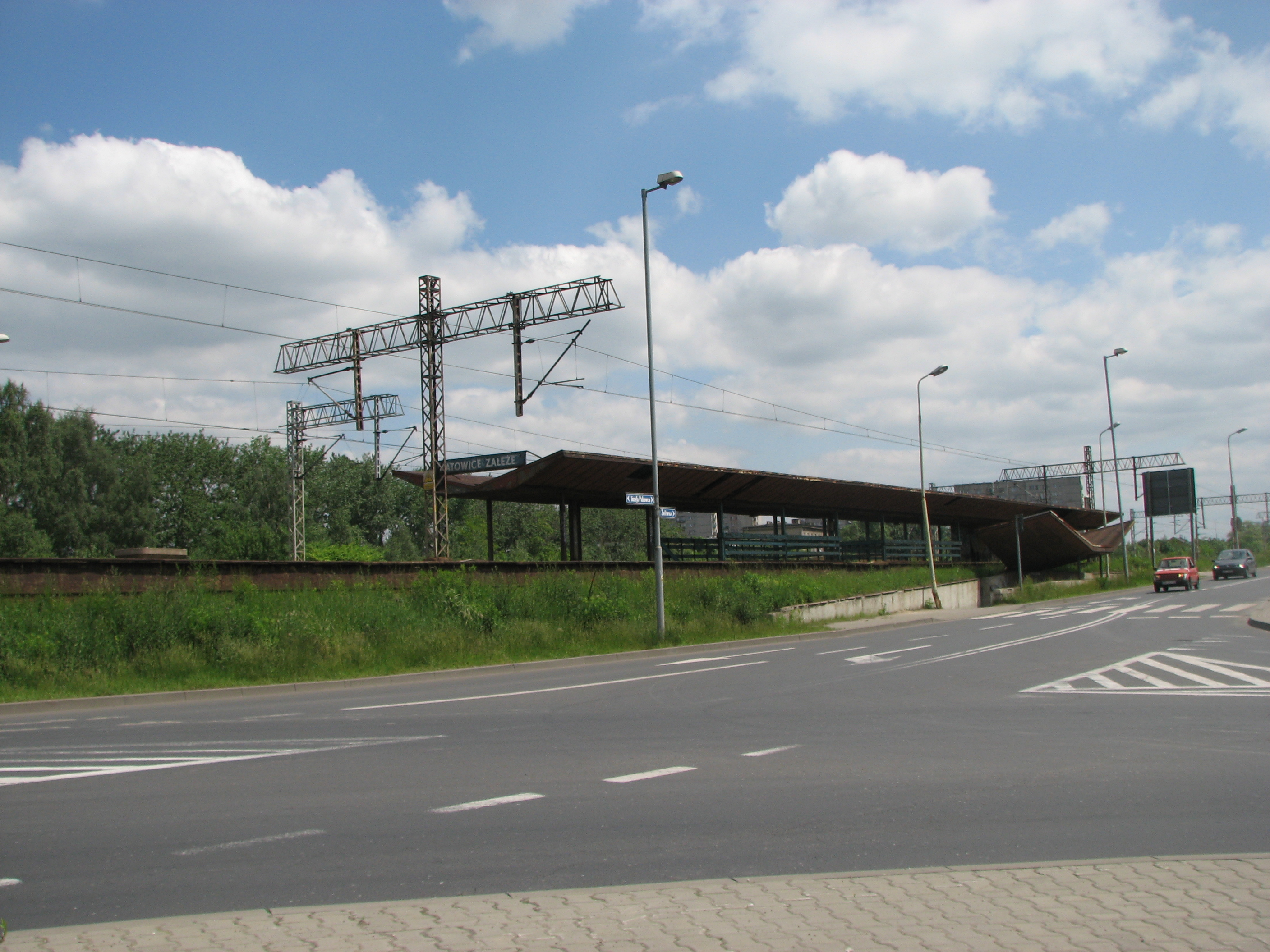
Katowice Załęże railway station before modernization (2008)

The Katowice Załęże station was established on a railway line originally built by the Upper Silesian Railway company, which connected Wrocław to Mysłowice. In 1835, geodetic work was conducted on the Siemianowice–Roździeń–Bieruń Nowy section, but the route was later changed, likely due to the efforts of Franz von Winckler, who relocated the management of his estates to Katowice. The Wrocław–Mysłowice line was opened in stages, with the Świętochłowice–Katowice–Mysłowice section inaugurated on 3 October 1846.

In 1859, a freight station called Kattowitz Güterbahnhof (renamed Katowice Towarowa in 1922) was built near the station. Today, it serves as a junction point where two railway lines, 137 and 713, intersect. The Katowice Załęże station itself was constructed in 1957. In its early years, it was not used by scheduled trains. Regular passenger train service at this station only began in 1966.

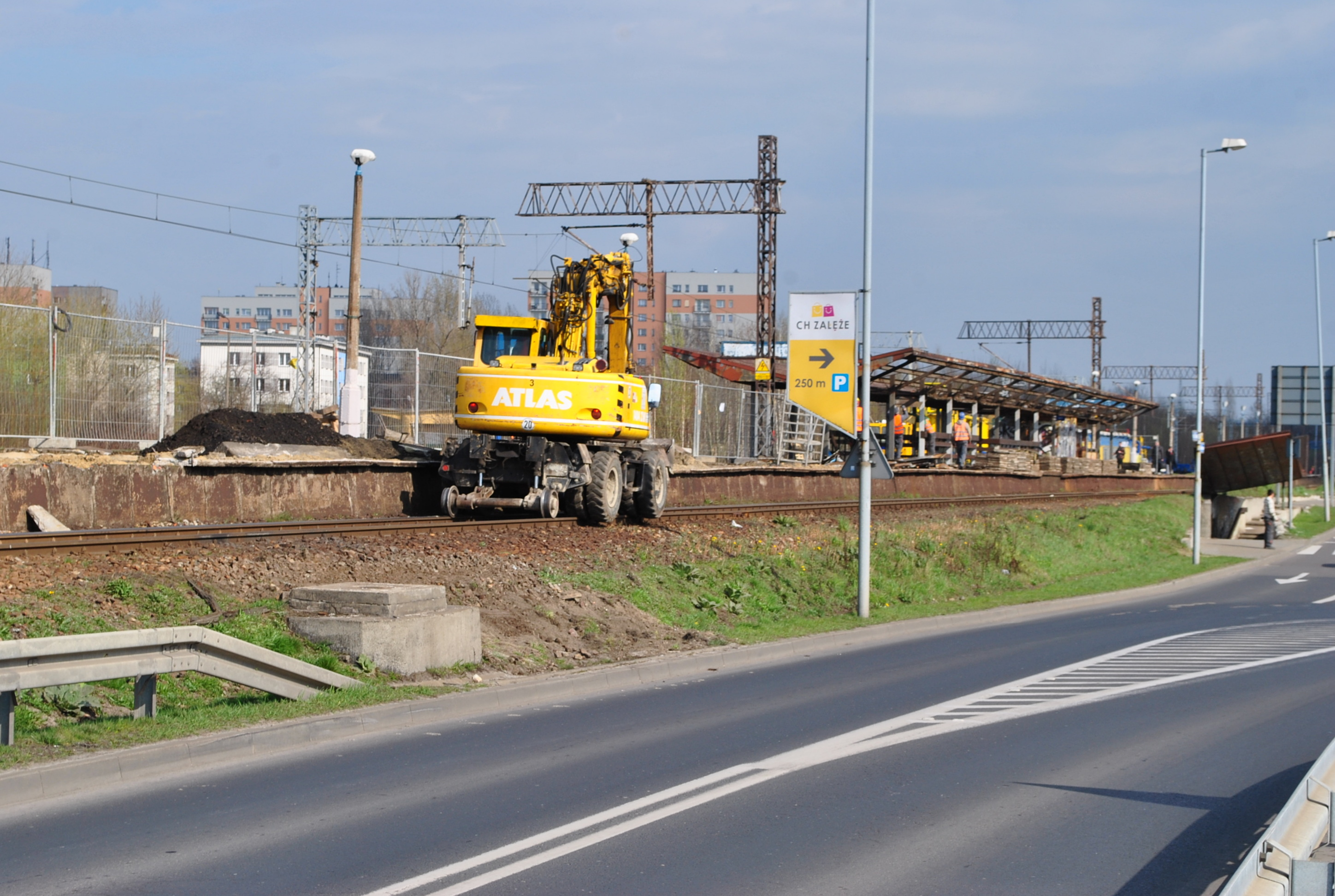
Platform undergoing modernization (April 2015)

Over the years, the technical condition of the station and its accompanying infrastructure deteriorated. It wasn't until 14 November 2014 that PKP Polskie Linie Kolejowe announced a tender for the revitalization of the Katowice–Chorzów Batory railway line no. 137, which included a complete overhaul of the Katowice Załęże station. The renovation plan involved demolishing old elements such as the small architectural features (including an open waiting room and a closed ticket office), the platform surface, railings, and the roof. A new platform was to be built, along with the reconstruction of underground installations, and the platform was to receive a new surface. The platform walls were to be made of concrete, with edge tiles designed to assist visually impaired individuals, and the platform surface was to be replaced with concrete paving stones instead of the existing concrete slabs. New stainless steel railings, a new lighting system, passenger information devices (including speakers and clocks), and new small architectural elements such as trash bins, information boards, station name signs, pictograms, and directional signs were planned. The new shelter was to be made of steel, with a gabled roof.

On 6 March 2015, the tender for the railway line modernization, including the station, was awarded to the Kraków-based company ZUE. Construction work on this section, including the station, began on April 8 of the same year. By the end of July, the northern edge of the platform and the shelter structure over the passage between the street and platforms were completed. During this time, work continued on the second edge of the platform and in the underground passage. By early October 2015, the work at the station was nearing completion. By then, the platform, shelters, underground passage, and new small architectural elements had been modernized. Only finishing touches, such as connecting the lighting, remained. The modernization work at the stop was completed by 30 November 2015.

== Infrastructure ==
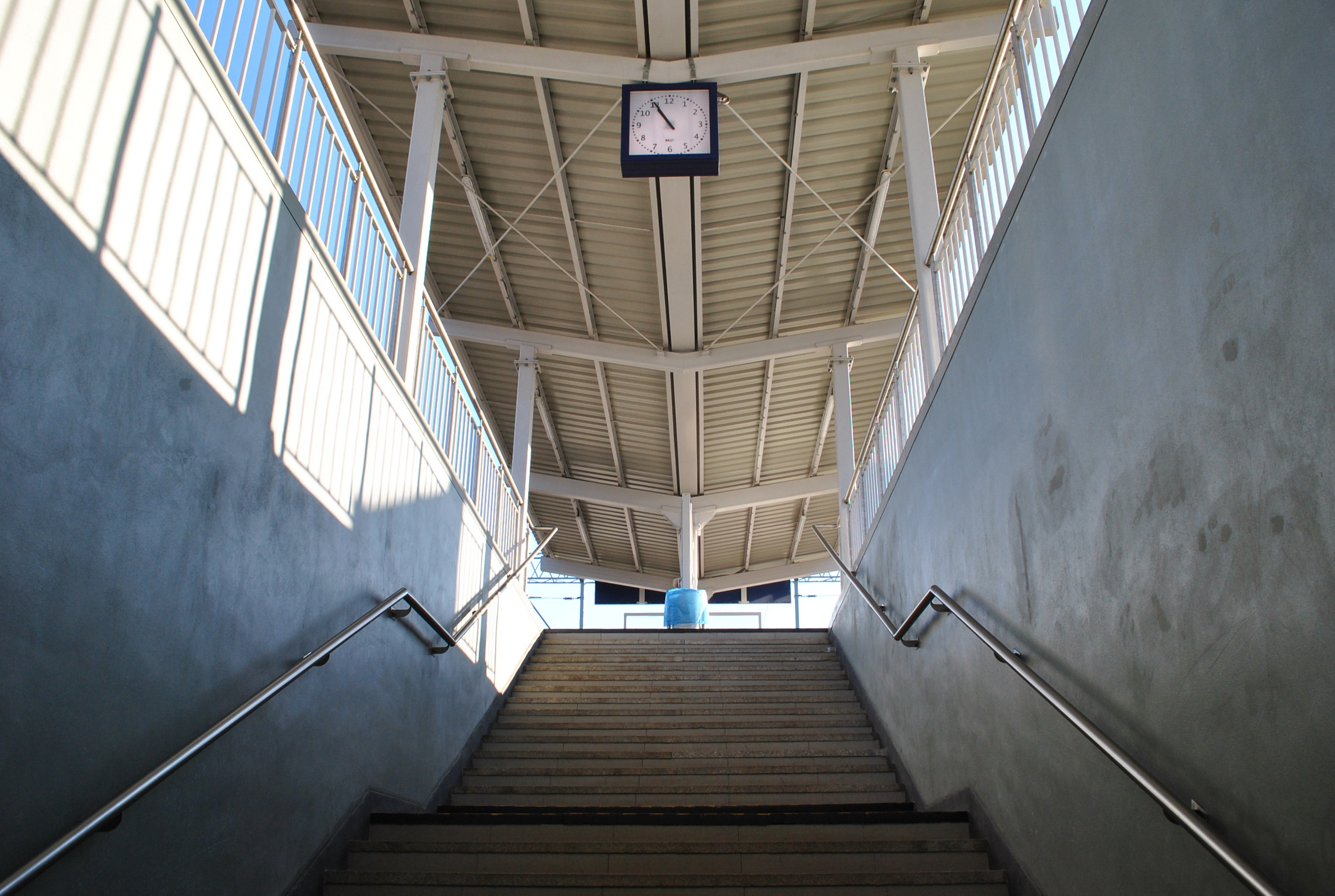
Underground passage to the platform

The Katowice Załęże railway station consists of a high island platform with two edges, standing 0.76 m tall, 303 m long, and covering an area of approximately 2,765 m². The platform surface is hardened and made of concrete paving stones. It is partially covered and equipped with benches. Access to the platform is provided through two pedestrian crossings and a reinforced concrete underground passage under the tracks from Pukowiec Street, measuring 2.4 m in height (directly under the tracks) and 11.56 m in length (without stairs on the street side).

The station is situated on Katowice–Legnica railway (part of the international railway line E30; the 2nd traffic post; 2.528 km). Additionally, at the station's location, Katowice–Chorzów Batory railway line also runs through the Katowice Towarowa station.

The mileage of the start, axis, and end of the stop on Katowice–Legnica railway is presented in the table below:

| Number | Name | Km of the stop | | |
| Number | Name | start | axis | end |
|---|---|---|---|---|
| 137 | Katowice–Legnica railway | 2,378 | 2,528 | 2,678 |

== Connections ==
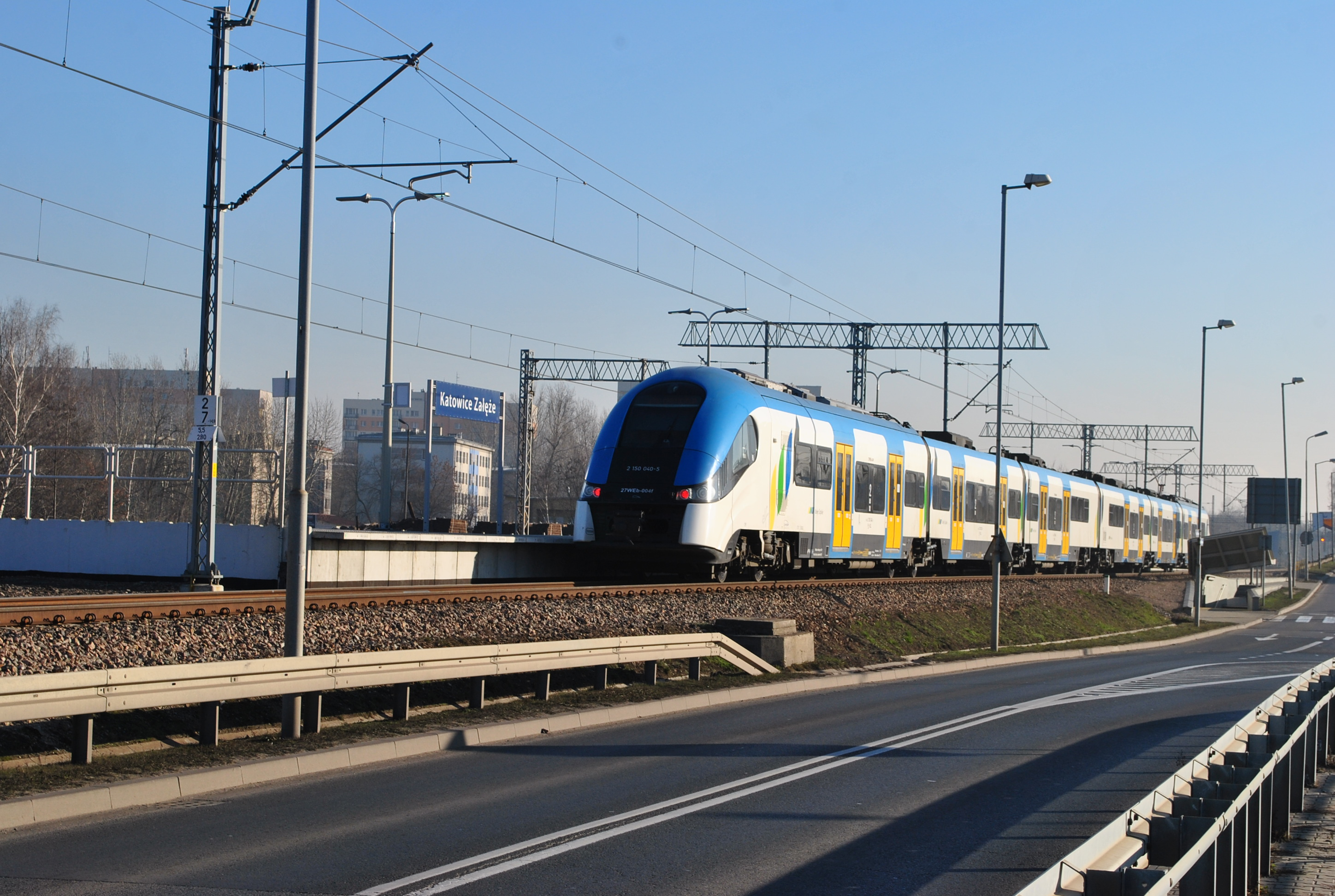
Train 27WEb of Silesian Railways heading towards Katowice

The Katowice Załęże railway station serves as a regional station. During the 2013/2014 period, over 85 regional connections operated by Silesian Railways stopped here. The main destinations during this time included Częstochowa, Gliwice (line S1), Katowice (lines S1 and S8), and Lubliniec (line S8). In November 2014, the average travel times were as follows: 1 hour and 48 minutes to Częstochowa, 30 minutes to Gliwice, 4 minutes to Katowice, and 1 hour and 52 minutes to Lubliniec.

Before 2011, passenger services were provided by Przewozy Regionalne. On 1 October 2011, Silesian Railways took over the operation of the Gliwice–Katowice–Częstochowa route passing through this station. On 9 December 2013, the company also took over connections to Tarnowskie Góry, initially without a stop at Załęże. These trains began stopping at this station only from mid-2013.

== Transport links ==
The station has convenient road connections due to its proximity to Bocheński Street, a road junction connecting the A4 motorway, Drogowa Trasa Średnicowa, and National Road No. 79. Additionally, parking spaces are available near the station.

About 400 meters south of the station is the Załęże Bocheńskiego bus stop, served by bus line 70 under the management of the Metropolitan Transportation Authority. As of November 2020, two pairs of connections per hour stopped here during peak times. About 700 meters north is the Załęże Dwór tram stop, where tram lines 7, 20, and 43 stopped in November 2020.
