= Dzierżoniów Śląski railway station =

Railway station in Poland

Dzierżoniów Śląski
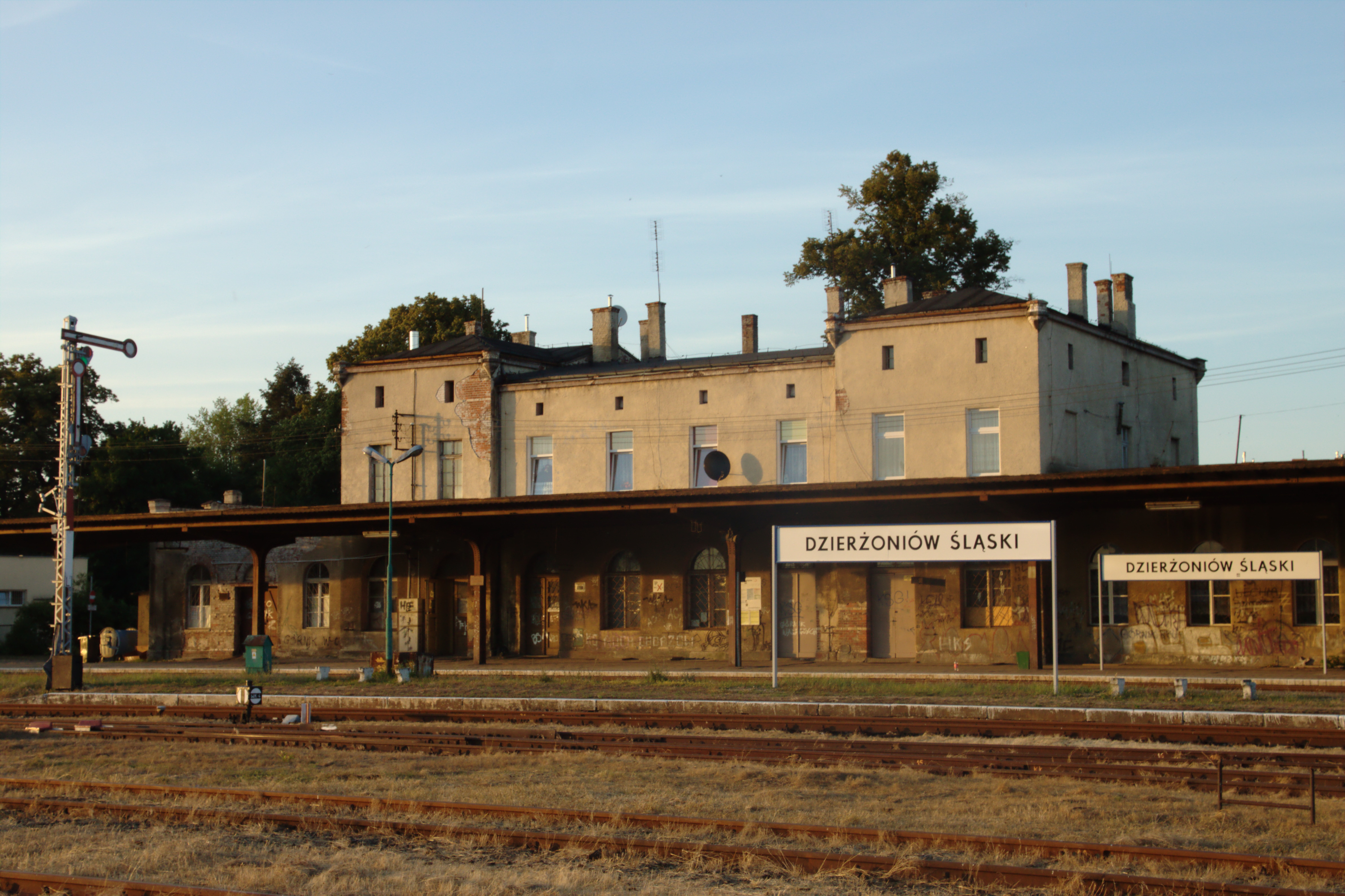
- Dzierżoniów Śląski railway station in 2013

General information
- Location: Dzierżoniów, Lower Silesian Voivodeship; Poland
- Coordinates: 50°43′28.6320″N 16°38′26.0520″E
- Owner: Polskie Linie Kolejowe
- Lines: Katowice–Legnica; Dzierżoniów–Bielawa
- Platforms: 2
- Tracks: 3
- Train operators: PKP Intercity; Lower Silesian Railways

History
- Opened: 1855
- Former names: Reichenbach (before 1914); Reichenbach (Eulengebirge) (1914–1945); Drobniszów (1945–1946); Dzierżoniów (1946–1947)
Location
- Location within Poland Location within Lower Silesian Voivodeship

Dzierżoniów Śląski railway station is a railway station in Dzierżoniów, in the Lower Silesian Voivodeship in Poland, located on Henryka Sienkiewicza Street.

== History ==
The railway station under the name Reichenbach was opened in 1855, shortly thereafter the station building as well. It bore this name until 1945, when it was changed to Rychbach, and in 1947 to Dzierżoniów Śląski. In 2013, the station building was taken over by the city free of charge. In 2018, the Lower Silesian Voivodeship authorities took over from PKP S.A. the Dzierżoniów–Bielawa railway line, which had been inactive since 2001. On 4 February 2019, the Sowiogórskie Communication Center was opened on the station premises.

As of 15 December 2019, the station obtained a direct connection to Bielawa Zachodnia, restored after 40 years.

== Passenger traffic ==
Year	Passenger exchange per day
2017	300-499
2018	300-499
2019	500-699
2020	300-499
2021	300-499
2022	500-699
2023	500-699

== Description ==
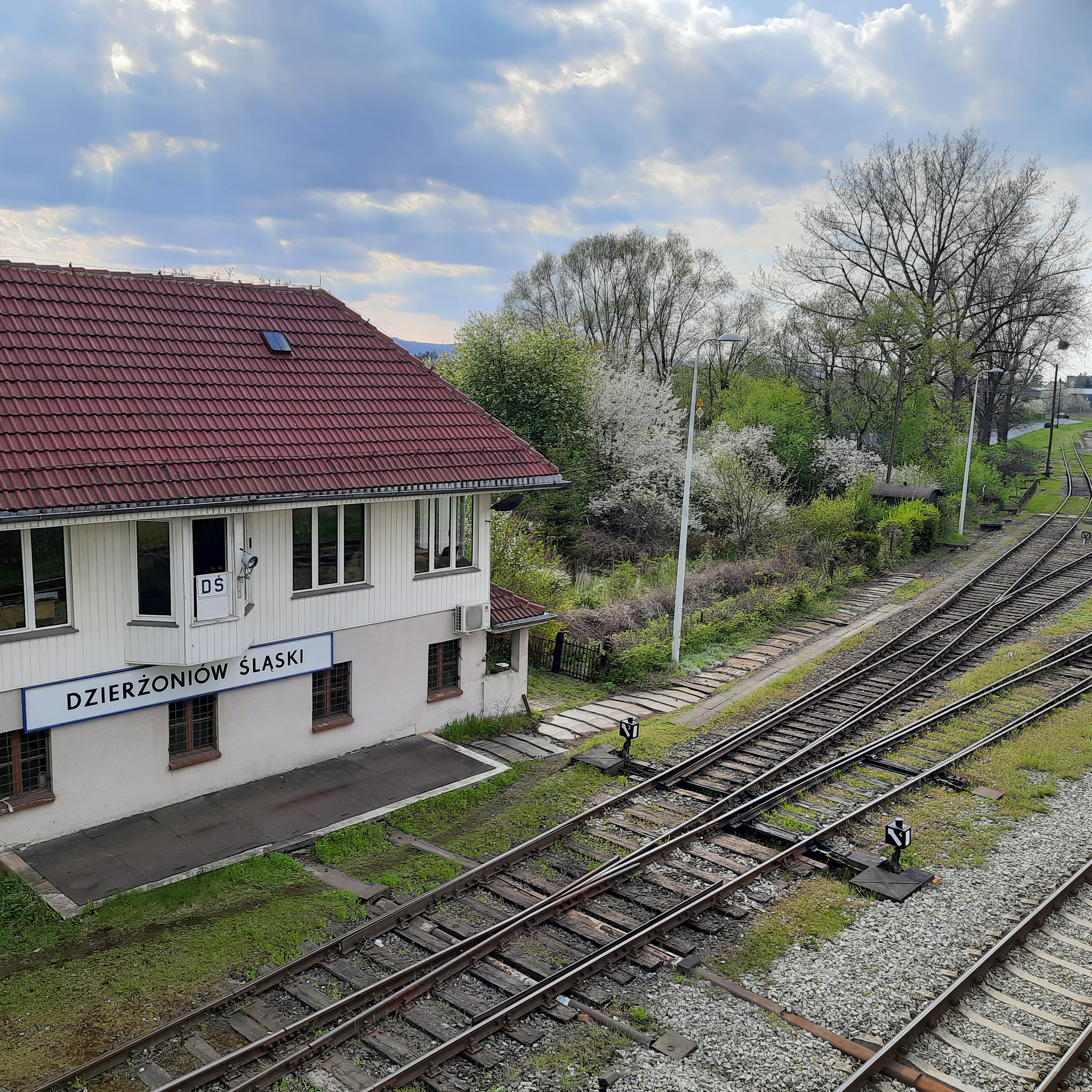
DŚ signal box

In 2018, a general renovation of the building and its surroundings was carried out. After the renovation, it is to be named the Sowiogórskie Communication Center. The total cost, including the transfer center, which encompasses bus stops, amounts to 20 million zlotys. The station has two platforms connected by an underpass. The upper floor of the building was adapted into a hostel. On the ground floor, there is a waiting room with a children's corner. Plans also include relocating the district police offices here, setting up a restaurant, and arranging departure points for city buses and minibuses.
