= Krnov–Głuchołazy railway =

Railway line in the Czech Republic and Poland

Krnov–Głuchołazy
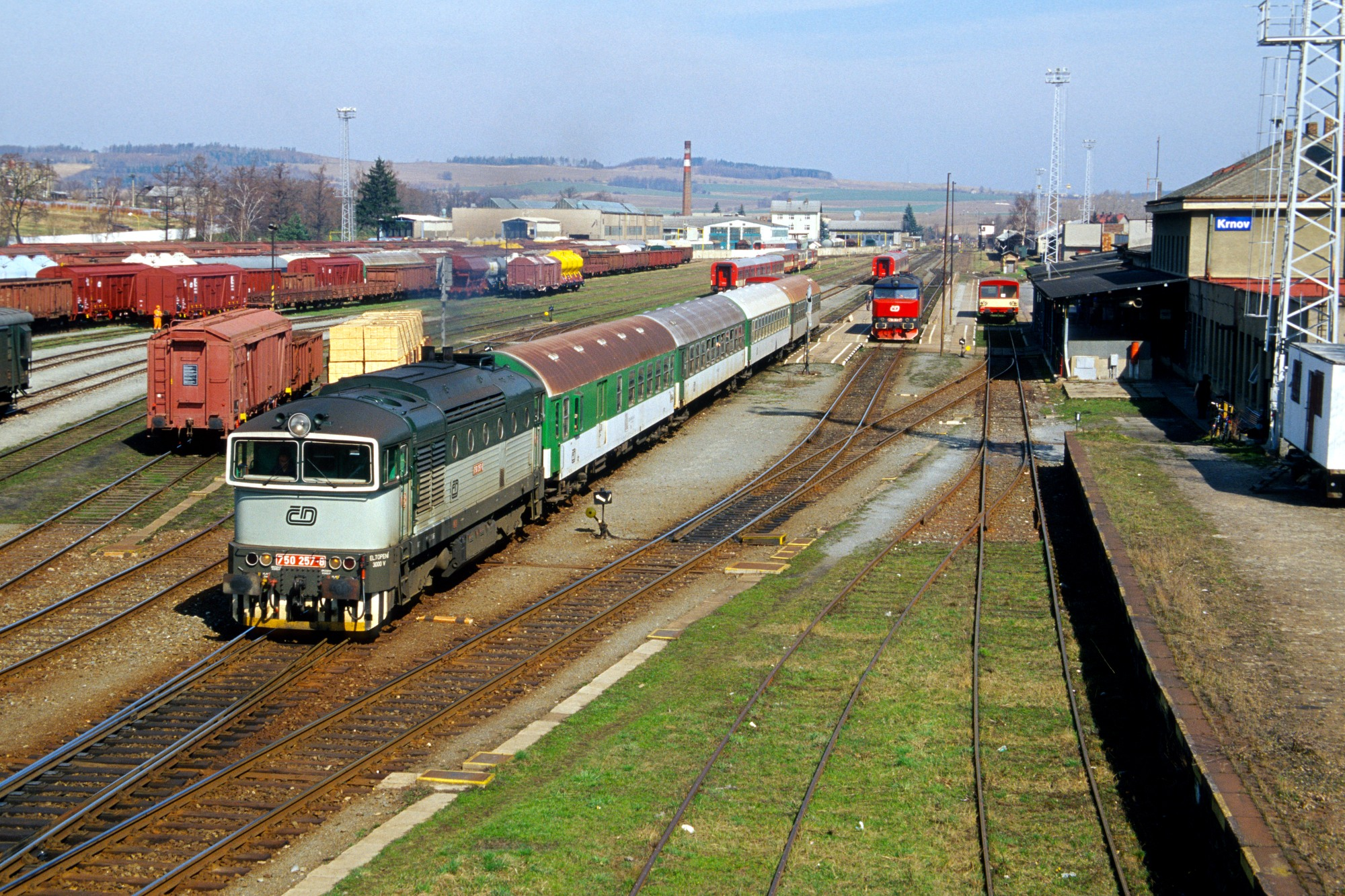
- Krnov station in 2001 with a ČD Class 750 diesel locomotive

Service
- Route number: 292

Technical
- Line length: 37.698 km
- Track gauge: 1,435 mm (4 ft 8 1/2 in) standard gauge
- Operating speed: 80 km/h max.

Krnov–Głuchołazy railway is a main and branch line for railway transport in the Czech Republic and Poland. Originally it was built and operated by Mährisch-Schlesische Centralbahn (MSCB). It is a north–south railway line between Krnov and Głuchołazy, which runs parallel with the border between the two countries.

== History ==
On 21 April 1870 MSCB gained concession to build a railway between Olomouc and Leobschütz via Krnov (Jägerndorf). Concession also included the rights for creating a branch line from Město Albrechtice to Würbenthal in Prussia via Neisse, Opava, Rýmařov.

On 1 October 1872 the line between Olomouc and Krnov–Hanušovice was temporarily opened for freight traffic as well. Not so much later, on 15 October it was opened for passenger transport as well. Line on the other side of the border is operating since 1 December 1875.

MSCB was nationalised on 1 January 1895. The new owner and operator was the Imperial Royal Austrian State Railways. There were three pair of trains between Krnov–Olomouc and Šumperk. These train connections are available between Ziegenhals and Frývaldov/Freiwaldau (from 1947 Jeseník) or Hanušovice today as well.

After World War I line was transferred from Austria to Czechoslovakia and the line was operated by Czechoslovak State Railways (ČSD).

After Nazi Germany annexed Sudetenland, the line was transferred to German Reich Railway. On the timetables of those times it was shown as line 151 between Brieg–Neisse–Jägerndorf–Schönbrunn-Witkowitz.

After World War II operating of the line was divided between ČSD and Polish State Railways (PKP). There are corridor rails between the two countries which connect Krnov–Jeseník with the Polish territories. As all trains had to stop in Głuchołazy to change its locomotive. And there was no passenger traffic here up to 2006.

As Czechoslovakia was dissolved on 1 January 1993, all vehicles and the line were transferred to the new České dráhy (ČD).

There is mainly only passenger transport to Jeseník. There are express trains on the line in every four hours between Ostrava-Svinov–Jeseník. There is only local transport from Krnov to Jindřichov. Transit traffic includes only some trains to jelenti.
