= Ruda Śląska railway station =

Railway station in Poland

Ruda Śląska
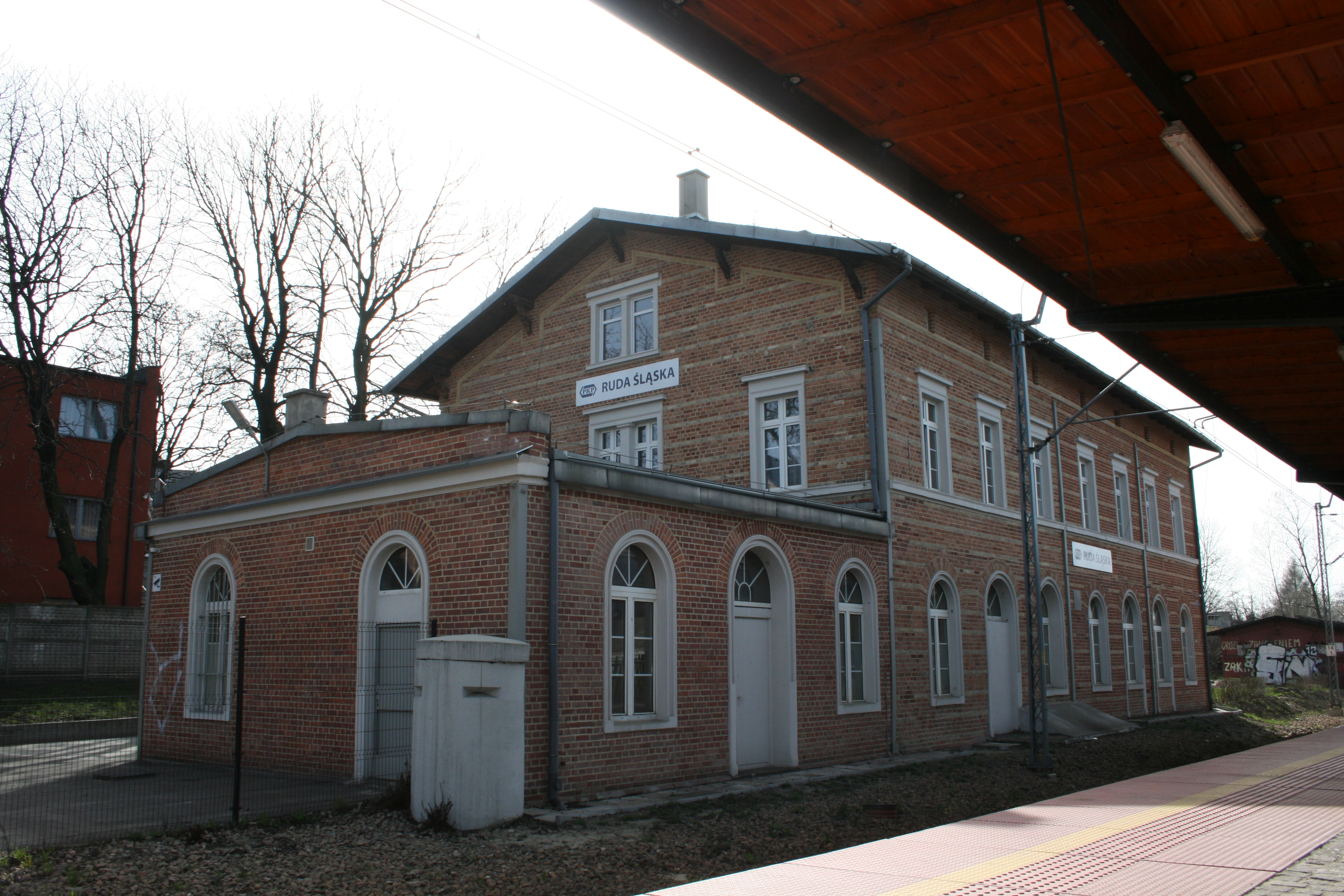
- Station building

General information
- Location: Ruda Śląska, Silesian Voivodeship; Poland
- Coordinates: 50°18′57″N 18°51′02″E
- Owner: Polish State Railways
- Platforms: 2

Services
Preceding station	KŚ	Following station
Zabrze towards Gliwice	S1	Ruda Chebzie towards Częstochowa
Location

Ruda Śląska railway station is a railway station in Ruda Śląska, Poland. As of 2026, it is served by Silesian Railways on the Gliwice–Częstochowa route, calling at Katowice and Zawiercie.

== History ==
The station opened on 15 November 1845 as Ruda. In 1928 the station was renamed to Ruda Śląska.
