= Kamieniec Ząbkowicki railway station =

Railway station in Poland

Kamieniec Ząbkowicki
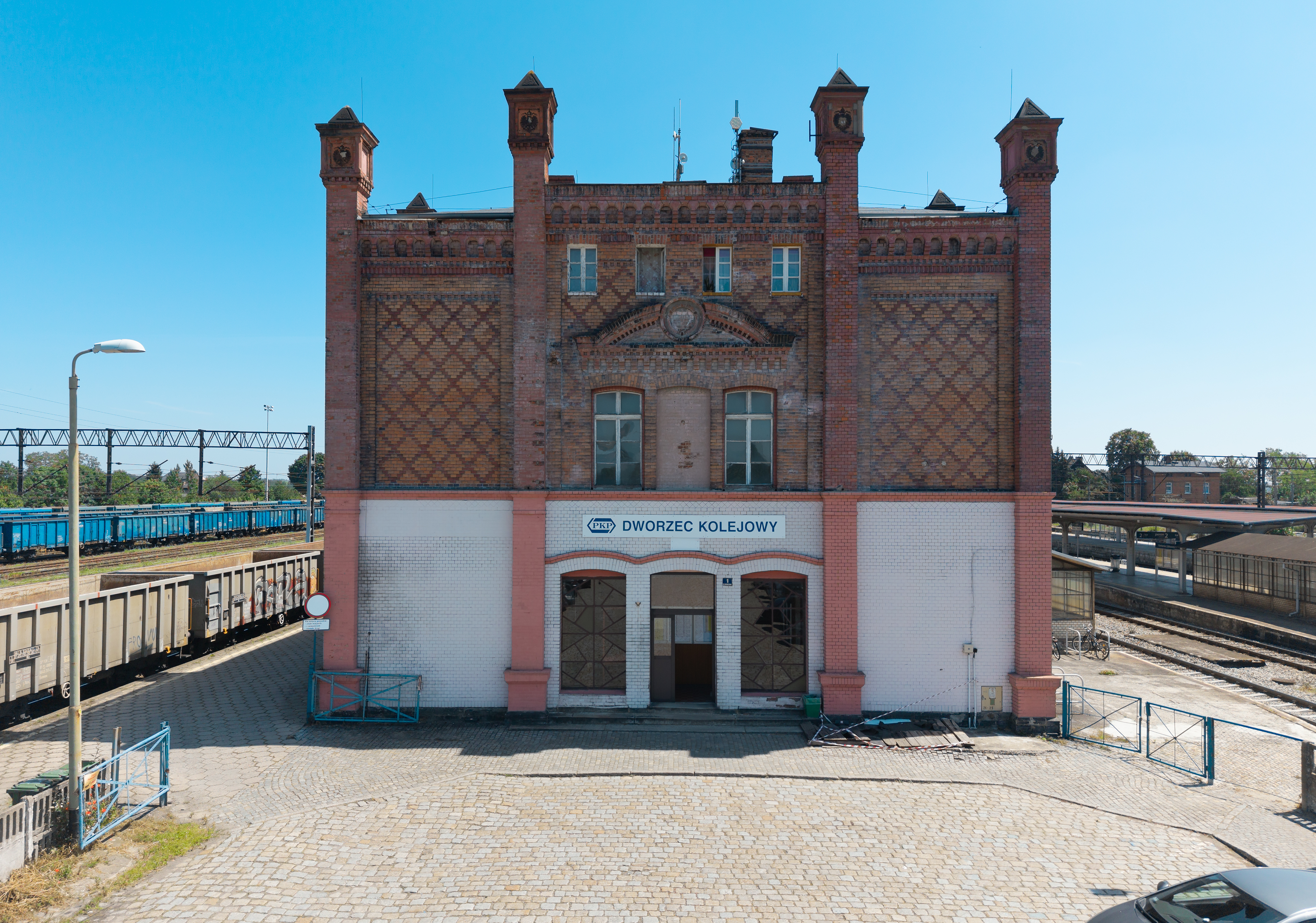
- Kamieniec Ząbkowicki station building in 2025

General information
- Location: Kamieniec Ząbkowicki, Lower Silesian Voivodeship; Poland
- Coordinates: 50°32′10.4″N 16°53′53.7″E
- Owner: Polish State Railways
- Lines: Wrocław–Międzylesie; Katowice–Legnica; Kamieniec Ząbkowicki–Złoty Stok (closed in 1997)
- Platforms: 4
- Tracks: 6
- Train operators: PKP Intercity; Lower Silesian Railways; Polregio

History
- Opened: 1873
- Electrified: 1991
- Former names: Camenz (to 1936); Kamenz (to 1945); Kamieniec nad Ochną (to 1947)
Location
- Location within Poland Location within Lower Silesian Voivodeship

Kamieniec Ząbkowicki is a railway station in Kamieniec Ząbkowicki, in the Lower Silesian Voivodeship in southern Poland. According to the PKP classification, it is categorized as a local station.

== History ==
In 1873, a railway line from Wrocław through Kłodzko to Międzylesie was constructed through Kamieniec, and in 1874, the Legnica – Nysa railway line (currently the Sudeten Main Line) was built, thereby making the station an important transport hub.

In the years 1945–1947, the station was called Kamieniec nad Ochną.

The educational trail in the Sudeten Foothills ends at the station – this is its 17th (last) stop. At the station, one can also encounter railbuses owned by the Lower Silesian Voivodeship running from Kłodzko to Legnica. Between 2008 and 2018, the section from Kamieniec Ząbkowicki to Nysa was closed to passenger traffic. In December 2018, Przewozy Regionalne restored connections on this section, but only on weekends. Since December 2020, InterCity trains on the Kamieniec Ząbkowicki – Nysa route have offered daily long-distance connections: Kraków Główny – Jelenia Góra and Polanica-Zdrój – Olsztyn Główny. This has once again provided residents with connections to Nysa, Katowice, Warsaw, and Kraków.

In December 2020, the renovation of the station building was announced.

== Accidents and incidents ==
- On 9 August 2022, at 3 am, a freight train derailed on the 5th track of the station. 7 wagons loaded with aggregate were derailed, including one falling over the station access road.

== Passenger traffic ==
Year	Passenger exchange per day
2017	300-499
2022	500-699
