= Goświnowice =

- Village
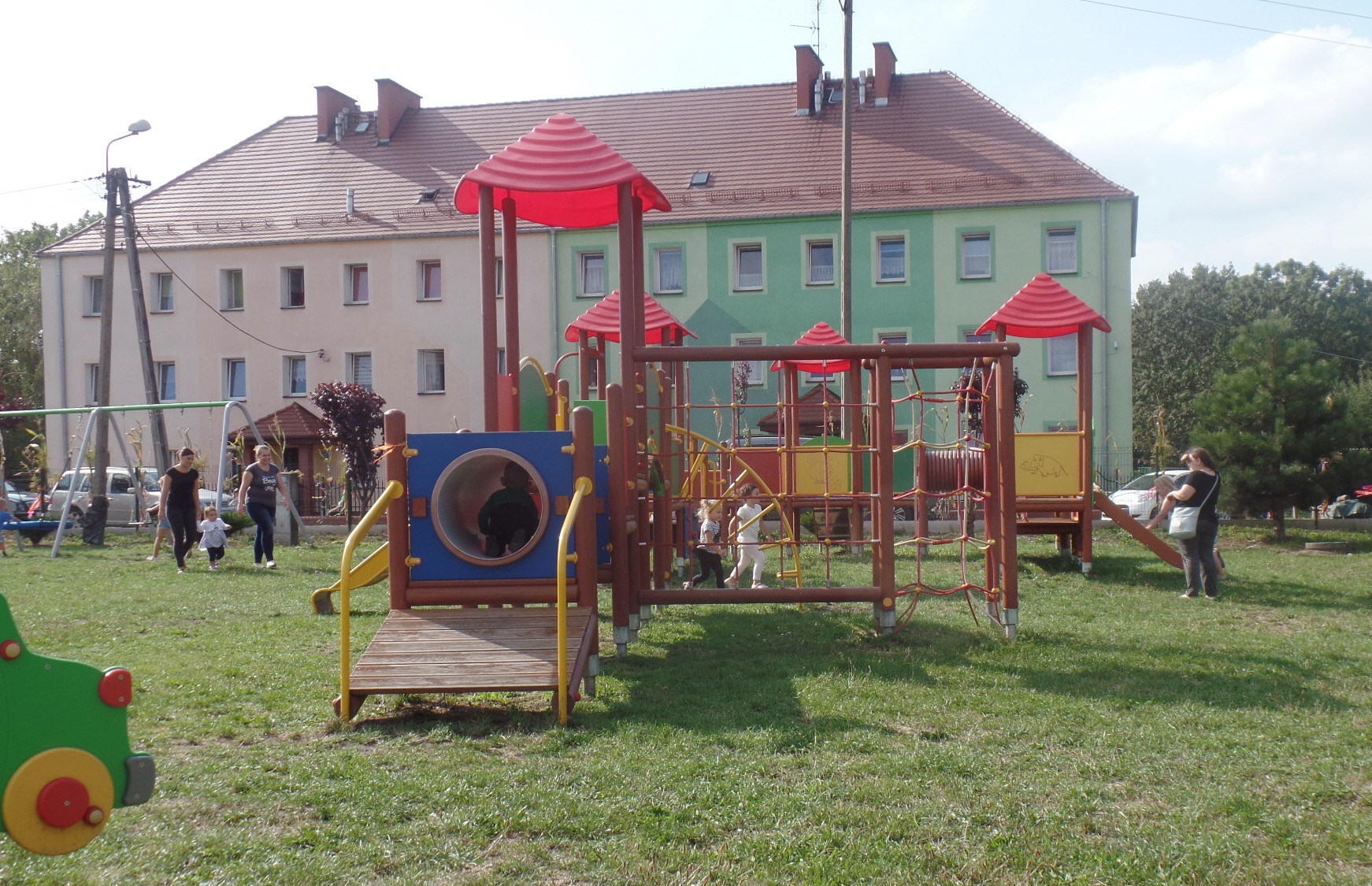

- Location within Poland
- Coordinates: 50°29′15″N 17°15′11″E
- Country: Poland
- Voivodeship: Opole
- County: Nysa
- Gmina: Nysa

Goświnowice [ɡɔɕfinɔˈvit͡sɛ] (German: Giessmannsdorf) is a village in the administrative district of Gmina Nysa, within Nysa County, Opole Voivodeship, in south-western Poland.
