= Przecza railway station =

Railway station in Przecza, Poland

Przecza

General information
- Location: Przecza, Opole Voivodeship; Poland
- Coordinates: 50.4717°N 17.3308°E
- Owner: Polskie Koleje Państwowe S.A.
- Platforms: 2

History
- Opened: 1843
- Former names: Arnsdorf (Oberschlesien), Przycza

Services
Preceding station	Polregio	Following station
Lewin Brzeski towards Wrocław Główny	PR	Dąbrowa Niemodlińska towards Opole Główne, Kędzierzyn-Koźle, Racibórz or Gliwice
Lewin Brzeski towards Brzeg	PR	Dąbrowa Niemodlińska towards Opole Główne or Kędzierzyn-Koźle
Location
- Location within Poland

Przecza railway station is a station in Przecza, Opole Voivodeship, Poland.

== Connections ==
- 132 Bytom - Wrocław Główny

== Train services ==
The station is served by the following service(s):

- Regional services (R) Wrocław Główny - Oława - Brzeg - Opole Główne
- Regional service (PR) Wrocław - Oława - Brzeg - Opole Główne - Kędzierzyn-Koźle
- Regional service (PR) Wrocław - Oława - Brzeg - Opole Główne - Kędzierzyn-Koźle - Racibórz
- Regional service (PR) Wrocław - Oława - Brzeg - Opole Główne - Gliwice
- Regional service (PR) Brzeg - Opole
- Regional service (PR) Brzeg - Opole - Kędzierzyn-Koźle
