= Święta Katarzyna railway station =

Railway station in Lower Silesian Voivodeship, Poland

Święta Katarzyna
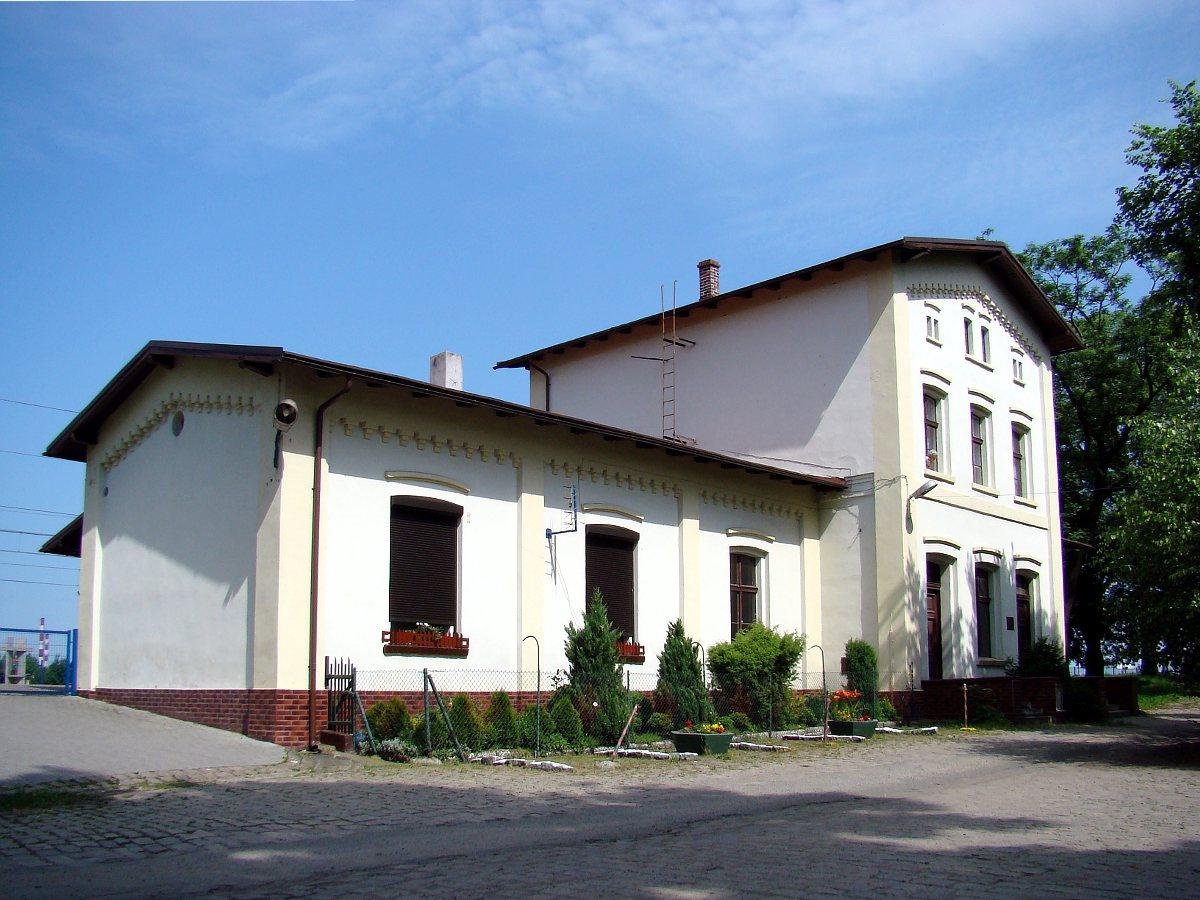

General information
- Location: Święta Katarzyna, Lower Silesian Voivodeship; Poland
- Coordinates: 51.0147°N 17.0722°E
- Owner: Polskie Koleje Państwowe S.A.
- Platforms: 2

History
- Opened: 1842
- Former names: Cattern, Kattern, Katarzynin

Services
Preceding station	Polregio	Following station
Wrocław Brochów towards Wrocław Główny	PR	Zębice Wrocławskie towards Brzeg, Nysa, Opole Główne, Kędzierzyn-Koźle, Racibórz or Gliwice
Location
- Location within Poland Location within Lower Silesian Voivodeship

Święta Katarzyna railway station is a station in Święta Katarzyna, Lower Silesian Voivodeship, Poland.

The Święta Katarzyna - Wrocław Kuźniki railway line (349), serving as the railway bypass of Wrocław, begins at Święta Katarzyna railway station. The railway station underwent extensive renovation in 2006, when outlying and unused buildings were deconstructed, including a spur towards Oława, whilst the westerly track heading towards Wrocław Brochów was moved to accommodate the construction of a new platform, for passengers heading to the aforesaid railway station.

== Connections ==
- 132 Bytom - Wrocław Główny
- 349 Święta Katarzyna - Wrocław Kuźniki

== Train Services ==
The station is served by the following service(s):

- Regional services (PR) Wrocław Główny - Oława - Brzeg
- Regional services (PR) Wrocław Główny - Oława - Brzeg - Nysa
- Regional service (PR) Wrocław - Oława - Brzeg - Nysa - Kędzierzyn-Koźle
- Regional services (PR) Wrocław Główny - Oława - Brzeg - Opole Główne
- Regional service (PR) Wrocław - Oława - Brzeg - Opole Główne - Kędzierzyn-Koźle
- Regional service (PR) Wrocław - Oława - Brzeg - Opole Główne - Kędzierzyn-Koźle - Racibórz
- Regional service (PR) Wrocław - Oława - Brzeg - Opole Główne - Gliwice
