= Zębice Wrocławskie railway station =

Railway station in Zębice, Poland

Zębice Wrocławskie
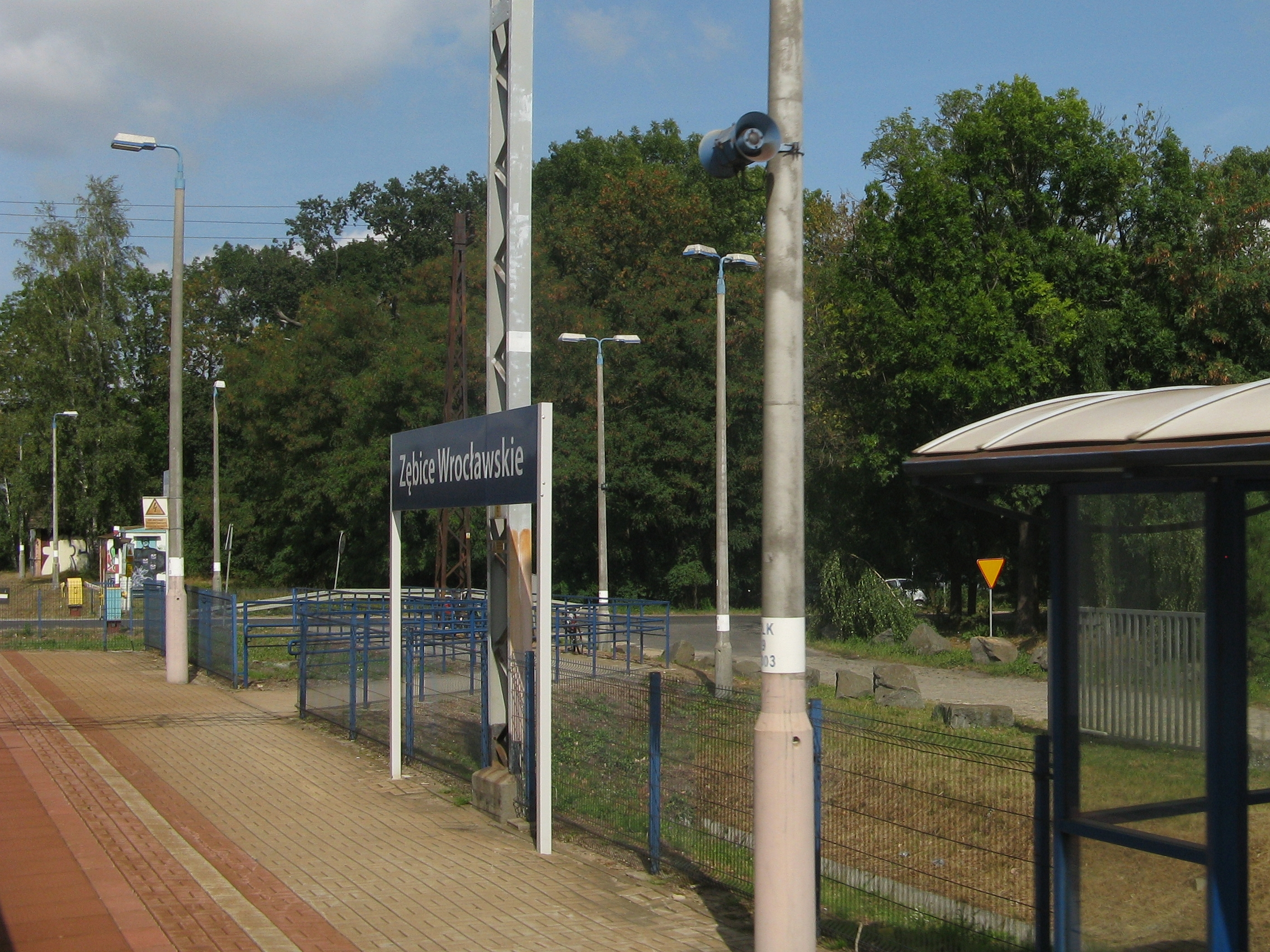

General information
- Location: Wrocław County, Zębice, Lower Silesian Voivodeship; Poland
- Coordinates: 51.0023°N 17.0943°E
- Owner: Polskie Koleje Państwowe S.A.
- Platforms: 2

History
- Opened: 1842
- Former names: Sambowitz, Seydlitzaue, Siedleczko, Zębice

Services
Preceding station	Polregio	Following station
Święta Katarzyna towards Wrocław Główny	PR	Lizawice towards Brzeg, Nysa, Opole Główne, Kędzierzyn-Koźle, Racibórz or Gliwice
Location
- Location within Poland Location within Lower Silesian Voivodeship

Zębice Wrocławskie railway station is a station in Zębice, Lower Silesian Voivodeship, Poland. Prior to World War II, the railway station constituted a building, destroyed due to war operations. After the war, the building was replaced by a metal shack.

The railway station was renovated in 2008.

== Connections ==
- 132 Bytom - Wrocław Główny
