= Lipki railway station =

Railway station in Opole Voivodeship, Poland

Lipki
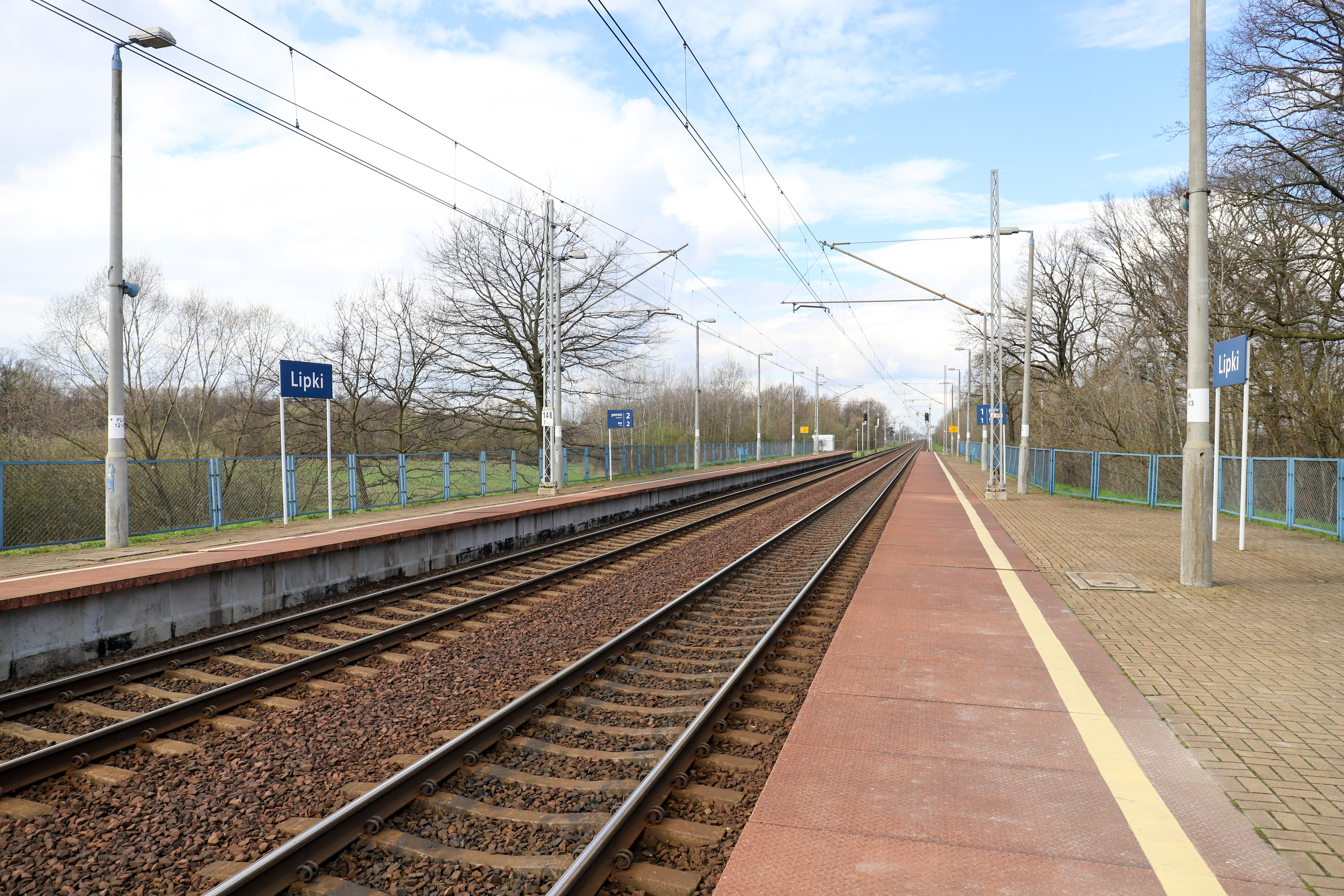
- Station in March 2024

General information
- Location: Lipki, Opole Voivodeship; Poland
- Coordinates: 50.5353°N 17.2221°E
- Owner: Polskie Koleje Państwowe S.A.
- Line: Bytom–Wrocław railway
- Platforms: 2

History
- Opened: 1842, modernised 2003
- Former names: Linden, Lipick

Services
Preceding station	Polregio	Following station
Oława towards Wrocław Główny	PR	Brzeg towards Brzeg, Nysa, Opole Główne, Kędzierzyn-Koźle, Racibórz or Gliwice
Location
- Location within Poland

Lipki is a railway station in Lipki, Opole Voivodeship, Poland.

== Train services ==
The station is served by the following service(s):

- Regional services (PR) Wrocław Główny - Oława - Brzeg
- Regional services (PR) Wrocław Główny - Oława - Brzeg - Nysa
- Regional service (PR) Wrocław - Oława - Brzeg - Nysa - Kędzierzyn-Koźle
- Regional services (PR) Wrocław Główny - Oława - Brzeg - Opole Główne
- Regional service (PR) Wrocław - Oława - Brzeg - Opole Główne - Kędzierzyn-Koźle
- Regional service (PR) Wrocław - Oława - Brzeg - Opole Główne - Kędzierzyn-Koźle - Racibórz
- Regional service (PR) Wrocław - Oława - Brzeg - Opole Główne - Gliwice
