= Lizawice railway station =

Railway station in Lizawice, Poland

Lizawice
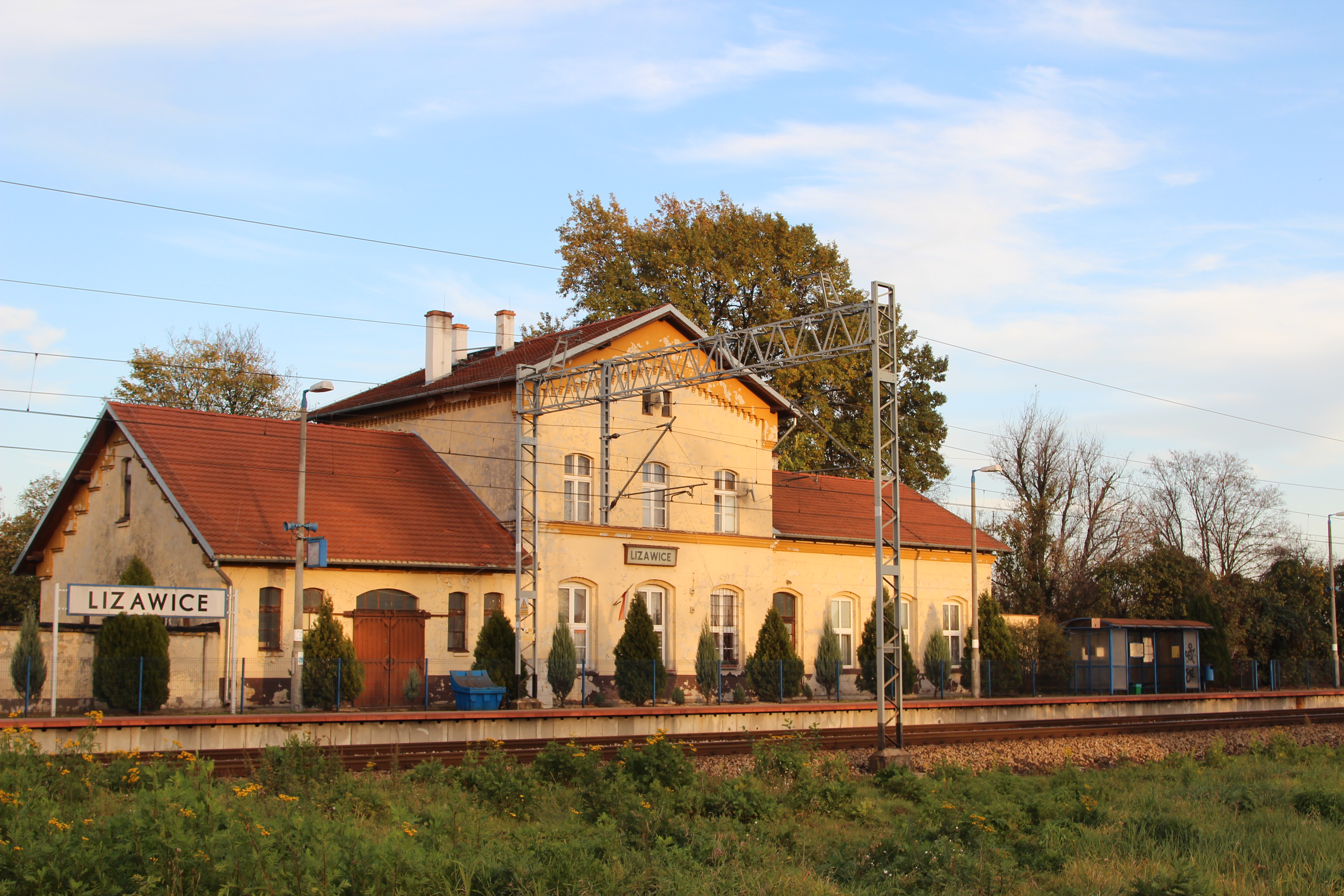

General information
- Location: Lizawice, Lower Silesian Voivodeship; Poland
- Coordinates: 50.5819°N 17.1223°E
- Owner: Polskie Koleje Państwowe S.A.
- Platforms: 2

History
- Opened: 1842
- Former names: Leisewitz, Licajce

Services
| Preceding station | Polregio | Following station |
|---|---|---|
| Zębice Wrocławskie towards Wrocław Główny | PR | Oława towards Brzeg, Nysa, Opole Główne, Kędzierzyn-Koźle, Racibórz or Gliwice |
Location
- Location within Poland Location within Lower Silesian Voivodeship

Lizawice railway station is a station in Lizawice, Lower Silesian Voivodeship, Poland.

== Connections ==
- 132 Bytom - Wrocław Główny

== Train Services ==
The station is served by the following service(s):

- Regional services (PR) Wrocław Główny - Oława - Brzeg
- Regional services (PR) Wrocław Główny - Oława - Brzeg - Nysa
- Regional service (PR) Wrocław - Oława - Brzeg - Nysa - Kędzierzyn-Koźle
- Regional services (PR) Wrocław Główny - Oława - Brzeg - Opole Główne
- Regional service (PR) Wrocław - Oława - Brzeg - Opole Główne - Kędzierzyn-Koźle
- Regional service (PR) Wrocław - Oława - Brzeg - Opole Główne - Kędzierzyn-Koźle - Racibórz
- Regional service (PR) Wrocław - Oława - Brzeg - Opole Główne - Gliwice
