= Opole Zachodnie railway station =

Railway station in Opole, Poland

Opole Zachodnie
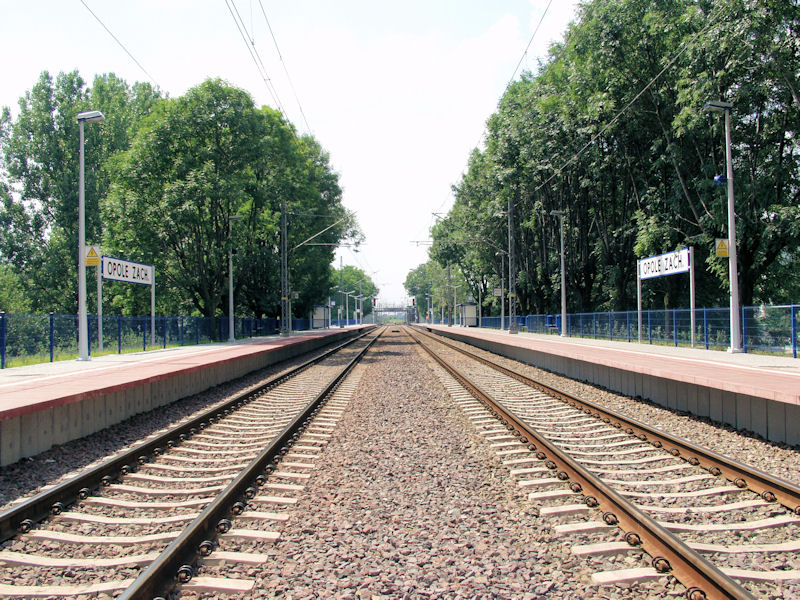

General information
- Location: Opole, Opole Voivodeship; Poland
- Coordinates: 50.3937°N 17.5336°E
- Owner: Polskie Koleje Państwowe S.A.
- Lines: Bytom–Wrocław railway; Opole–Nysa railway
- Platforms: 2

History
- Opened: 1843, modernised 2003
- Former names: Stephanshöh, Oppeln West

Services
| Preceding station | Polregio | Following station |
|---|---|---|
| Chróścina Opolska towards Wrocław Główny | PR | Opole Główne towards Opole Główne, Kędzierzyn-Koźle, Racibórz or Gliwice |
| Chróścina Opolska towards Brzeg | PR | Opole Główne towards Opole Główne or Kędzierzyn-Koźle |
| Opole Chmielowice towards Nysa | PR | Opole Główne towards Opole Główne or Kluczbork |
Location
- Location within Poland

Opole Zachodnie is a railway station in the city of Opole within the Opole Voivodeship in southern Poland. Situated on the western bank of the Oder, an extensive amount of the station is located on a viaduct adjacent to Wojska Polskiego street.

In 2003, the station underwent major renovation works, together with the modernisation of the Bytom–Wrocław railway. The station has high passenger flow for passengers heading to and from Nysa and Wrocław.

== Train services ==
The station is served by the following service(s):

- Regional services (PR) Wrocław Główny - Oława - Brzeg - Opole Główne
- Regional service (PR) Wrocław - Oława - Brzeg - Opole Główne - Kędzierzyn-Koźle
- Regional service (PR) Wrocław - Oława - Brzeg - Opole Główne - Kędzierzyn-Koźle - Racibórz
- Regional service (PR) Wrocław - Oława - Brzeg - Opole Główne - Gliwice
- Regional service (PR) Brzeg - Opole
- Regional service (PR) Brzeg - Opole - Kędzierzyn-Koźle
- Regional services (PR) Opole - Nysa
- Regional services (PR) Kluczbork - Opole - Nysa
