= Łosiów railway station =

Railway station in Łosiów, Poland

Łosiów
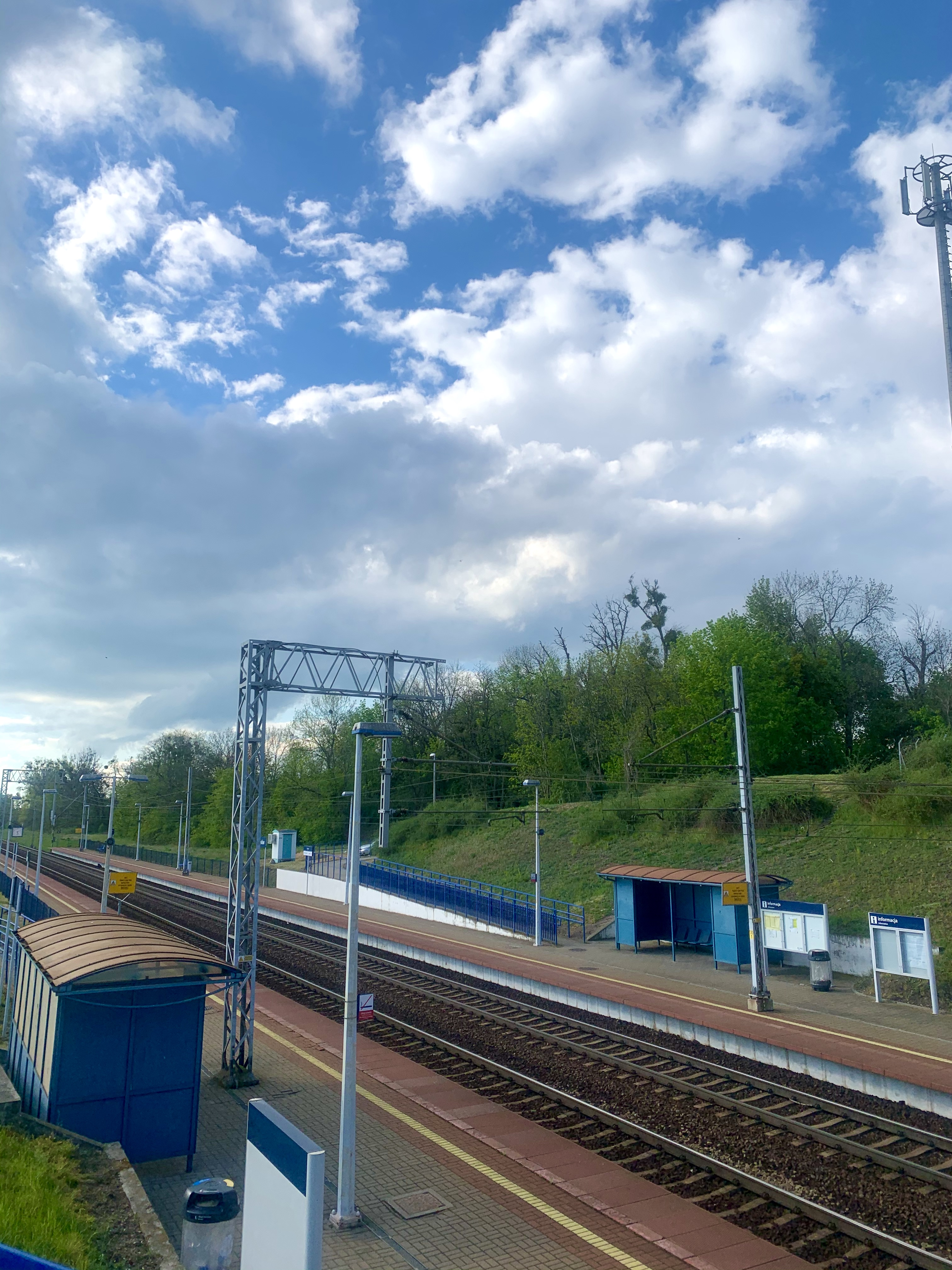

General information
- Location: Łosiów, Opole Voivodeship; Poland
- Coordinates: 50.4717°N 17.3308°E
- Owner: Polskie Koleje Państwowe S.A.
- Platforms: 2

History
- Opened: 1843
- Former names: Lossen

Services
Preceding station	Polregio	Following station
Brzeg towards Wrocław Główny	PR	Lewin Brzeski towards Opole Główne, Kędzierzyn-Koźle, Racibórz or Gliwice
Brzeg Terminus	PR	Lewin Brzeski towards Opole Główne or Kędzierzyn-Koźle
Location
- Location within Poland

Łosiów railway station is a station in Łosiów, Opole Voivodeship, Poland.

== Connections ==
- 132 Bytom - Wrocław Główny

== Train services ==
The station is served by the following service(s):

- Regional services (PR) Wrocław Główny - Oława - Brzeg - Opole Główne
- Regional service (PR) Wrocław - Oława - Brzeg - Opole Główne - Kędzierzyn-Koźle
- Regional service (PR) Wrocław - Oława - Brzeg - Opole Główne - Kędzierzyn-Koźle - Racibórz
- Regional service (PR) Wrocław - Oława - Brzeg - Opole Główne - Gliwice
- Regional service (PR) Brzeg - Opole
- Regional service (PR) Brzeg - Opole - Kędzierzyn-Koźle
