= Wrocław Brochów railway station =

Railway station in Wrocław, Poland

Wrocław Brochów
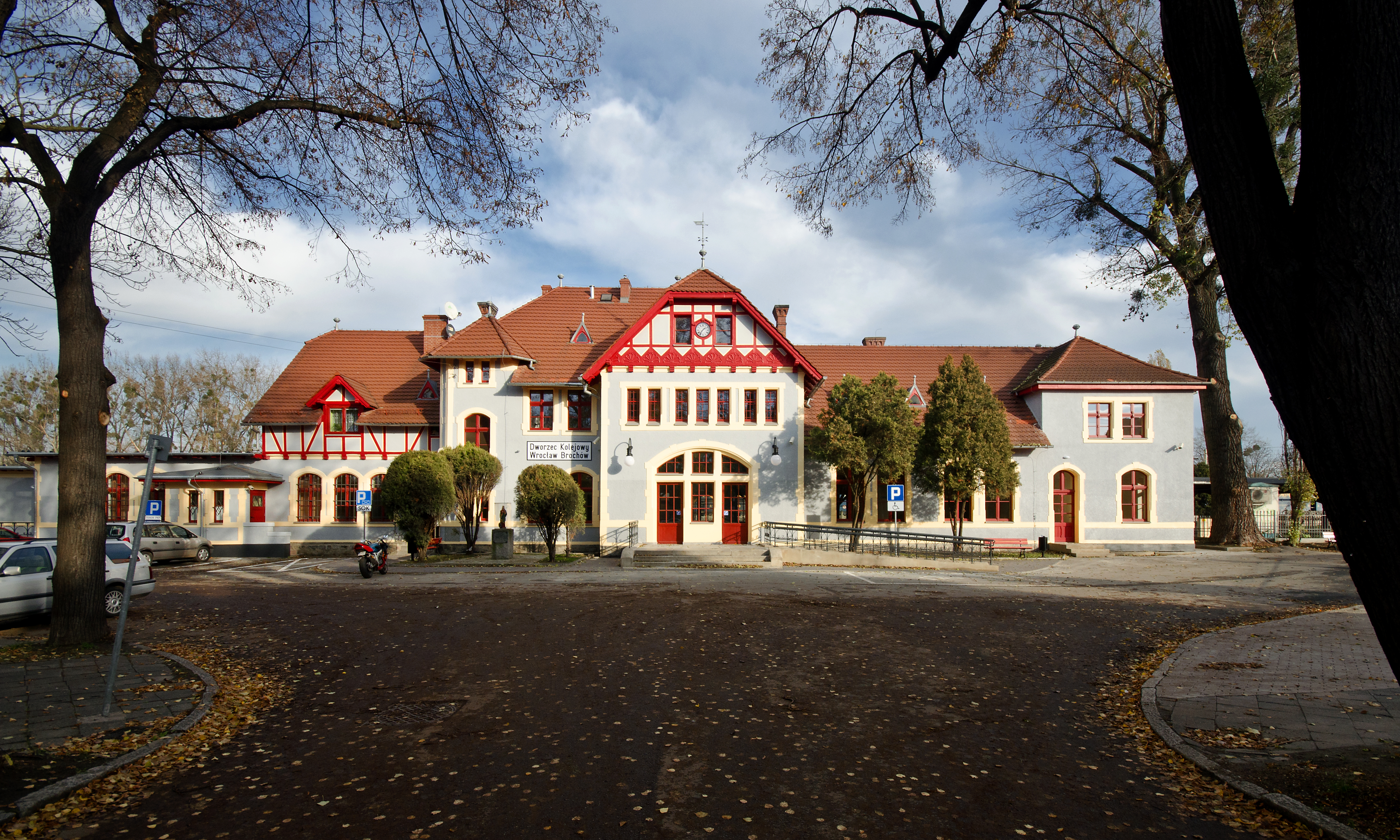

General information
- Location: Brochów, Wrocław, Lower Silesian Voivodeship; Poland
- Coordinates: 51.059722°N 17.089167°E
- Owner: Polskie Koleje Państwowe S.A.
- Platforms: 2

History
- Opened: 1896
- Former names: Brockau, Broków, Brochów

Services
Preceding station	Polregio	Following station
Wrocław Główny Terminus	PR	Święta Katarzyna towards Brzeg, Nysa, Opole Główne, Kędzierzyn-Koźle, Racibórz or Gliwice
Wrocław Główny Terminus	PR	Siechenice towards Jelcz-Laskowice
Preceding station	KD	Following station
Siechenice towards Jelcz-Laskowice	D7	Wrocław Główny towards Krotoszyn
Location
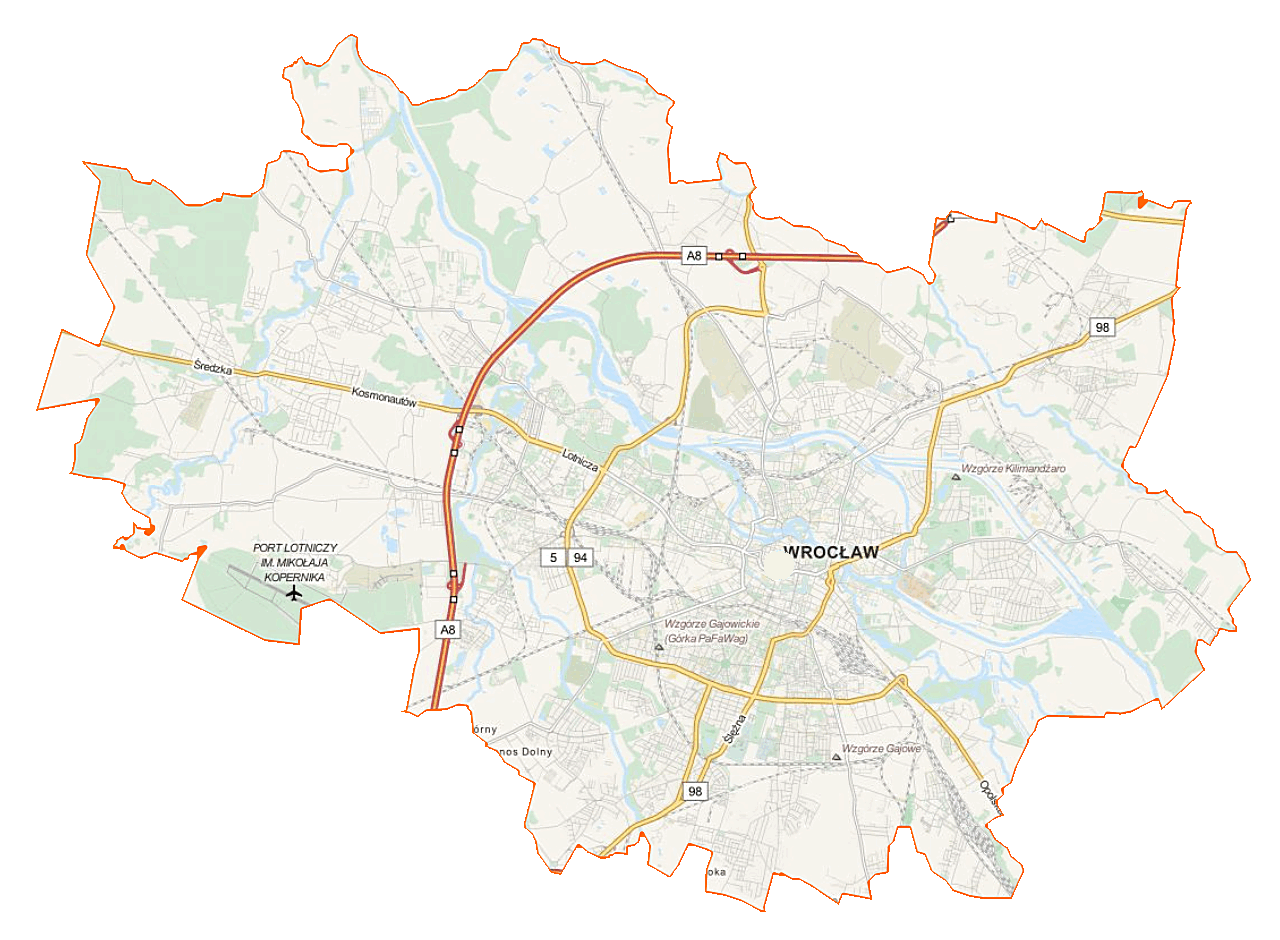
- Location within Wrocław

Wrocław Brochów is a railway station in the Brochów district of Wrocław, Poland. The railway station was built in 1896 due to the growing importance of Brochów's railway yard, being one of the largest in the German Empire, found on the Wrocław – Oława line completed in 1842, the first phase of the Upper Silesian Railway.

Nowadays, only regional trains, operated by Polregio and Lower Silesian Railways on lines Wrocław Główny – Opole and Wrocław Wojnów – Jelcz Laskowice stop at the station. Nearby the passenger station is one of the largest railway cargo hubs in Poland – Wrocław Brochów Towarowy.

In December 2011, the station building's restoration began. The total cost of which was about 1,8 million Polish złotys (including adaptation for disabled people).

== Connections ==
- 132 Bytom - Wrocław Główny
- 277 Opole Groszowice - Wrocław Brochów
- 349 Święta Katarzyna - Wrocław Kuźniki
- 764 Siechnice - Wrocław Brochów

== Train Services ==
The station is served by the following service(s):

- Regional services (PR) Wrocław Główny - Oława - Brzeg
- Regional services (PR) Wrocław Główny - Oława - Brzeg - Nysa
- Regional service (PR) Wrocław - Oława - Brzeg - Nysa - Kędzierzyn-Koźle
- Regional services (PR) Wrocław Główny - Oława - Brzeg - Opole Główne
- Regional service (PR) Wrocław - Oława - Brzeg - Opole Główne - Kędzierzyn-Koźle
- Regional service (PR) Wrocław - Oława - Brzeg - Opole Główne - Kędzierzyn-Koźle - Racibórz
- Regional service (PR) Wrocław - Oława - Brzeg - Opole Główne - Gliwice
- Regional services (PR) Wrocław Główny - Jelcz-Laskowice
