= Oława railway station =

Railway station in Oława, Poland

Oława
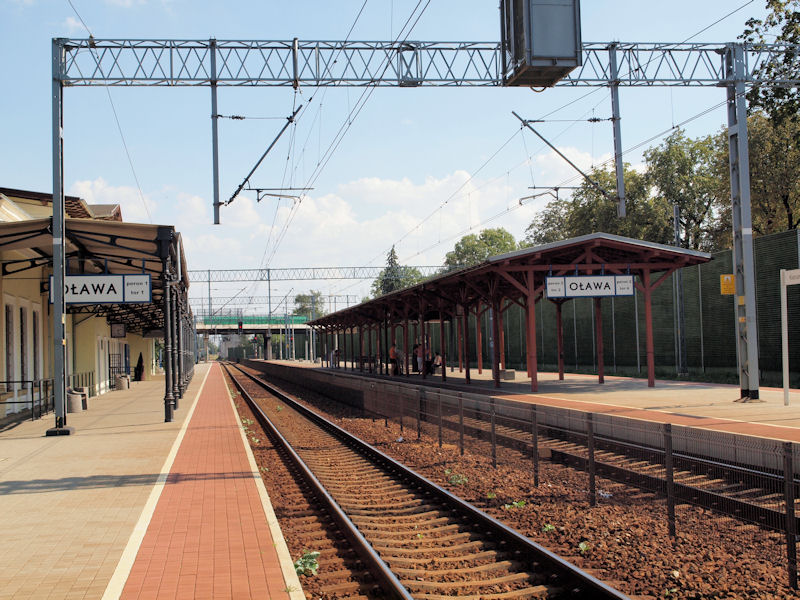

General information
- Location: Oława, Lower Silesian Voivodeship; Poland
- Coordinates: 50.5552°N 17.1749°E
- Owner: Polskie Koleje Państwowe S.A.
- Platforms: 2

History
- Opened: 1842
- Former names: Ohlau

Services
Preceding station	PKP Intercity	Following station
Wrocław Główny towards Ustka	IC	Brzeg towards Bielsko-Biała Główna
Wrocław Główny towards Bydgoszcz Główna	IC	Brzeg towards Zakopane
Preceding station	Polregio	Following station
Lizawice towards Wrocław Główny	PR	Lipki towards Brzeg, Nysa, Opole Główne, Kędzierzyn-Koźle, Racibórz or Gliwice
Location
- Location within Poland Location within Lower Silesian Voivodeship

Oława railway station is a station in Oława, Lower Silesian Voivodeship, Poland.

In 2009, the Oława railway station's renovation was completed, preserving the station's historic attributes originating from 1842. The modernisation included that of the 10 km of rail and electric lines in the station's proximity. The reconstruction also included the reconstruction of the bridge crossing the River Oder and road viaducts.

Oława remains the oldest railway station in use in Poland, having been built in 1842, together with the Wrocław–Oława railway line.

== Train services ==
The station is served by the following service(s):

- Intercity services (IC) Ustka - Koszalin - Poznań - Wrocław - Opole - Bielsko-Biała
- Intercity services (IC) Bydgoszcz - Poznań - Leszno - Wrocław - Opole - Rybnik - Bielsko-Biała - Zakopane
- Regional services (PR) Wrocław Główny - Oława - Brzeg
- Regional services (PR) Wrocław Główny - Oława - Brzeg - Nysa
- Regional service (PR) Wrocław - Oława - Brzeg - Nysa - Kędzierzyn-Koźle
- Regional services (PR) Wrocław Główny - Oława - Brzeg - Opole Główne
- Regional service (PR) Wrocław - Oława - Brzeg - Opole Główne - Kędzierzyn-Koźle
- Regional service (PR) Wrocław - Oława - Brzeg - Opole Główne - Kędzierzyn-Koźle - Racibórz
- Regional service (PR) Wrocław - Oława - Brzeg - Opole Główne - Gliwice
