= Łosiów =

- Village
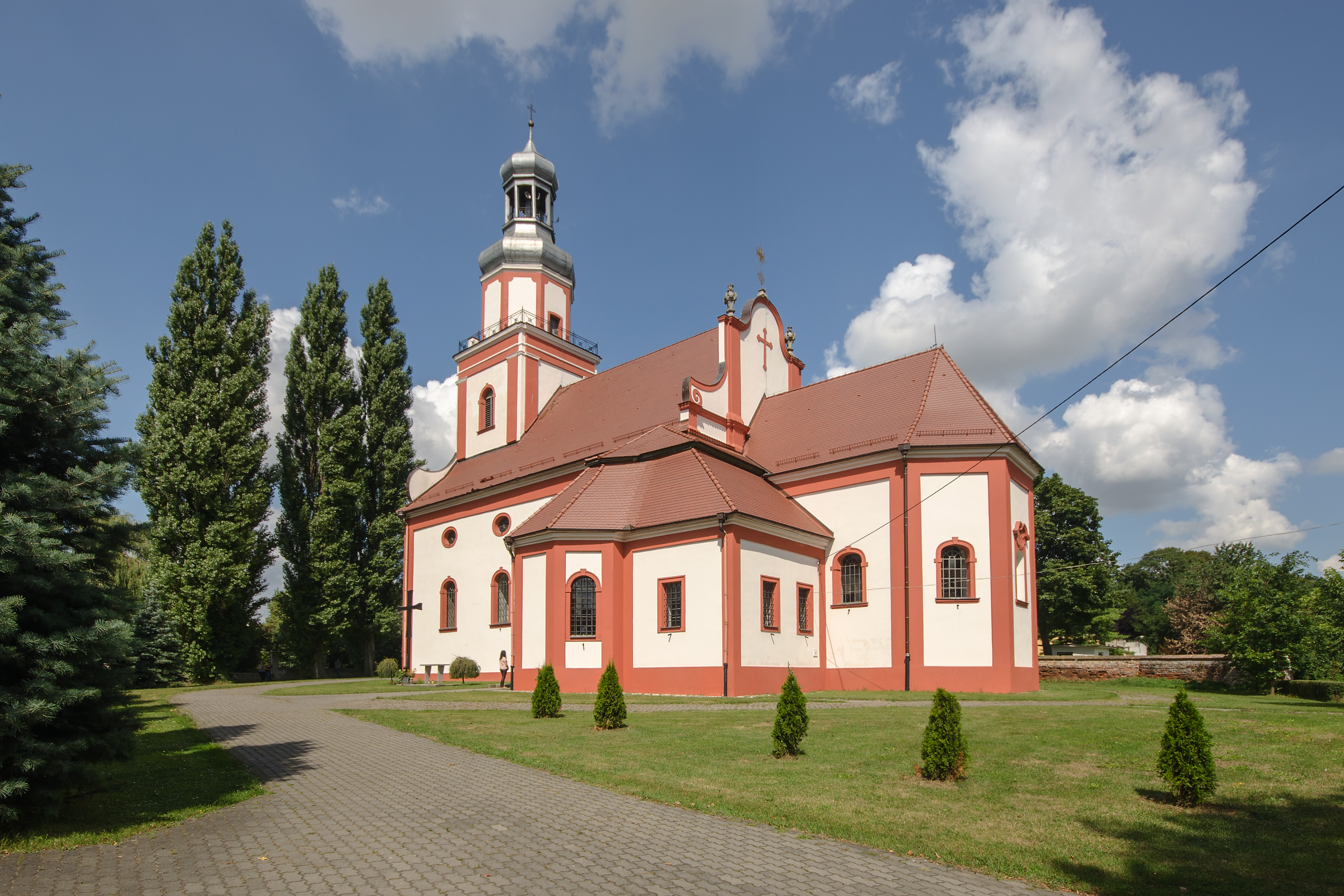
- Church of John the Baptist

- Location within Poland
- Coordinates: 50°47′N 17°34′E
- Country: Poland
- Voivodeship: Opole
- County: Brzeg
- Gmina: Lewin Brzeski

Population
  - Total: 1,510
- Time zone: UTC+1 (CET)
  - Summer (DST): UTC+2 (CEST)
- Vehicle registration: OB

Łosiów [ˈwɔɕuf] is a village in the administrative district of Gmina Lewin Brzeski, within Brzeg County, Opole Voivodeship, in south-western Poland.

== Etymology ==
The name is of Polish origin, and refers to it location on a heath.

== History ==
The first reference of the village originates from Bishop of Wrocław Żyrosław I's documents from 1189, when it was part of medieval Piast-ruled Poland. Between 1207 and 1210 the village was the seat of the commandry for the Sovereign Military Order of Malta. It remained ruled by the Piast dynasty until 1675. Later on, it was incorporated into the Bohemian Crown. In the 18th century, it was annexed by Kingdom of Prussia, and from 1871 to 1945 it was also part of Germany. In 1945 the village became again part of Poland.

== Demography ==
Historical population
Year	Pop.	±%
1998	1,589	—
2002	1,560	−1.8%
2009	1,535	−1.6%
2011	1,510	−1.6%

== Sights ==
- John the Baptist's parish church, built in 1255 and property of the Sovereign Military Order of Malta. The present Baroque church was built in 1703, and between 1728 and 1731 - with restored Gothic walls.
- Park
- Former evangelical church, deconstructed after 1945. At the present day a shop is located at its former location.

== Transport ==
There is a railway station in the village, located on the Bytom–Wrocław railway.

== Gallery ==
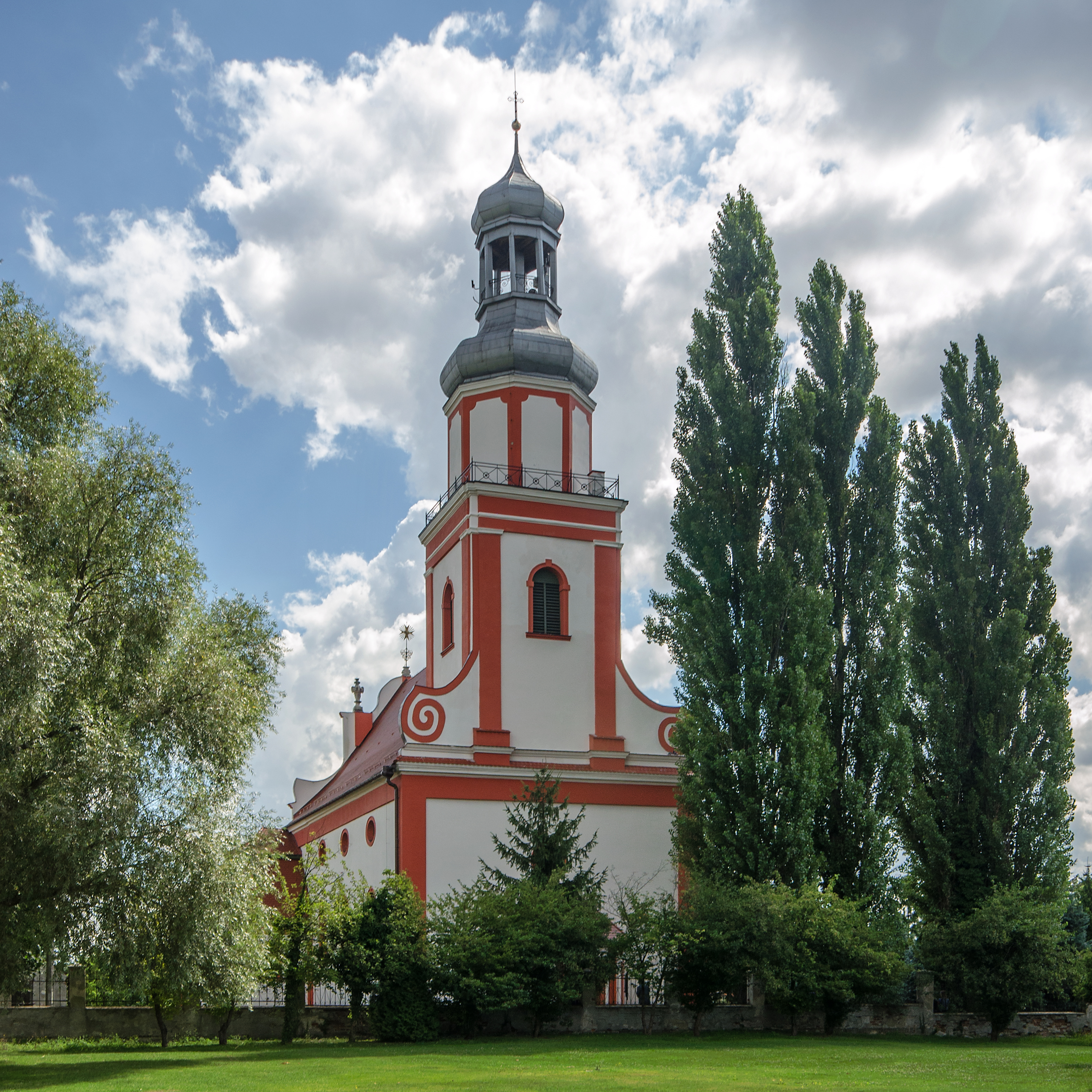
John the Baptist's Church

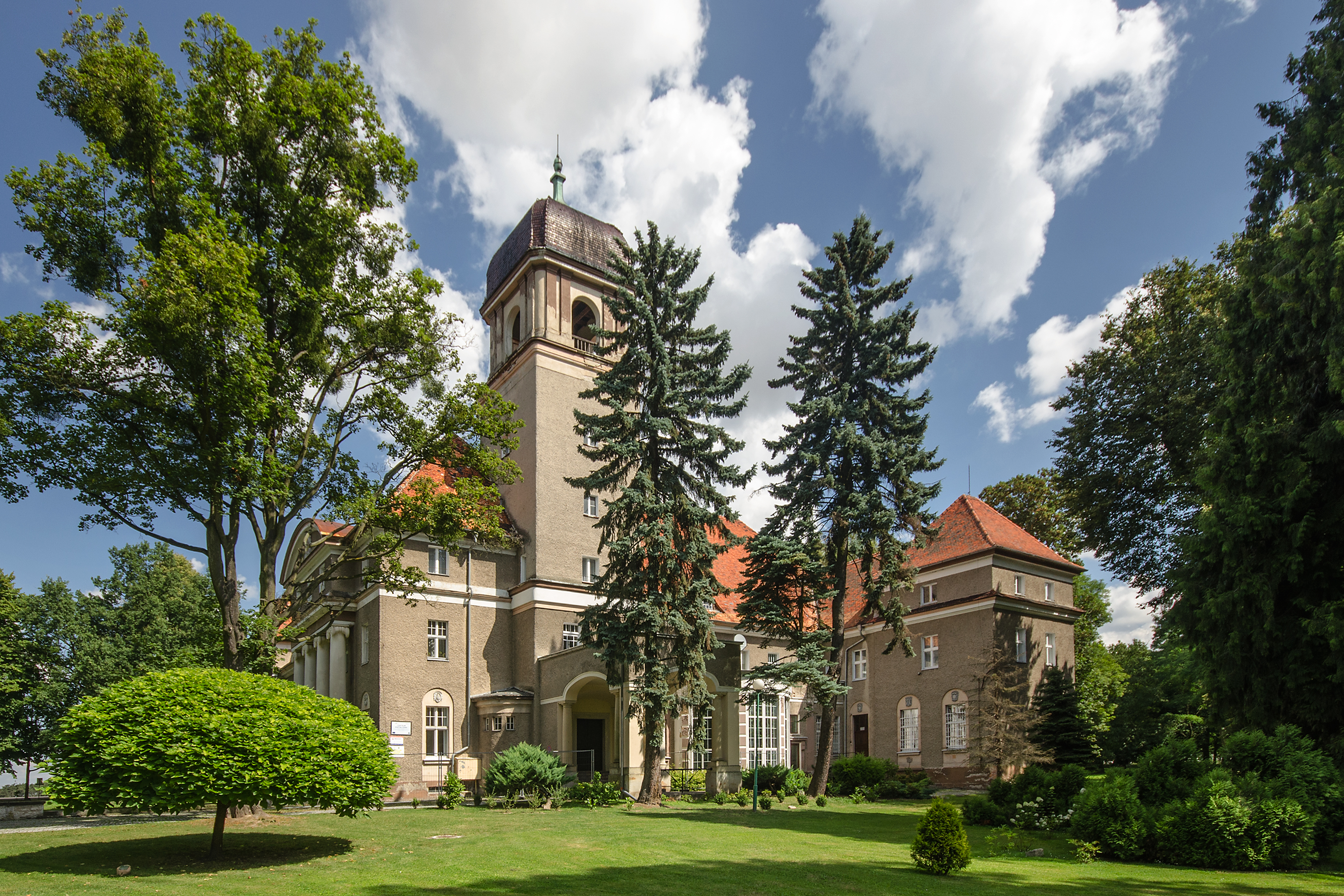
Palace

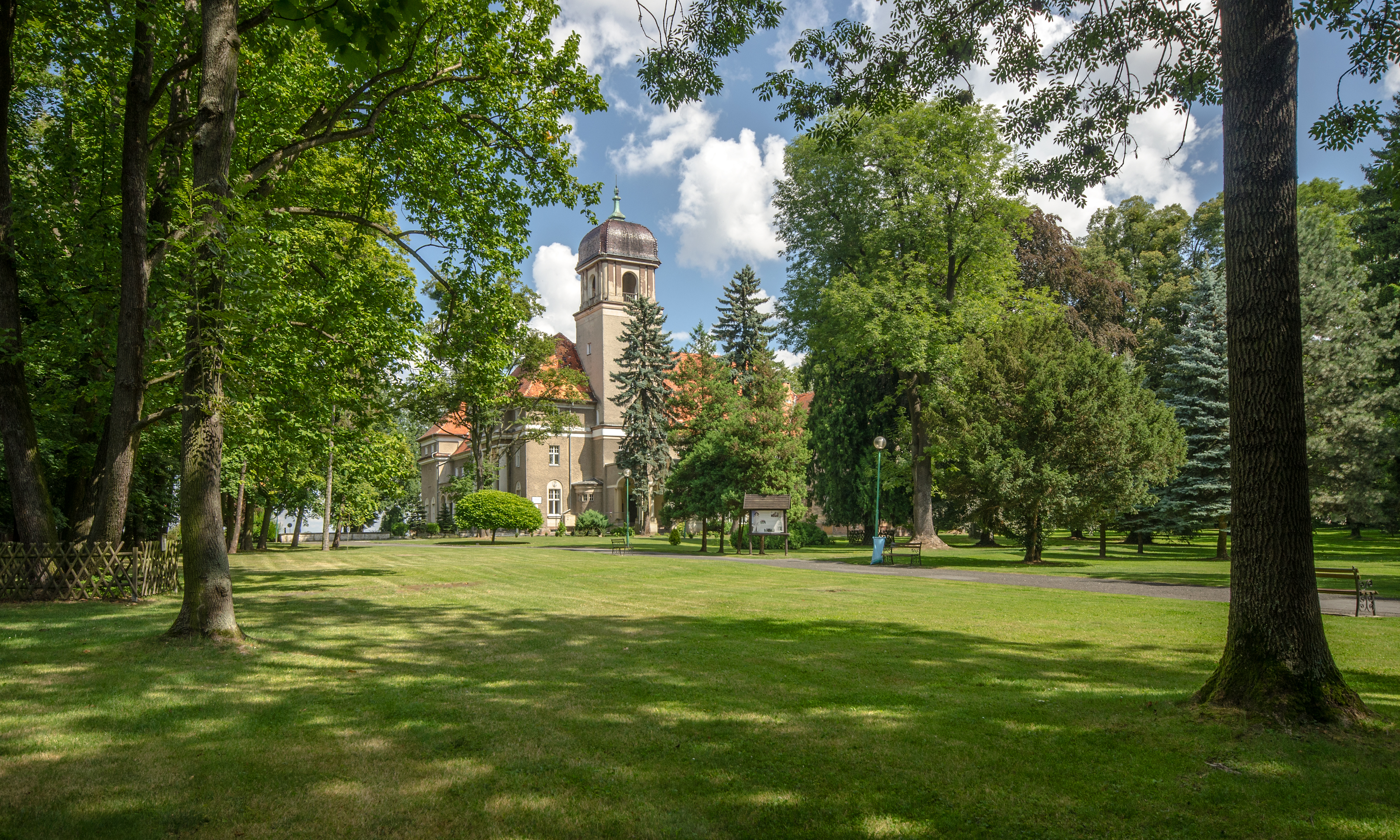
Palace Park
