= Olszanka railway station =

Railway station in Olszanka, Poland

Olszanka
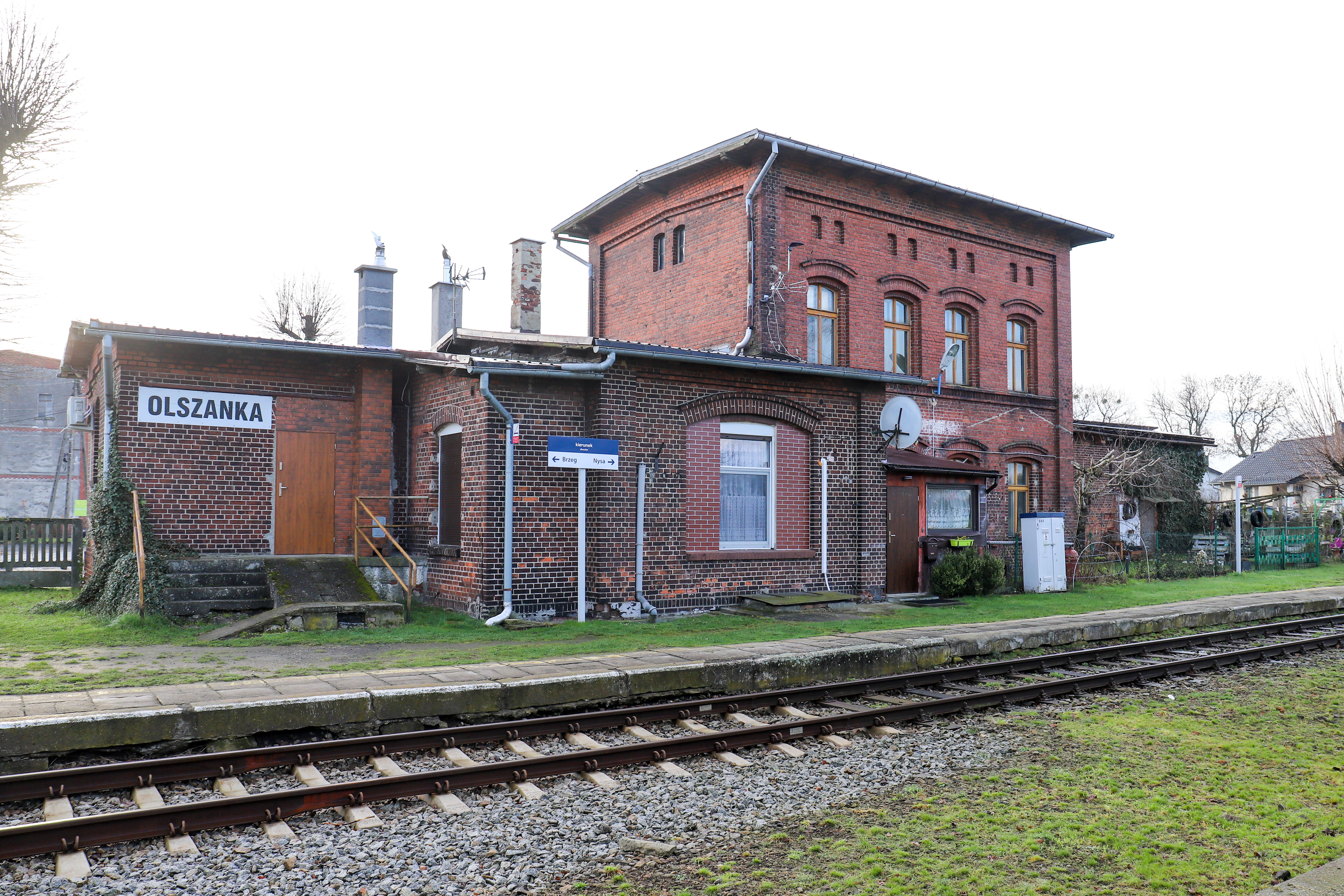
- Station in March 2024

General information
- Location: Olszanka, Opole Voivodeship; Poland
- Coordinates: 50.4742°N 17.2839°E
- Owner: Polskie Koleje Państwowe S.A.
- Line: Nysa–Brzeg
- Platforms: 2

History
- Opened: 1847
- Former names: Alzenau, Łacnowice

Services
Preceding station	Polregio	Following station
Brzeg towards Brzeg or Wrocław Główny	PR	Czeska Wieś towards Nysa or Kędzierzyn-Koźle
Location
- Location within Poland Location within Opole Voivodeship

Olszanka is a railway station in Olszanka, Opole Voivodeship, Poland.

== Train services ==
The station is served by the following service(s):

- Regional services (PR) Wrocław Główny - Oława - Brzeg - Nysa
- Regional service (PR) Wrocław - Oława - Brzeg - Nysa - Kędzierzyn-Koźle
- Regional service (PR) Brzeg - Nysa
- Regional service (PR) Brzeg - Nysa - Kędzierzyn-Koźle
