= Brochów =

District in Wrocław, Poland

- District of Wrocław
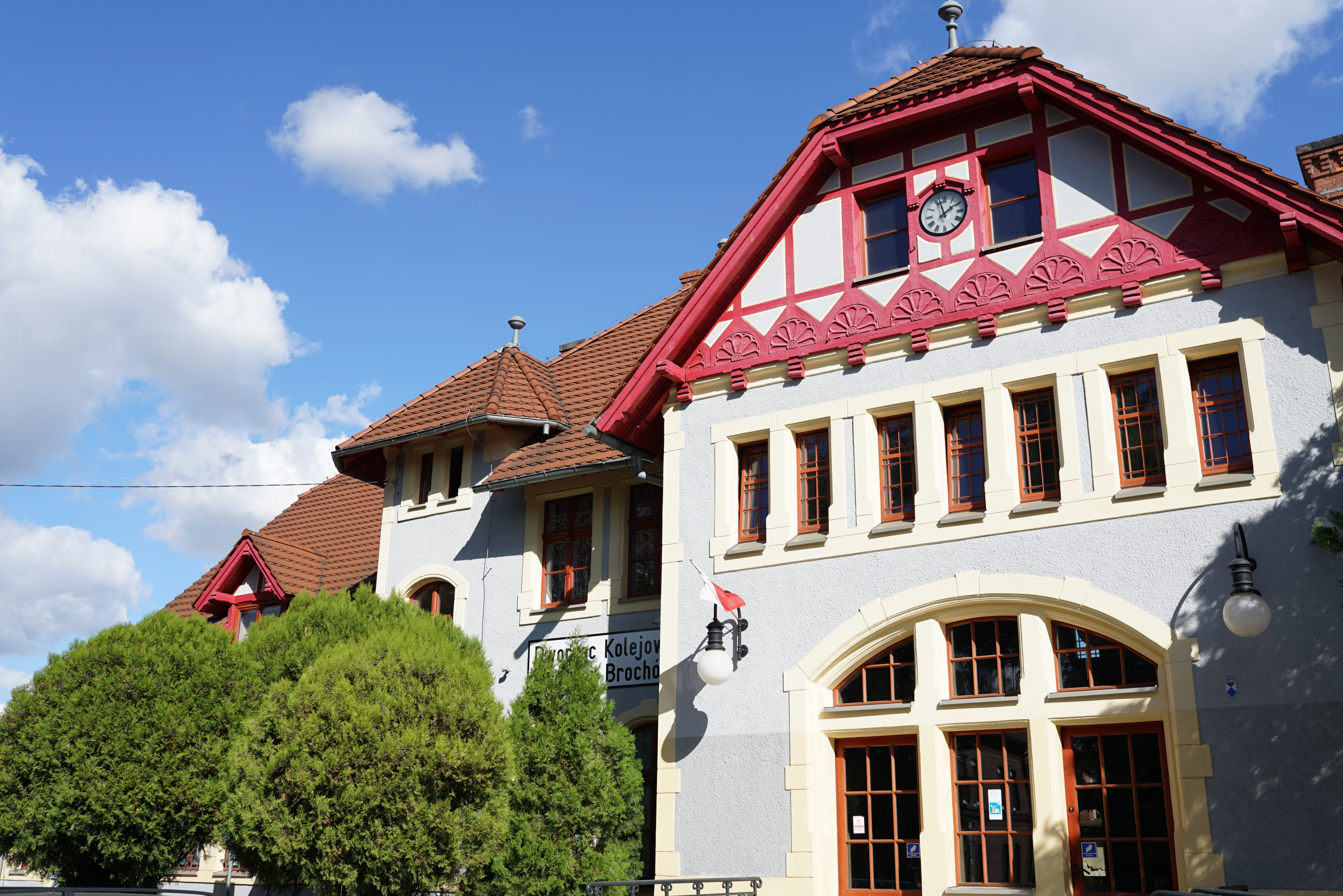
- Wrocław Brochów railway station

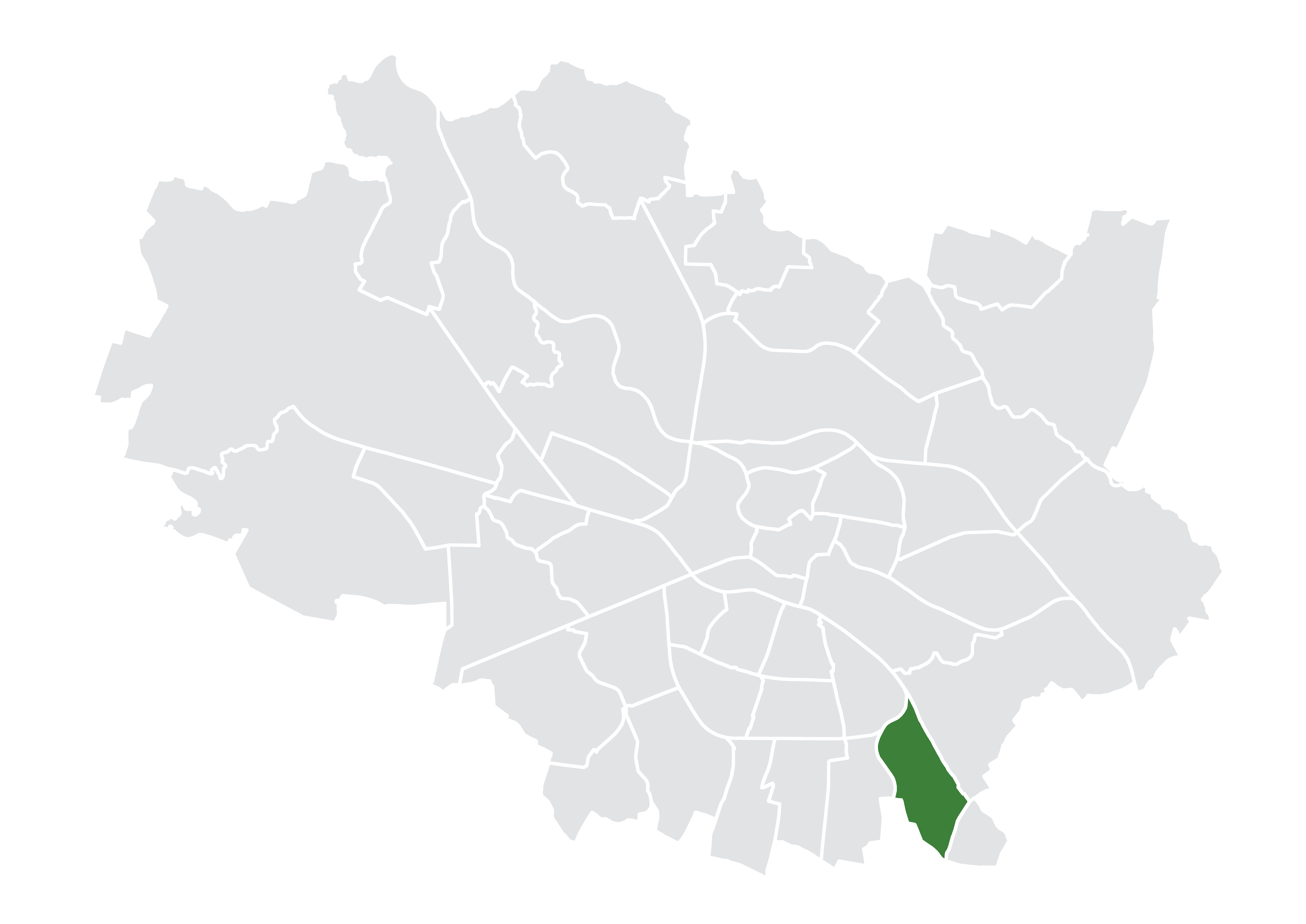
- Location of Brochów within Wrocław
- Country: Poland
- Voivodeship: Lower Silesian
- County/City: Wrocław
- First mentioned: 1193
- Incorporated into the city: 1951
- Established the modern-day district: 1991

Population (2022)
  - Total: 7,954
- Time zone: UTC+1 (CET)
  - Summer (DST): UTC+2 (CEST)
- Area code: +48 71
- Website: Osiedle Brochów

Brochów (Polish pronunciation: [ˈbrɔxuf], German: Brockau, [ˈbʁɔkaʊ]) is a district in Wrocław, Poland, located in the south-eastern part of the city. It was established in the territory of the former Krzyki district.

Initially a separate town, the settlement was incorporated into Wrocław on January 1, 1951.

== Name ==
The name is thought to derive from the Polish word 'brochowisko', which means 'a boggy place where wild boars or deers swim in the mud'. During the Middle Ages, the village's name was likely Prochovo, Brochowo or Brochów.

The name was later Germanized by Germans living in the settlement to Bracke, followed by Brockau.

In 1945, after the war, the town was taken over by the Polish administration, initially using the name Broków or Prochów. The name was later changed to Brochów in May 1946.

== History ==
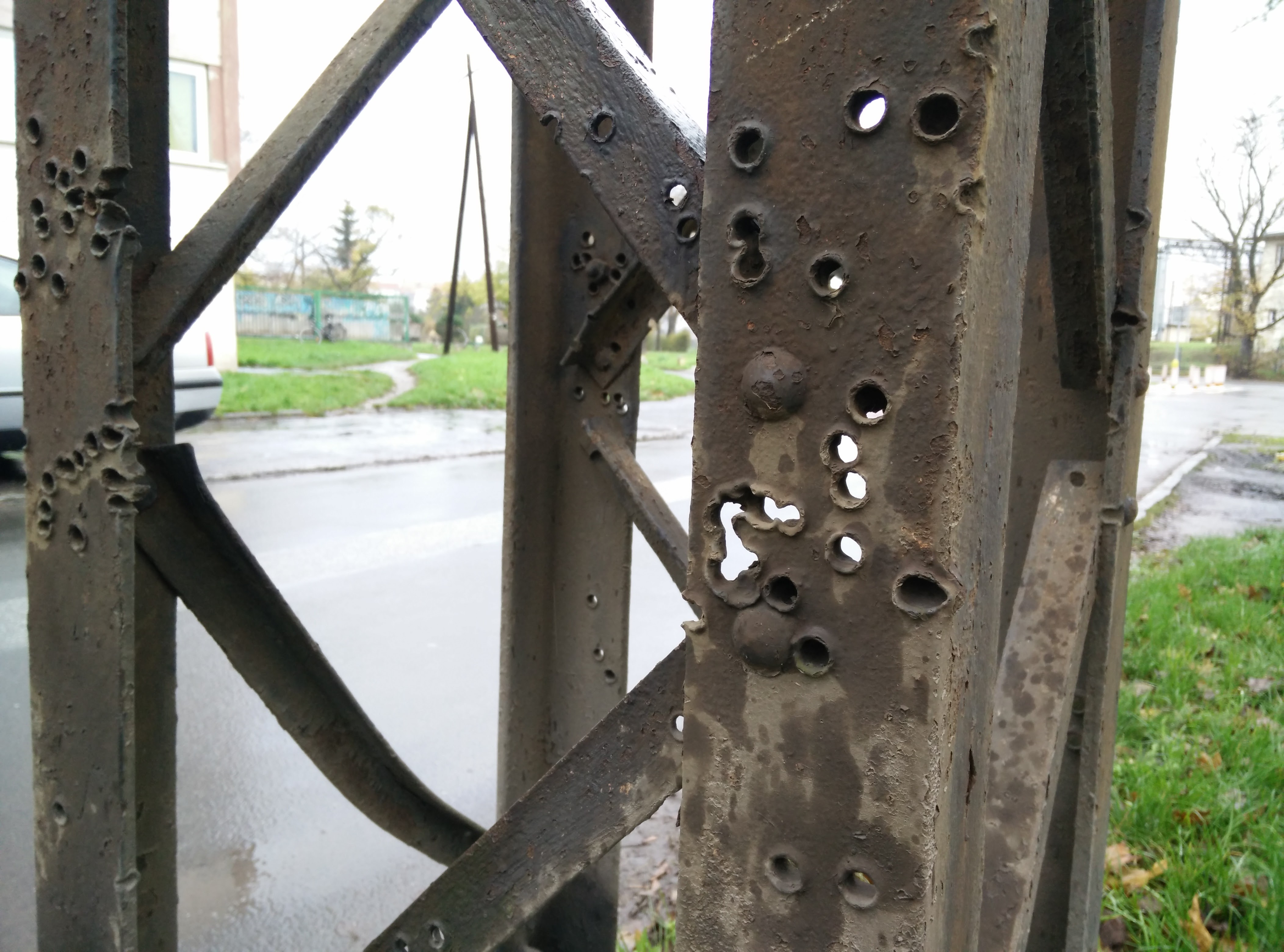
Bullet holes from World War II

The earliest record of the settlement of Brochów dates back to 1193. The village was owned by the Augustinians for over 600 years, until 1810. They also established the Brochów Park, the oldest park in present-day Wrocław.

At the beginning of the 20th century Brockau was already an urban settlement, having had a city hall since 1908. On June 1, 1939, Brockau was granted city rights.

The capture of Brockau by Soviet troops during World War II took place on February 19, 1945. The town was incorporated into Wrocław on January 1, 1951.

In 1991, after reforms in the administrative division of Wrocław, Brochów became one of the city's 48 districts.
