= Pan-European Corridor III =

Belgium-Ukraine rail and road investment priority area

Pan-European Corridor IIІ
- Pan-European Corridor IIІ highlighted in red

Major junctions
- Start end: Dresden (Germany)
- End end: Kyiv (Ukraine)

Location
- Countries: Germany, Poland and Ukraine

Highway system
- Pan-European corridors

The Corridor IIІ is one of the Pan-European corridors. The corridor follows the route: Dresden - Wrocław - Katowice - Kraków - Lviv - Kyiv

== Branches ==
- Pan-European Corridor IIIa - Berlin - Wrocław

== The Road corridor ==
Approximately 1650 km, commencing from Dresden, Germany, as a continuation of European Route E40 Calais - Brussels - Aachen - Cologne, and continues as E40 through southern Poland to Kyiv, Ukraine, where E40 continues through Russia, Kazakhstan, Uzbekistan, Turkmenistan, and Kyrgyzstan to Ridder in Kazakhstan .

=== Germany ===
The Southern Branch from Dresden 97 km as A4 (E40) as four-lane Autobahn with hard shoulder and the tunnel “Königshainer Berge” east to Poland at Ludwigsdorf.

=== Poland ===
National Road DK 4 (1996) as A4 motorway (E40) from Jędrzychowice just north of Görlitz via Zgorzelec - Legnica – Wroclaw – Opole – Gliwice – Katowice – Krakow -Tarnow - Rzeszow to Ukraine at Medyka.

=== Ukraine ===
East from Poland at Sheghini for 612 km as M10 to Lviv and M06 via Rivne and Zhytomyr to Kyiv. 308 km were category Ib roads with four lanes, with another 304 km category II with two lanes.

== The Rail corridor ==
Approximately 1750 km

=== Germany ===
KBS 230 double-track, non-electrified from Dresden 102 km east to Poland at Görlitz.

=== Poland ===
677 km as E30 Zgorzelec – Węgliniec – Bolesławiec – Legnica – Wrocław – Opole – Kędzierzyn-Koźle – Gliwice – Zabrze – Katowice – Kraków – Tarnów – Rzeszów – Przemyśl to Ukraine.

Comprises:

PLK 278 from Zgorzelec 27 km to Węgliniec.

PLK 274 from the German border at Zgorzelec 293 km double track electrified to Wroclaw.

PLK 132 double track electrified from Wroclaw to Opole.

PLK 136 from Opole 38 km double-track, electrified to Kędzierzyn-Koźle.

PLK 133 from Katowice 71 km double track electrified to Kraków.

PLK 134 from Mysłowice 12 km electrified, almost entirely double track to Jaworzno Szczakowa.

PLK 137 the Podsudecka main line from Legnica to Katowice electrified and double-tracked from Kędzierzyn-Koźle 70 km to Katowice.

PLK 275 from Germany at Gubin 193 km to Wroclaw.

PLK 282 from Miłkowice to Żary.

PLK 91 from Krakow 259 km electrified, mostly double track to the Ukrainian border at Medyka.

=== Ukraine ===
From Poland at Mostiska (with change to broad gauge) double track electrified via Lviv – Ternopol – Grecany – Vinnitsa to Kyiv.
