= Lipki, Opole Voivodeship =

Lipki
- Village
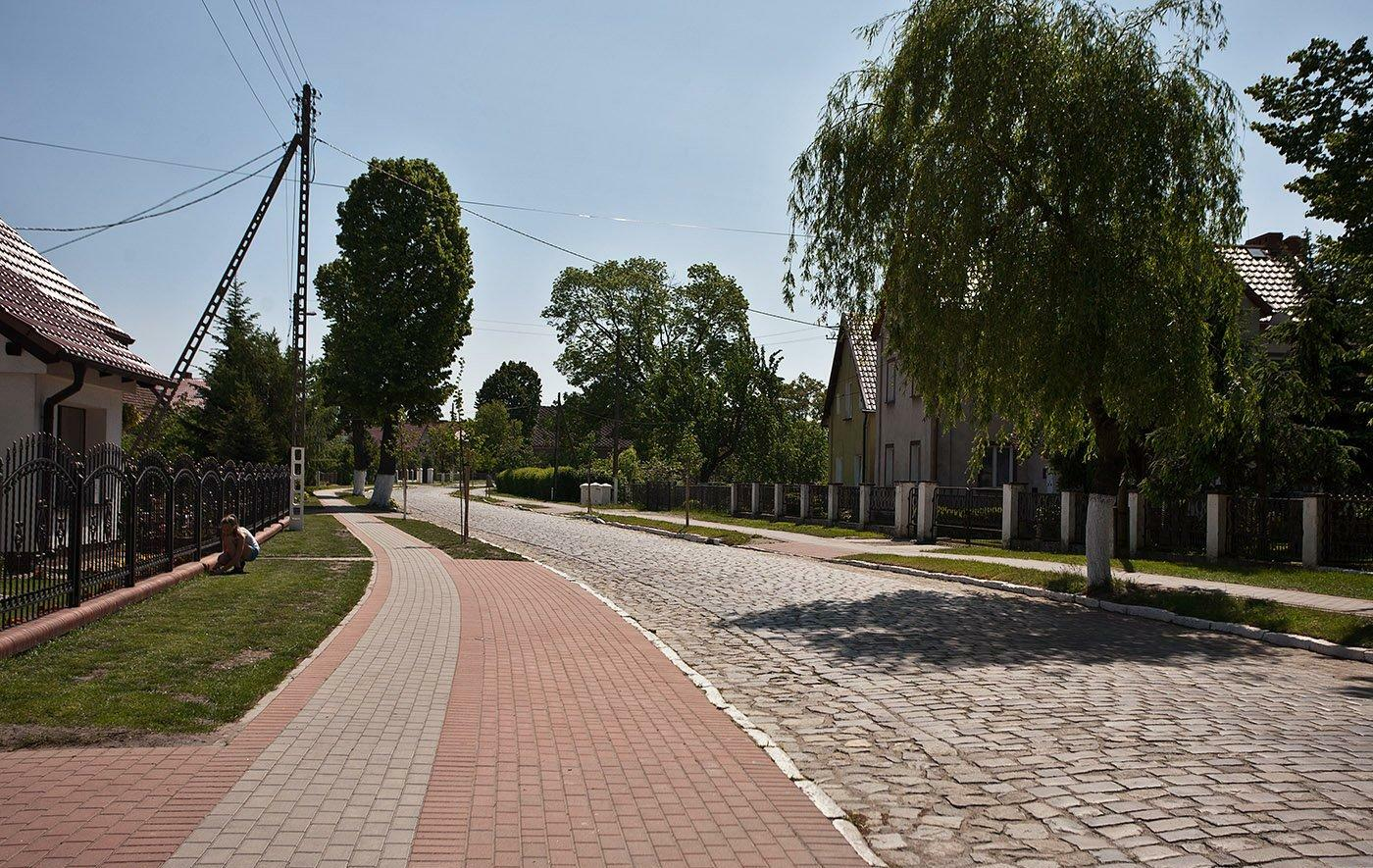

- Location within Poland
- Coordinates: 50°54′38″N 17°23′35″E
- Country: Poland
- Voivodeship: Opole
- County: Brzeg
- Gmina: Skarbimierz

Lipki [ˈlipki] (German Linden) is a village in the administrative district of Gmina Skarbimierz, within Brzeg County, Opole Voivodeship, in south-western Poland.
