= Zębice =

- Village
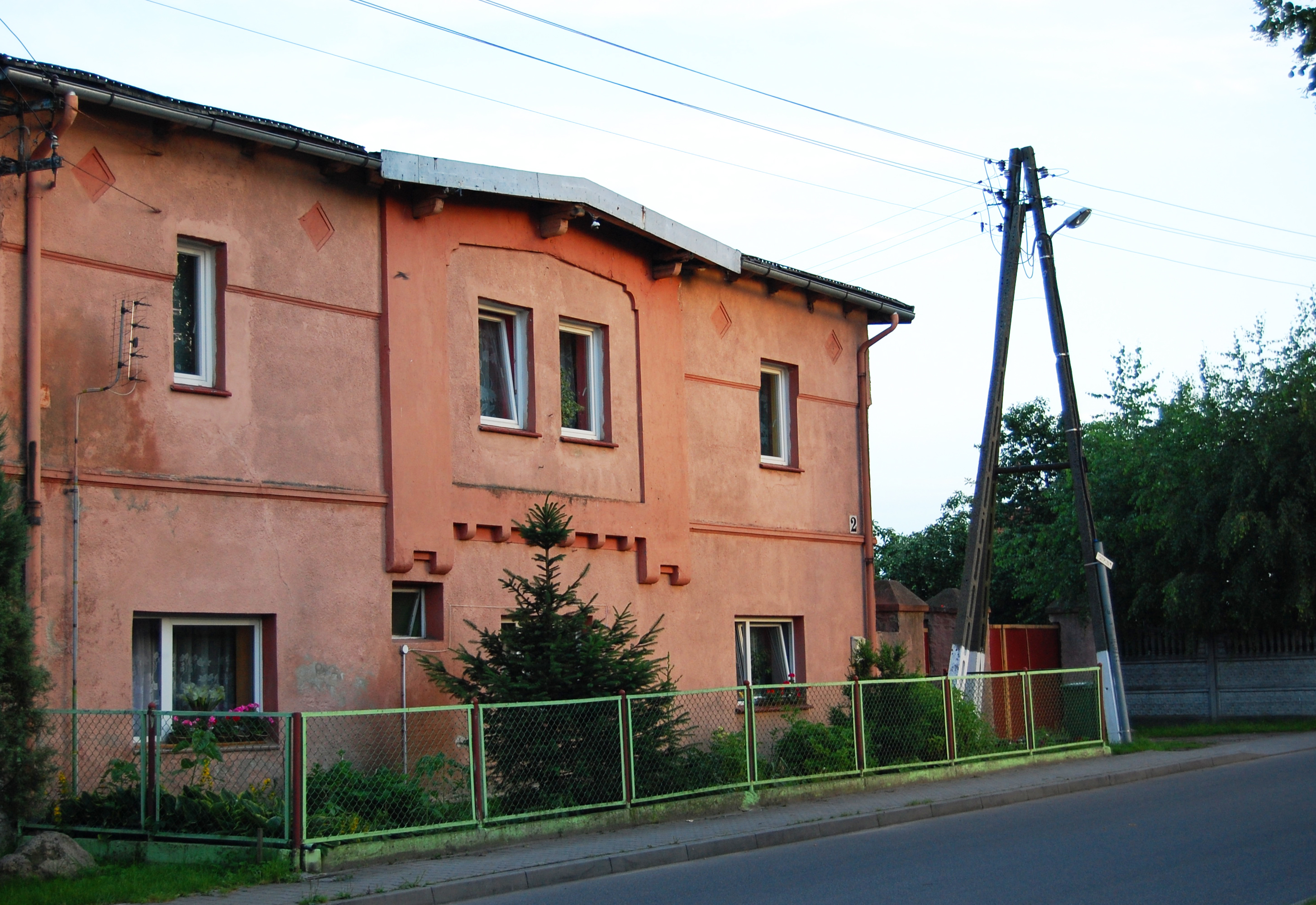

- Location within Poland
- Coordinates: 51°00′14″N 17°09′05″E
- Country: Poland
- Voivodeship: Lower Silesian
- County: Wrocław
- Gmina: Siechnice

Zębice (Polish pronunciation: [zɛmˈbit͡sɛ], German: Sambowitz, [ˈzambɔvɪt͡s]) is a village in the administrative district of Gmina Siechnice, within Wrocław County, Lower Silesian Voivodeship, in south-western Poland.
