= Lizawice =

- Village
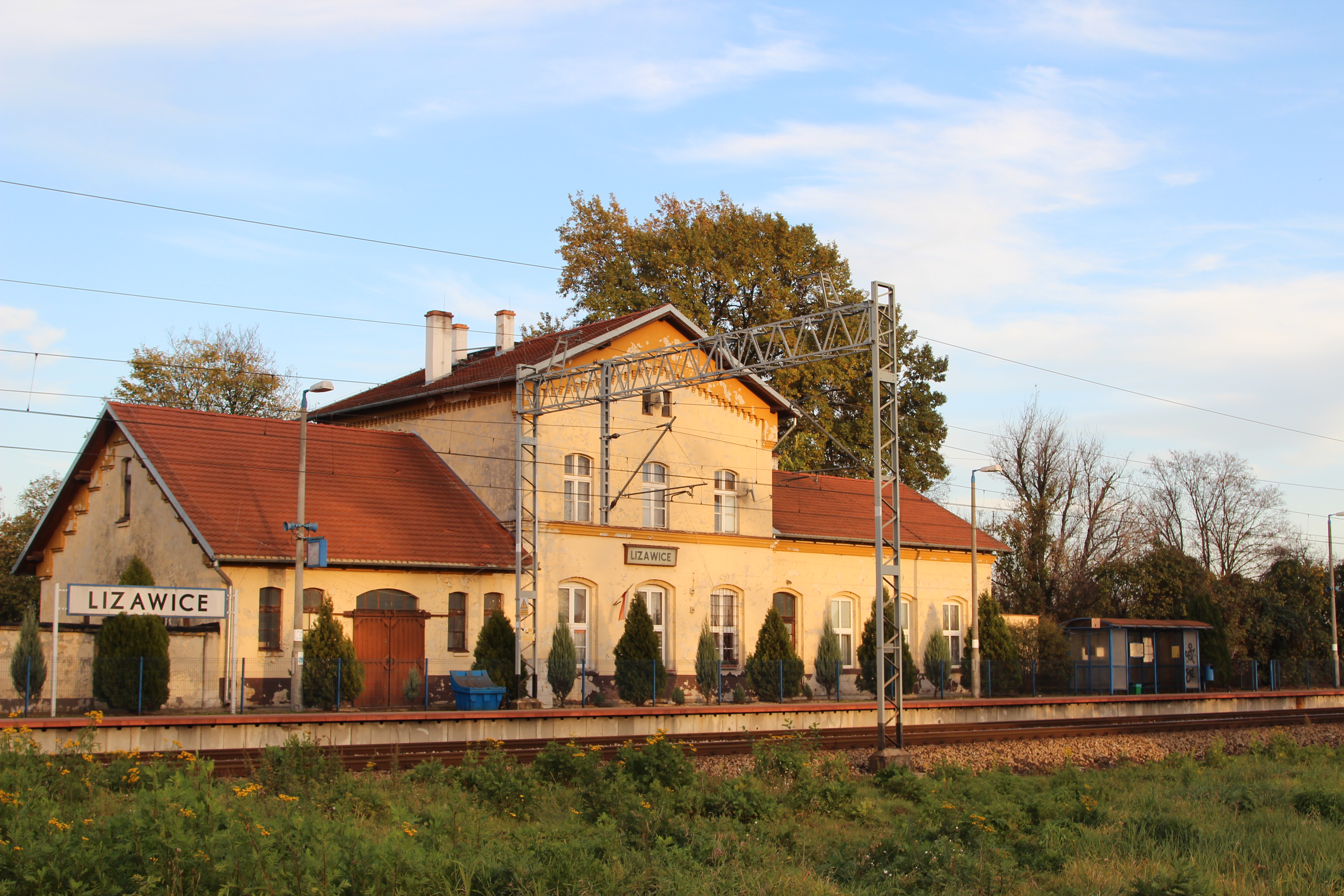
- Railway station

- Location within Poland
- Coordinates: 50°58′N 17°13′E
- Country: Poland
- Voivodeship: Lower Silesian
- County: Oława
- Gmina: Oława
- Population: 300

Lizawice [lizaˈvit͡sɛ] is a village in the administrative district of Gmina Oława, within Oława County, Lower Silesian Voivodeship, in south-western Poland.
