= Przecza =

- Village
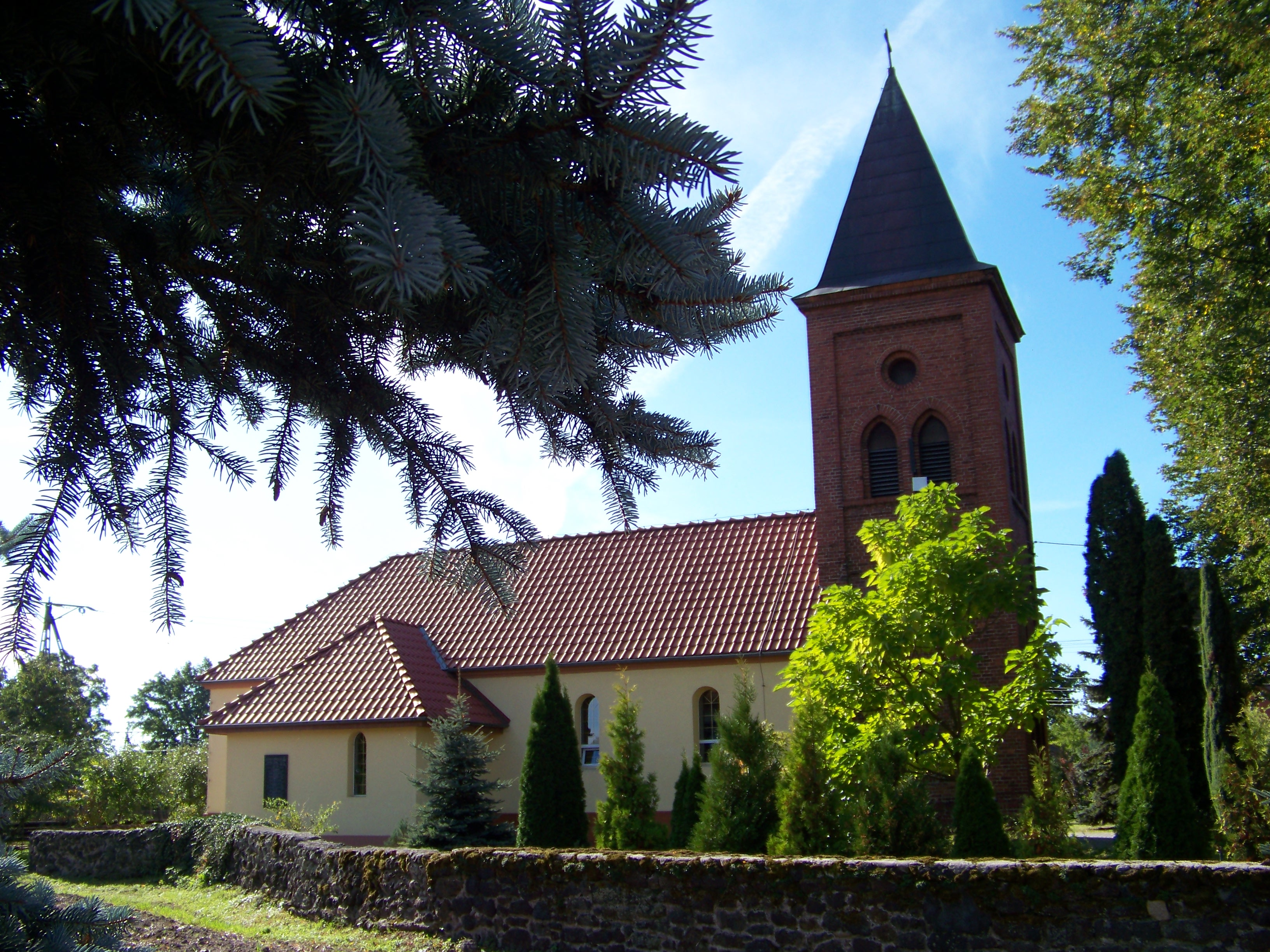
- Catholic church

- Location within Poland
- Coordinates: 50°44′N 17°40′E
- Country: Poland
- Voivodeship: Opole
- County: Brzeg
- Gmina: Lewin Brzeski

Przecza [ˈpʂɛt͡ʂa] is a village in the administrative district of Gmina Lewin Brzeski, within Brzeg County, Opole Voivodeship, in south-western Poland.
