= Brzeg railway station =

Railway station in Brzeg, Opole Voivodeship, Poland

Brzeg
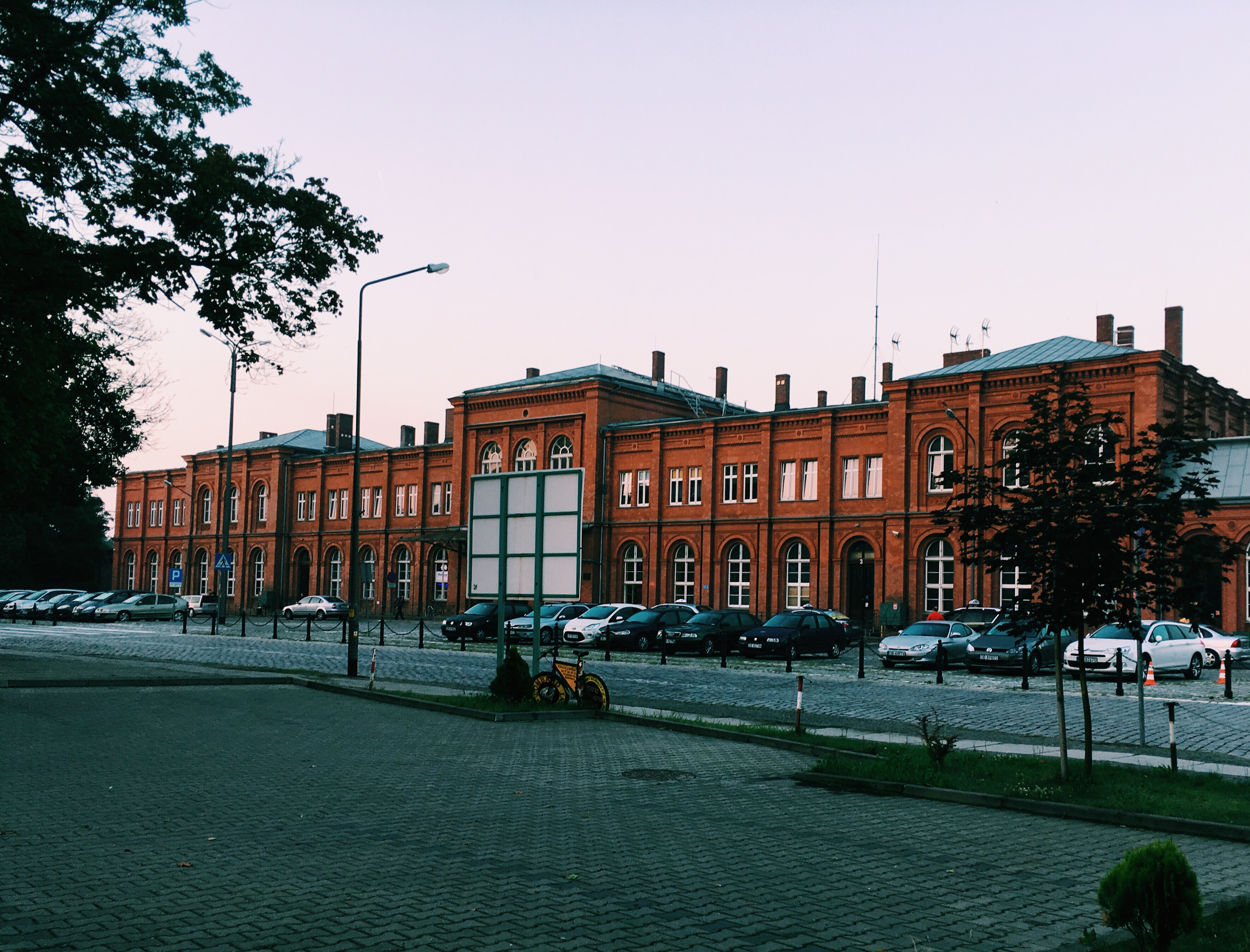

General information
- Location: Brzeg, Opole Voivodeship; Poland
- Coordinates: 50.8531°N 17.4707°E
- Owner: Polskie Koleje Państwowe S.A.
- Platforms: 2

History
- Opened: 1842
- Former names: Brieg

Services
Preceding station	PKP Intercity	Following station
Opole Główne towards Warszawa Wschodnia	EIP	Wrocław Główny Terminus
Oława towards Ustka	IC	Opole Główne towards Bielsko-Biała Główna
Oława towards Bydgoszcz Główna	IC	Opole Główne towards Zakopane
Preceding station	Polregio	Following station
Lipki towards Wrocław Główny	PR	Terminus
Lipki towards Wrocław Główny	PR	Łosiów towards Opole Główne, Kędzierzyn-Koźle, Racibórz or Gliwice
Terminus	PR	Łosiów towards Opole Główne or Kędzierzyn-Koźle
Lipki towards Wrocław Główny	PR	Olszanka towards Nysa or Kędzierzyn-Koźle
Terminus	PR	Olszanka towards Nysa or Kędzierzyn-Koźle
Location
- Location within Poland

Brzeg railway station is a station in Brzeg, Opole Voivodeship, Poland. The station is part of the Third Pan-European Corridor, linking Dresden - Wrocław - Kraków - Kyiv.

In the years 2009–2010, the railway infrastructure of the station and a 4 km stretch of the adjoining lines was redeveloped. The investment totaled 154 million Polish złoty. The modernisation was completed on 12 January 2012. Both the interior and the exterior of the station itself were thoroughly renovated, at a cost of 4.2 million Polish złoty. The reopening of the railway station was celebrated on 9 February 2012.

== History ==
The railway station in Brzeg, located on the main line between Wrocław and Opole, is one of the oldest stations in Poland, on the oldest railway line in Poland. The railway reached Brzeg in August 1842. The station in Brzeg was built in 1869–1870, and it is a heritage listed building.

== Connections ==
- 132 Bytom - Wrocław Główny
- 288 Nysa - Brzeg
- 304 Brzeg - Łagiewniki

== Train services ==
The station is served by the following service(s):

- Express Intercity Premium services (EIP) Warsaw - Wrocław
- Intercity services (IC) Ustka - Koszalin - Poznań - Wrocław - Opole - Bielsko-Biała
- Regional services (PR) Wrocław Główny - Oława - Brzeg
- Regional services (PR) Wrocław Główny - Oława - Brzeg - Nysa
- Regional service (PR) Wrocław - Oława - Brzeg - Nysa - Kędzierzyn-Koźle
- Regional services (PR) Wrocław Główny - Oława - Brzeg - Opole Główne
- Regional service (PR) Wrocław - Oława - Brzeg - Opole Główne - Kędzierzyn-Koźle
- Regional service (PR) Wrocław - Oława - Brzeg - Opole Główne - Kędzierzyn-Koźle - Racibórz
- Regional service (PR) Wrocław - Oława - Brzeg - Opole Główne - Gliwice
- Regional service (PR) Brzeg - Opole
- Regional service (PR) Brzeg - Opole - Kędzierzyn-Koźle
- Regional service (PR) Brzeg - Nysa
- Regional service (PR) Brzeg - Nysa - Kędzierzyn-Koźle
