= Opole Główne railway station =

Railway station in Opole, Poland

Coordinates: 50°39′44″N 17°55′36″E

Opole Główne
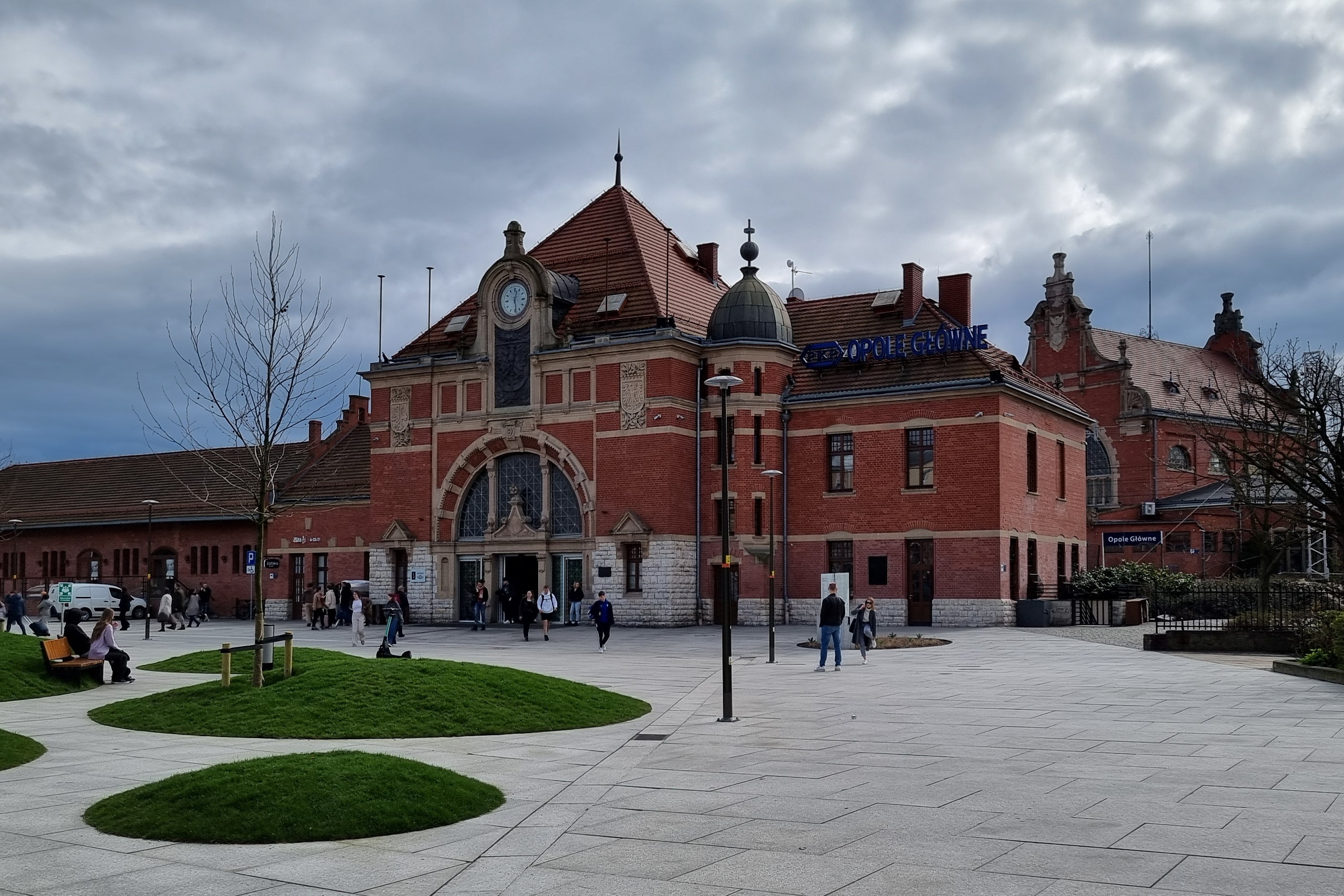

General information
- Location: city centre, Opole, Opole Voivodeship; Poland
- System: A
- Owner: Polskie Koleje Państwowe S.A.
- Platforms: 4

History
- Opened: 1899
Location
- Location within Poland Location within Opole Voivodeship

Opole Główne (Polish for Opole main station) is a major railway station in the southern Polish city of Opole. It also is the biggest station in Opole Voivodeship, with connections to all major Polish cities, several local towns of the area, as well as international locations, such as Berlin, Vienna and Hamburg.

The first station building for Opole Główne was completed in 1853, and back then it was called Oppeln Hauptbahnhof, as the city belonged to the German Empire. However, the original building was destroyed and another one was built in around 1899. It is still in use, and in 1926 underground access to platforms was constructed, together with the second building housing the entrance hall. The station building is in the eclectic style with neo-Gothic, neo-Renaissance, secession and neo-classical elements.

The station is a crucial rail junction, as it serves several connections, including the major lines to Wrocław, Częstochowa, Kędzierzyn-Koźle, and Strzelce Opolskie. Furthermore, it serves local lines to Nysa, and Kluczbork.

== Connections ==
Opole Główne is directly connected with all major Polish cities, such as:

- Białystok,
- Bielsko-Biała,
- Częstochowa,
- Gliwice,
- Gorzów Wielkopolski,
- Jelenia Góra,
- Katowice,
- Kielce,
- Koszalin,
- Kraków,
- Legnica,
- Lublin,
- Poznań,
- Przemyśl,
- Rzeszów,
- Słupsk,
- Świnoujście,
- Szczecin,
- Tarnów,
- Tarnów Mościce,
- Wałbrzych,
- Warsaw,
- Wrocław,
- Zamość.

== Train services ==
The station is served by the following service(s):

- EuroCity services (EC) (EC 95 by DB) (IC by PKP) Berlin - Frankfurt (Oder) - Rzepin - Wrocław – Katowice – Kraków – Rzeszów – Przemyśl
- Express Intercity Premium services (EIP) Warsaw - Wrocław
- Express Intercity services (EIC) Warsaw - Wrocław
- Intercity services (IC) Warsaw - Częstochowa - Opole - Wrocław
- Intercity services (IC) Zielona Góra - Wrocław - Opele - Częstochowa - Kraków - Rzeszów - Przemyśl
- Intercity services (IC) Kraków Główny — Świnoujście
- Intercity services (IC) Ustka - Koszalin - Poznań - Wrocław - Opole - Bielsko-Biała
- Intercity services (IC) Bydgoszcz - Poznań - Leszno - Wrocław - Opole - Rybnik - Bielsko-Biała - Zakopane
- Intercity services (TLK) Warsaw - Częstochowa - Lubliniec - Opole - Wrocław - Szklarska Poręba Górna
- Regional services (PR) Opole Główne - Gliwice
- Regional services (PR) Wrocław - Oława - Brzeg - Opole Główne - Gliwice
- Regional services (PR) Wrocław Główny - Oława - Brzeg - Opole Główne
- Regional services (PR) Wrocław - Oława - Brzeg - Opole Główne - Kędzierzyn-Koźle
- Regional services (PR) Wrocław - Oława - Brzeg - Opole Główne - Kędzierzyn-Koźle - Racibórz
- Regional services (PR) Brzeg - Opole
- Regional services (PR) Brzeg - Opole - Kędzierzyn-Koźle
- Regional services (PR) Kluczbork - Opole
- Regional services (PR) Opole - Nysa
- Regional services (PR) Kluczbork - Opole - Nysa

Preceding station	PKP Intercity	Following station
Wrocław Główny towards Berlin Hbf	EuroCity EC 95; IC	Gliwice towards Przemyśl Główny
Lubliniec towards Warszawa Wschodnia	EIP	Brzeg towards Wrocław Główny
Lubliniec towards Warszawa Wschodnia	EIC	Wrocław Główny Terminus
Lubliniec towards Warszawa Gdańska or Warszawa Wschodnia	IC Via Częstochowa	Brzeg towards Wrocław Główny
Brzeg towards Zielona Góra Główna	IC	Lubliniec towards Przemyśl Główny
Brzeg towards Świnoujście	IC	Gogolin towards Kraków Główny
Brzeg towards Ustka	IC	Gogolin towards Bielsko-Biała Główna
Brzeg towards Bydgoszcz Główna	IC	Gogolin towards Zakopane
Brzeg towards Szklarska Poręba Górna	TLK via Lubliniec	Lubliniec towards Warszawa Wschodnia
Preceding station	Polregio	Following station
Terminus	PR	Opole Groszowice towards Gliwice
Opole Zachodnie towards Wrocław Główny	PR	Opole Groszowice towards Gliwice
Opole Zachodnie towards Wrocław Główny	PR	Terminus
Opole Zachodnie towards Wrocław Główny	PR	Opole Groszowice towards Kędzierzyn-Koźle or Racibórz
Opole Zachodnie towards Brzeg	PR	Terminus
Opole Zachodnie towards Brzeg	PR	Opole Groszowice towards Kędzierzyn-Koźle
Opole Zachodnie towards Nysa	PR	Terminus
Opole Zachodnie towards Nysa	PR	Opole Gosławice towards Kluczbork
Terminus	PR	Opole Gosławice towards Kluczbork
