= Bytom–Wrocław railway =

Railway line in southern Poland

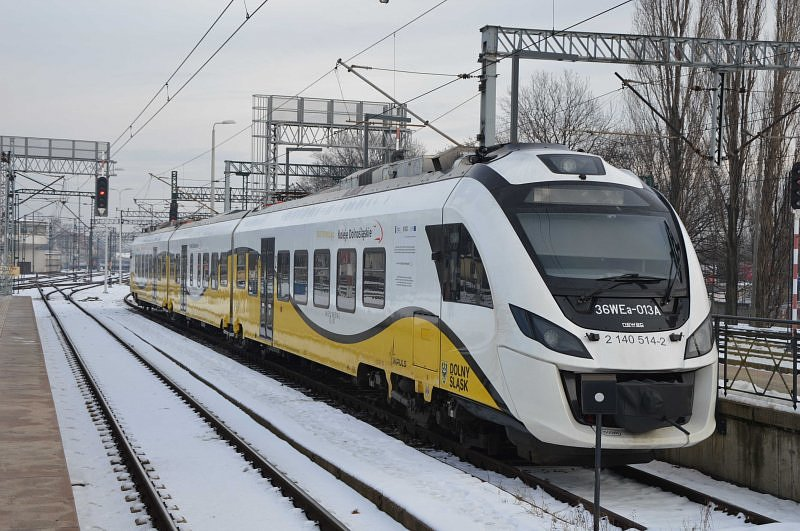
- A Lower Silesian Railways Newag Impuls train east of Wrocław Główny

Overview
- Owner: PKP Polskie Linie Kolejowe
- Line number: PKP 132
- Locale: Silesian Voivodeship; Opole Voivodeship; Lower Silesian Voivodeship
- Termini: Bytom; Wrocław Główny

Technical
- Line length: 164.43 km (102.17 mi)
- Operating speed: 160 km/h (99 mph)

The Bytom–Wrocław railway line is a double-track, electrified railway line running across the Silesian, Opole and Lower Silesian Voivodeships, and as such serving as the main line between Bytom and Wrocław. Between Opole and Wrocław, the railway line is part of the E-30 Pan-European railway corridor, whilst between Pyskowice and Opole, part of the CE-30 line. The lines form the Third Pan-European railway corridor. Between Zabrze and Pyskowice, the railway line has been deconstructed.

In 2011, the line was modernised for a maximum operational speed of 160 km/h (100 mph).

== Gallery ==
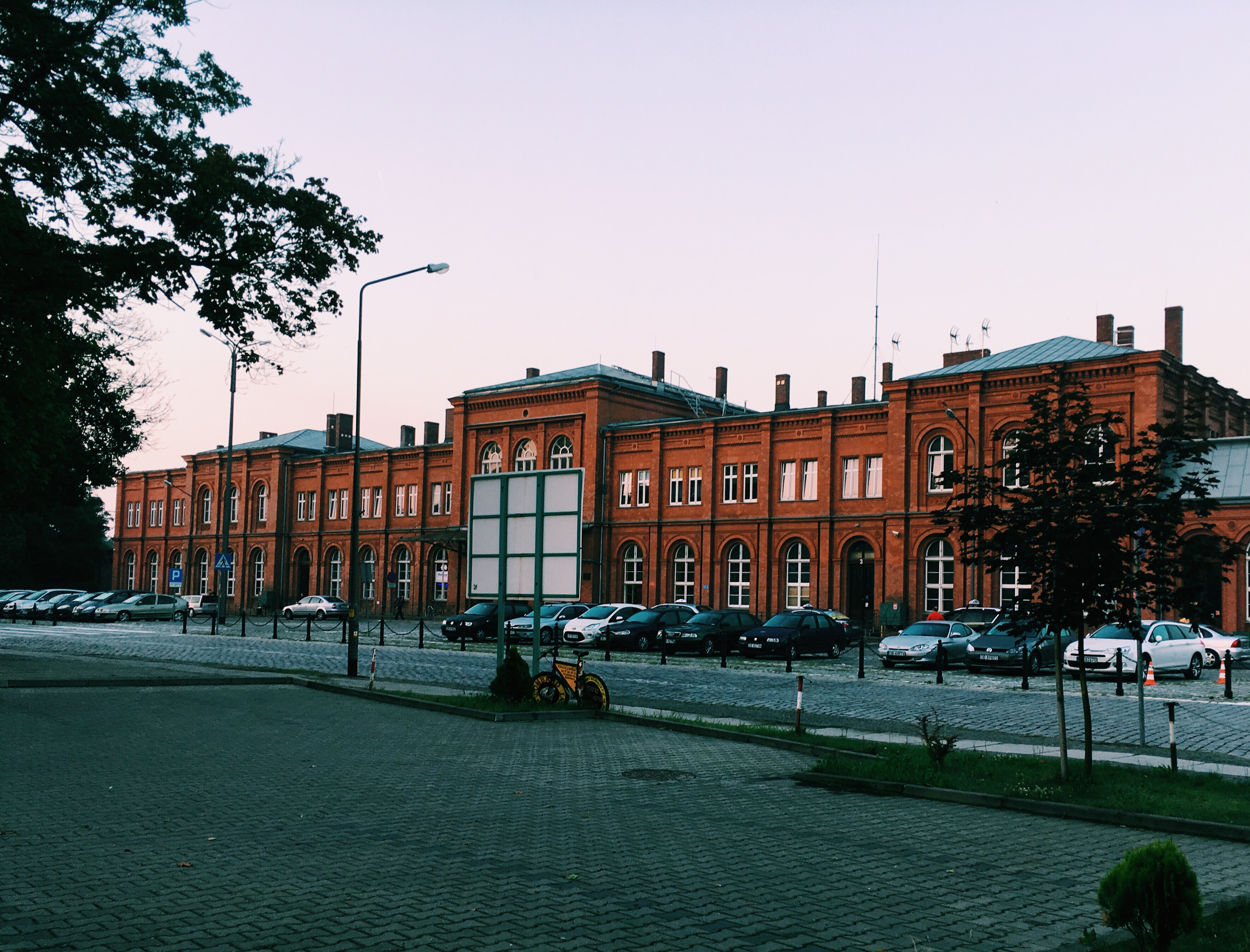
Brzeg railway station

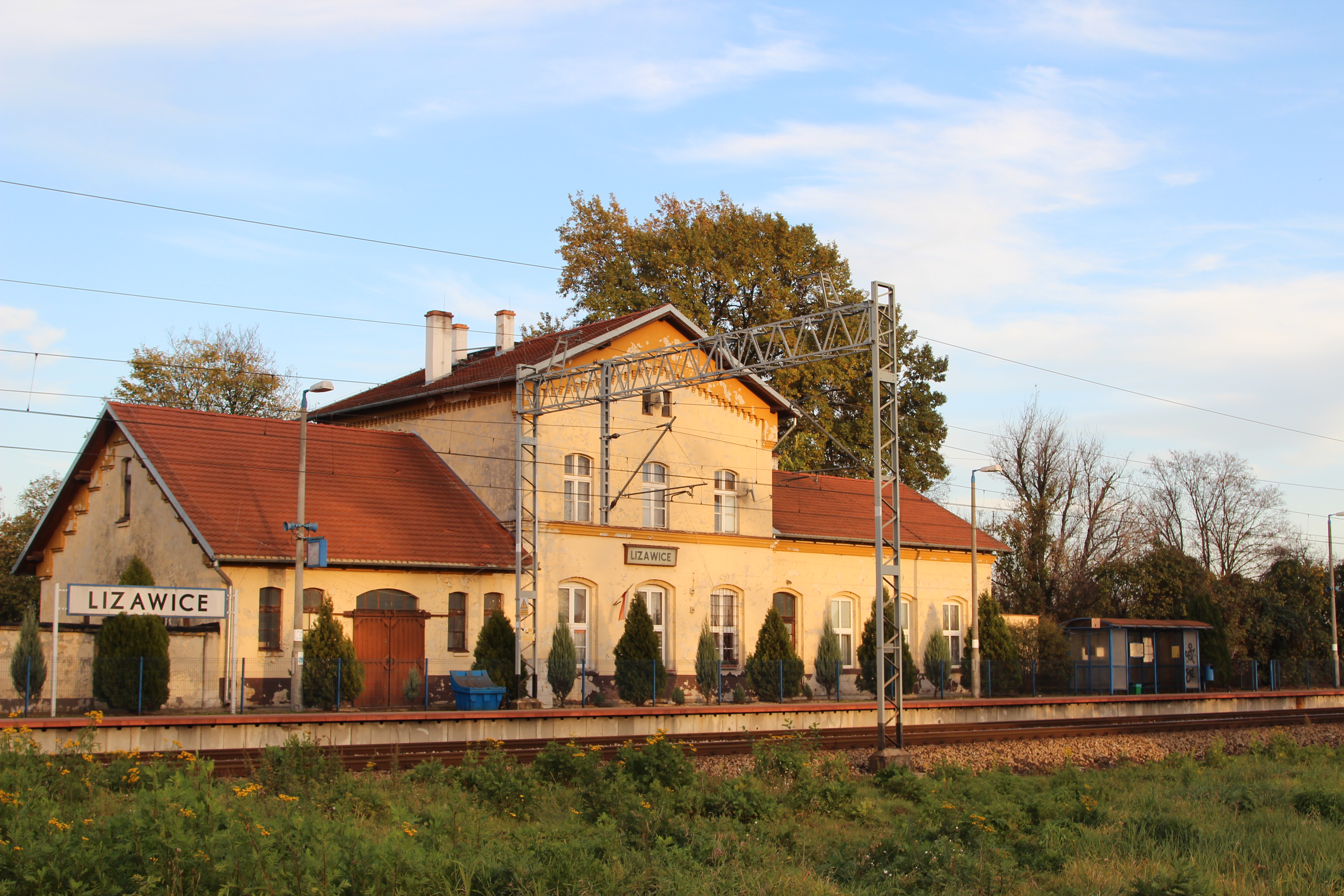
Lizawice railway station
