= Kędzierzyn-Koźle railway station =

Railway station in Poland

Kędzierzyn-Koźle
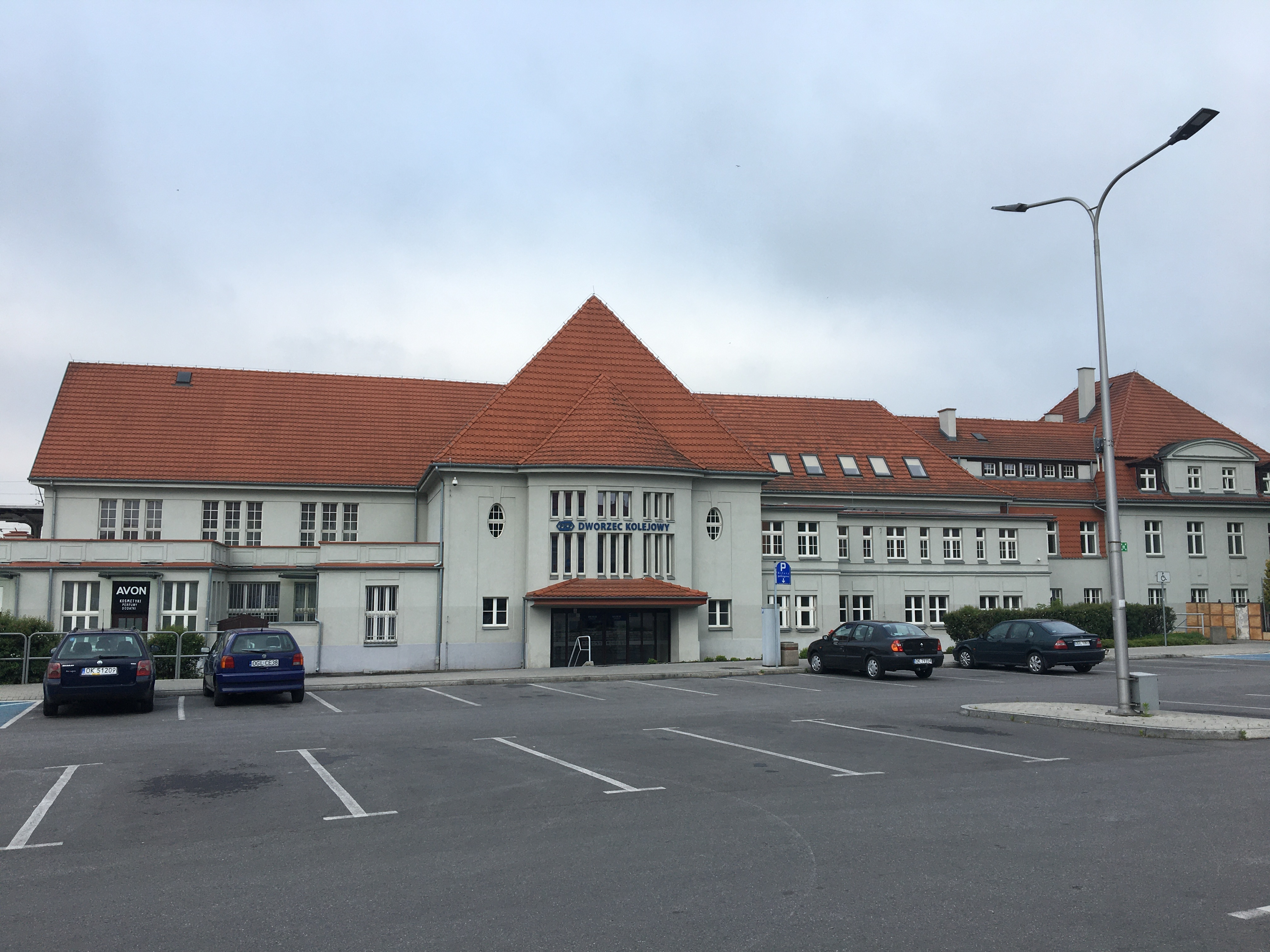
- Kędzierzyn-Koźle station building in 2020

General information
- Location: Kędzierzyn-Koźle, Opole Voivodeship; Poland
- Owner: PKP Polskie Linie Kolejowe
- Lines: Kędzierzyn-Koźle–Opole; Katowice–Legnica railway; Kędierzyn-Koźle–Chałupki; Kłodnica–Kluczbork
- Platforms: 5
- Tracks: 9
- Train operators: PKP Intercity; Polregio; Silesian Railways

History
- Opened: 1845
- Electrified: 1961
- Former names: Kandrzin (before 1846, 1896–1934); Kozel (1846–1876); Cosel-Kandrzin (before 1896); Heydebreck (Oberschleisen) (1934–1945); Kędzierzyn (before 1946)
Location
- Location within Poland Location within Opole Voivodeship

Kędzierzyn-Koźle is a railway station in Kędzierzyn-Koźle, in the Opole Voivodeship in Poland, it one of the largest railway stations in the entire Voivodeship. According to the Polish State Railways classification, it is categorized as a regional station.

== Passenger traffic ==
| Year | Yearly exchange | Passenger exchange per day |
|---|---|---|
| 2017 | 876,000 | 2,400 |
| 2018 | 986,000 | 2,700 |
| 2019 | 949,000 | 2,600 |
| 2020 | 512,000 | 1,400 |
| 2021 | 584,000 | 1,600 |
| 2022 | | 2,400 |

== Description ==
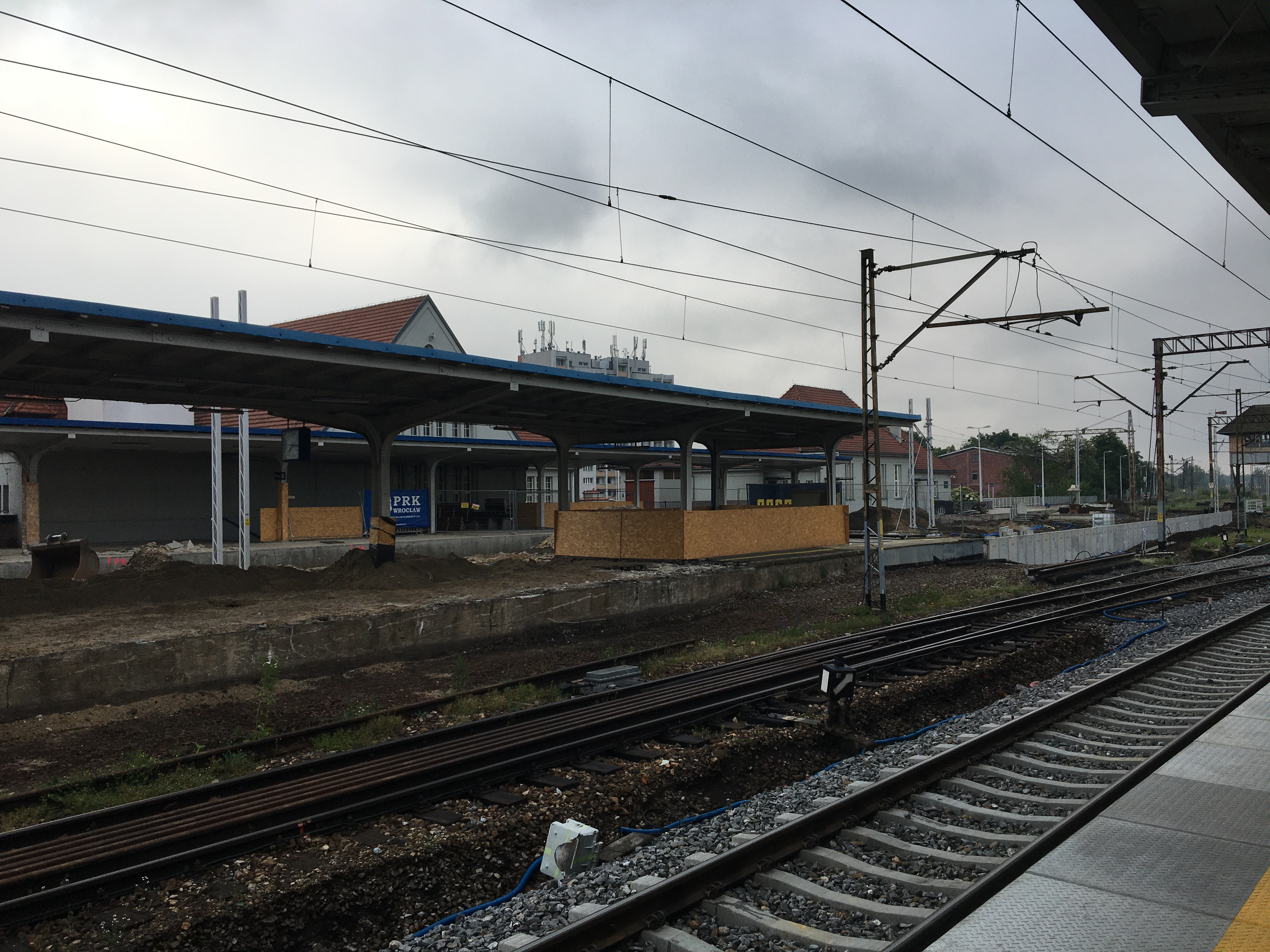
Station platforms during renovation

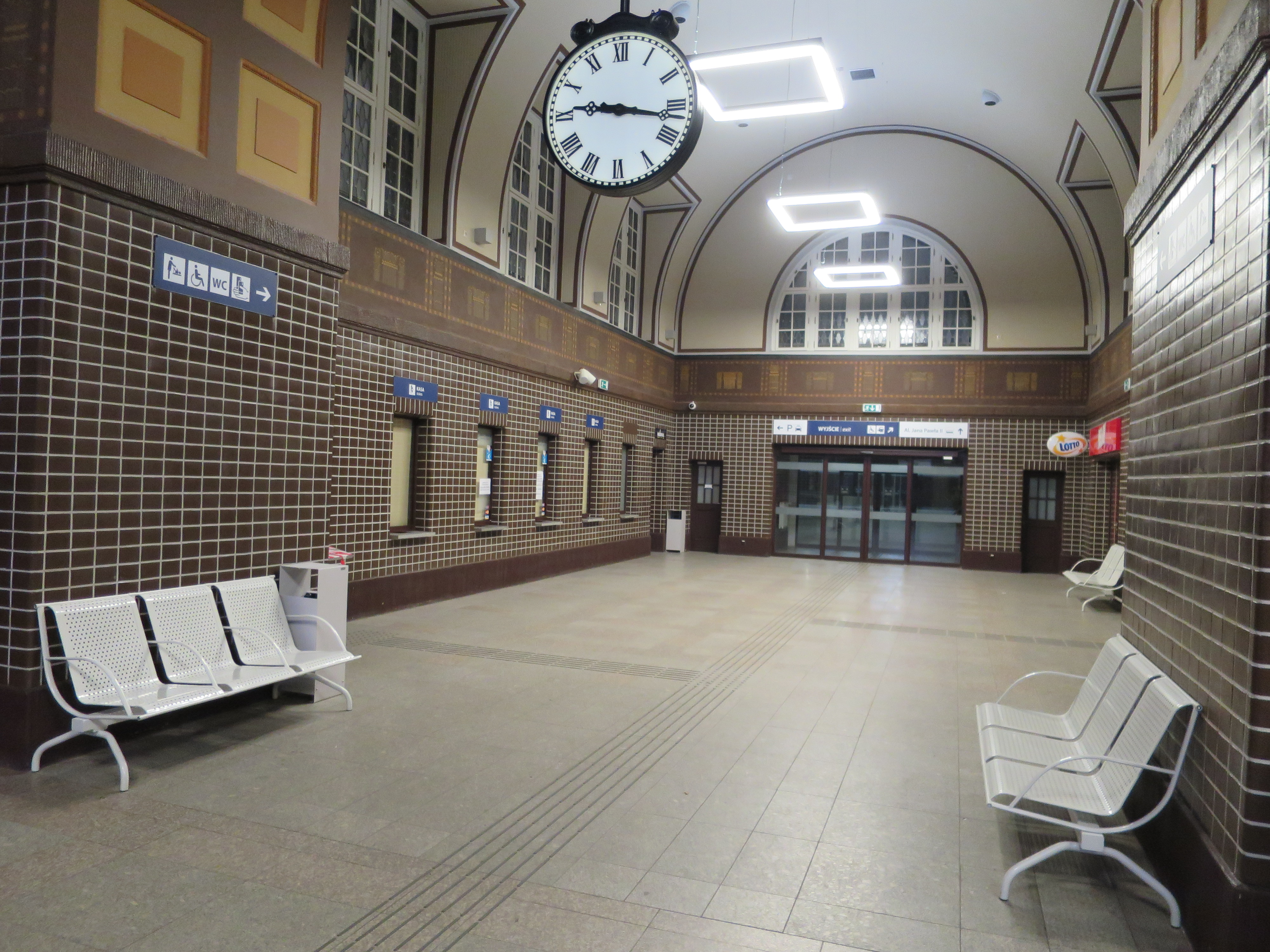
Station interior after renovation

Kędzierzyn Koźle is a junction station of significant importance for both passenger and freight traffic. It has several track groups. On the exit towards Nysa and Opole, there is a passenger section – 5 platforms for passengers and two luggage platforms. The tracks along with the platforms are located on an embankment, while below the embankment there is a station building. Behind the platforms in the direction of Gliwice and Racibórz stretches the freight section of the station – the KKB, KKC, and KKD areas. The passenger section is managed by the KKA signal box with the KK5 operational signal box. In the freight section, there is also a locomotive depot along with a carriage shed. In its area, there is also a platform for the service stop. As a result of PKP's limitation of transport, one set of tracks in the KKB area was dismantled – leaving only the possibility of travel towards the Nowa Wieś post. There are many grade-separated railway crossings here, as well as a separation of passenger and freight traffic. On the approaches to the station, there are branch posts at Nowa Wieś, Kłodnica, Żabieniec, and Stare Koźle, facilitating train traffic management.

== History ==
In 1845, the Opole – Gliwice railway line was launched (the railway station in Kędzierzyn was then called Kozel-Kandrzin). This accelerated the economic development of the entire region.

In 1861, a railway siding was built to the pier on the Kłodnicki Canal.

In 1915, a new railway station was built.

In 1961, the line from Kędzierzyn through Gogolin to Opole was electrified, in 1962 to Gliwice, and in 1969-1970 to Racibórz and Rybnik. At that time, Kędzierzyn was one of the most important railway junctions in Upper Silesia.

In May 2014, PKP signed a contract with the consortium of companies Eko-Bud and Chem-Bud for the renovation of the station. At the end of 2014, PKP terminated it due to a 3-month delay. In May 2015, PKP signed a contract with SKB Development to complete the renovation. As part of the renovation, the façade was restored, doors and windows were replaced, and the interior of the building was renovated. The building has also been equipped with a new passenger information system, surveillance cameras, and baby changing facilities, while bicycle racks have been installed in front of the station. The station has been fully adapted to the needs of people with disabilities. The official reopening of the renovated facility took place on December 17.
