= Rail transport in Gliwice =

Rail transport history and infrastructure in Gliwice, Poland

The history of rail transport in Gliwice began in the first half of the 19th century. The Gliwice railway station ranks among the largest in the Katowice urban area and is classified as a Category A station by the Polish State Railways. Gliwice serves as a hub for international railways, including the E30 and CE30, connecting Dresden with Lviv. The city hosts the Newag Gliwice facility, the Gliwice Wagon Factory, and an intermodal terminal at Gliwice Port, integrating rail, river, and road transport.

== History ==
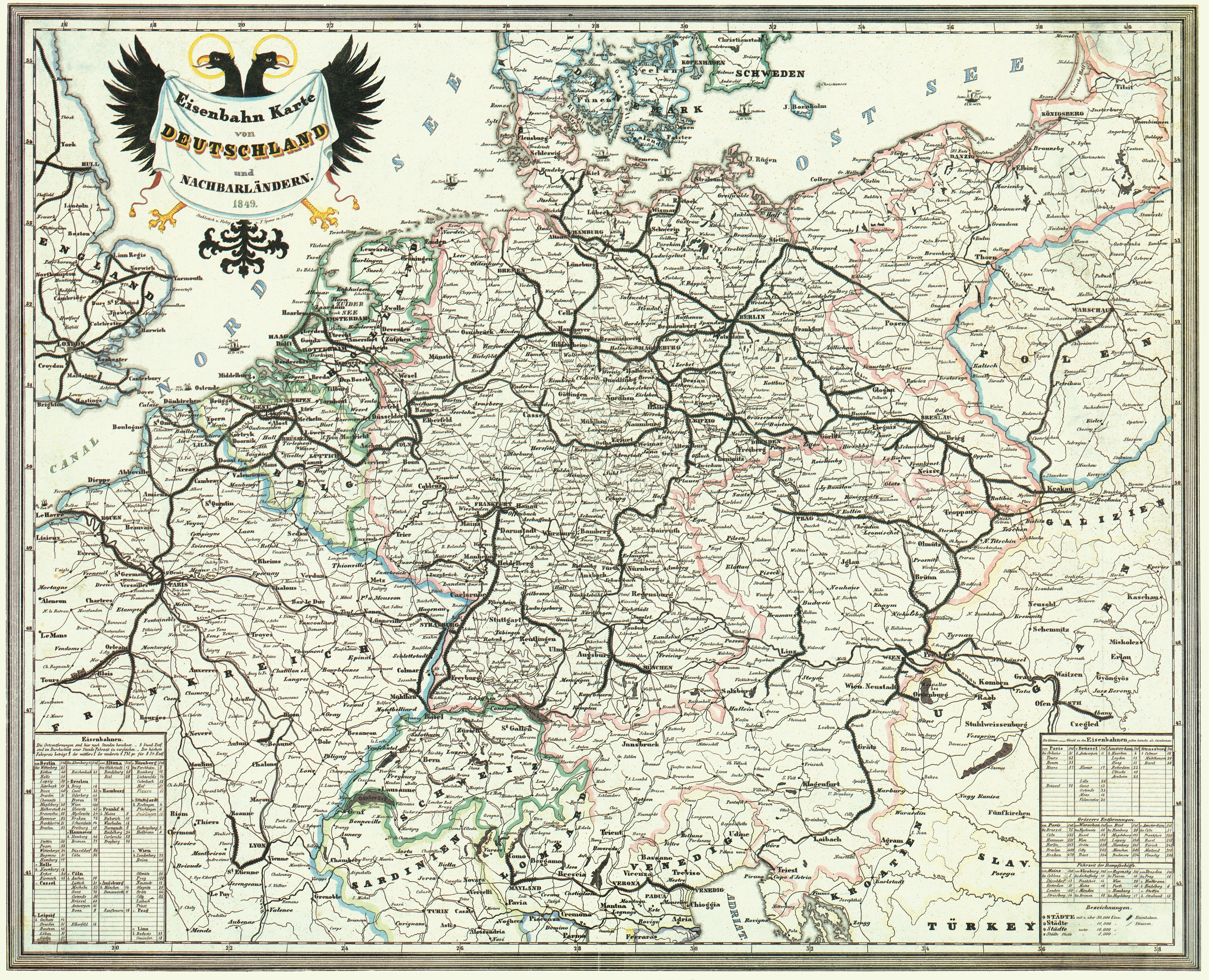
Railway map of the German Empire from 1849

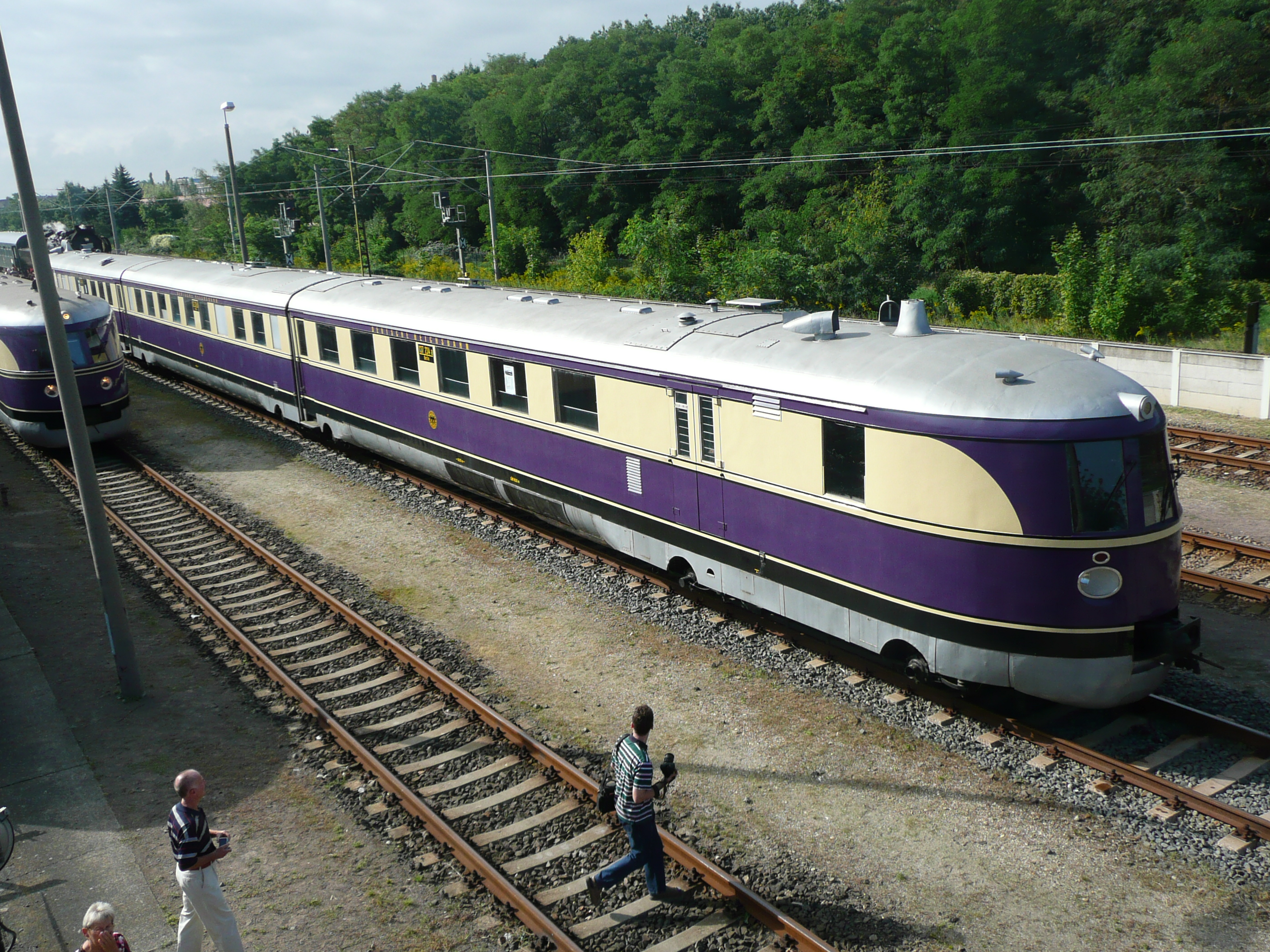
SVT 137 Flying Silesian as a museum exhibit in Delitzsch

=== Prussian period ===
In 1816, Carl Johann Bernhard Karsten proposed the first railway project to connect Upper Silesia with Wrocław. The double-track, steam-powered line, spanning over 200 km, was primarily designed for coal transport, with provisions for passenger services. The project was rejected in Berlin due to the lower cost of transporting coal via the Oder river.

On 3 June 1836, the Silesian bourgeoisie established the Founding Committee of the Upper Silesian Railway (German: Oberschlesische Eisenbahn), led by Count Püchler, president of Oppeln. Disputes over the route eastward from Opole limited initial construction to the section from Wrocław to Opole Zachodnie, completed on 29 May 1843. The final route from Opole to Nowy Bieruń via Gliwice was approved in October 1842. The section to Gliwice opened on 2 October 1845, followed by Świętochłowice two weeks later. The line reached Mysłowice on 3 October 1846, though the planned extension to Bieruń was never built. The 196.3 km line was inaugurated by Prussian King Frederick William IV. The Gliwice Łabędy railway station (German: Laband) also opened in 1846.

In 1846, Gliwice connected to the Prussian railway network via the Berlin–Wrocław railway (German: Niederschlesisch-Märkische Eisenbahn), linking Berlin with Wrocław. In 1847, connections to the Kingdom of Galicia and Lodomeria were established through the Kraków–Upper Silesia railway (German: Krakau-Oberschlesische Eisenbahn), connecting Kraków to Mysłowice. Two years later, access to the Congress Poland was enabled via the Warsaw–Vienna railway.

In 1872, the Upper Silesian Railway opened a line to Bytom, and in 1879, a second line to Opole, bypassing Kędzierzyn-Koźle. In 1883, the railway was nationalized by the Royal Prussian Railway Administration (German: Königlich Preußische Eisenbahn-Verwaltung), which opened a line to Katowice Ligota in 1904. In 1924, Polish State Railways opened a line from the Polish-German border at Gierałtowice, enabling a direct connection to Rybnik, located in Poland after World War I.

In 1895, wagon repair workshops (German: Hauptreparatur-Werkstatt) were commissioned, later becoming the Gliwice Wagon Factory Holding S.A.. On 1 October 1904, the Royal Railway Locomotive Workshops (German: Königliche Eisenbahn-Lokomotivwerkstätte) began operations, functioning as the Locomotive Repair Plant from 1971.

On 25 March 1899, the Upper Silesian Steam Tramways (German: Oberschlesische Dampfstrassenbahnen AG, ODS) opened a narrow-gauge line with a 785 mm gauge from Gliwice Trynek to Rudy. The Gliwice–Racibórz railway was completed in Ratibor Plania in 1903.

In 1913, the first plan to expand the station to its current size was proposed, undergoing several revisions before implementation. Reconstruction of the station's surroundings began in 1923, with the station itself starting on 24 April 1924 and completed on 9 December 1925.

From 15 May 1936 to 21 August 1939, the Flying Silesian (German: Fliegender Schlesier), a luxury express train, operated between Berlin-Charlottenburg and Bytom via Gliwice. Reaching speeds of up to 160 km/h, it was among the fastest trains globally at the time, with a journey from Bytom to Berlin Silesian Station taking 4 hours and 24 minutes.

In 1939, the Gliwice Canal (German: Gleiwitzer Kanal) was completed, ending at the Gliwice Port in Łabędy, served by the Gliwice Port railway station.

=== Polish period ===
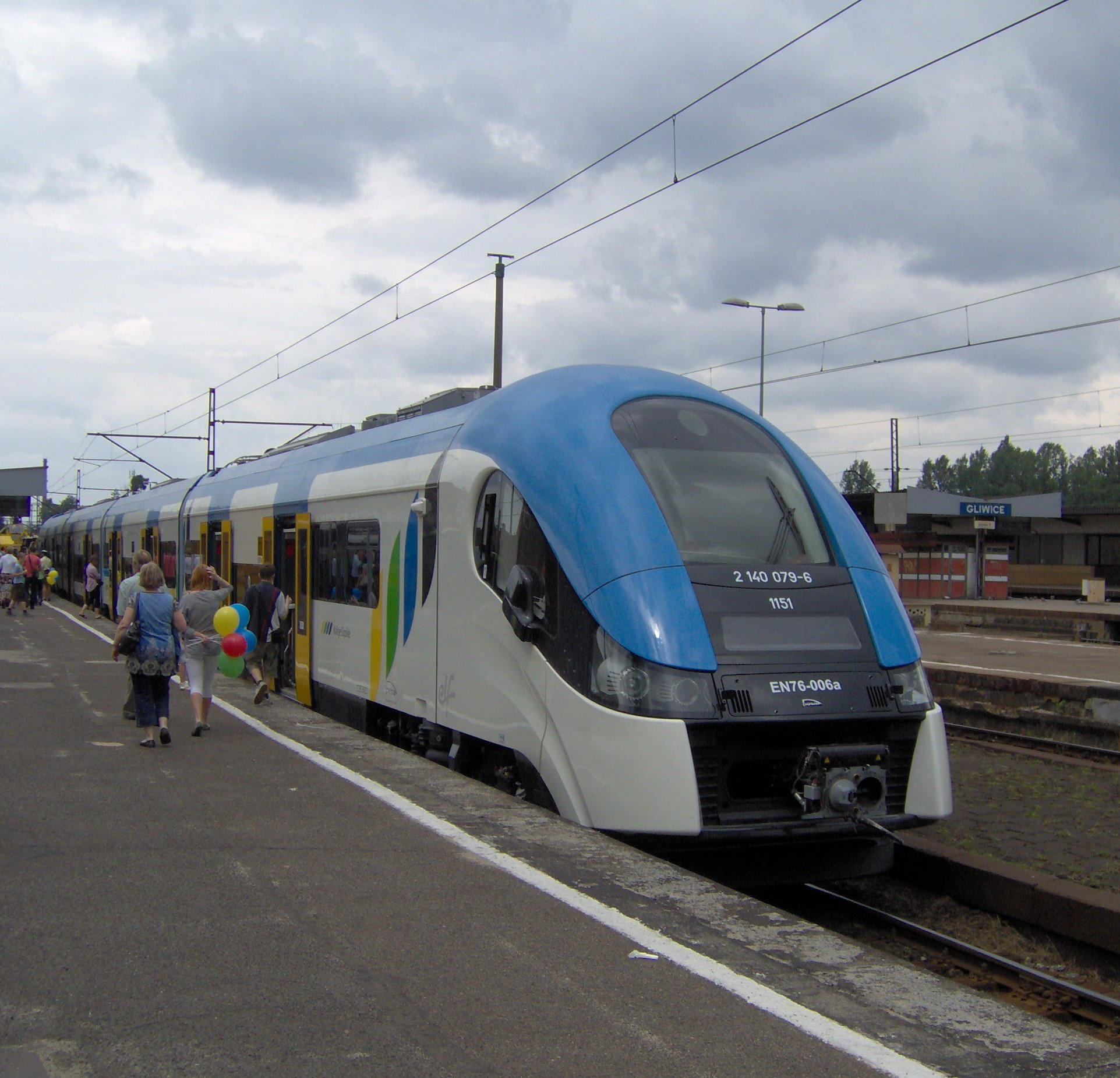
Elf of Silesian Railways at Gliwice railway station

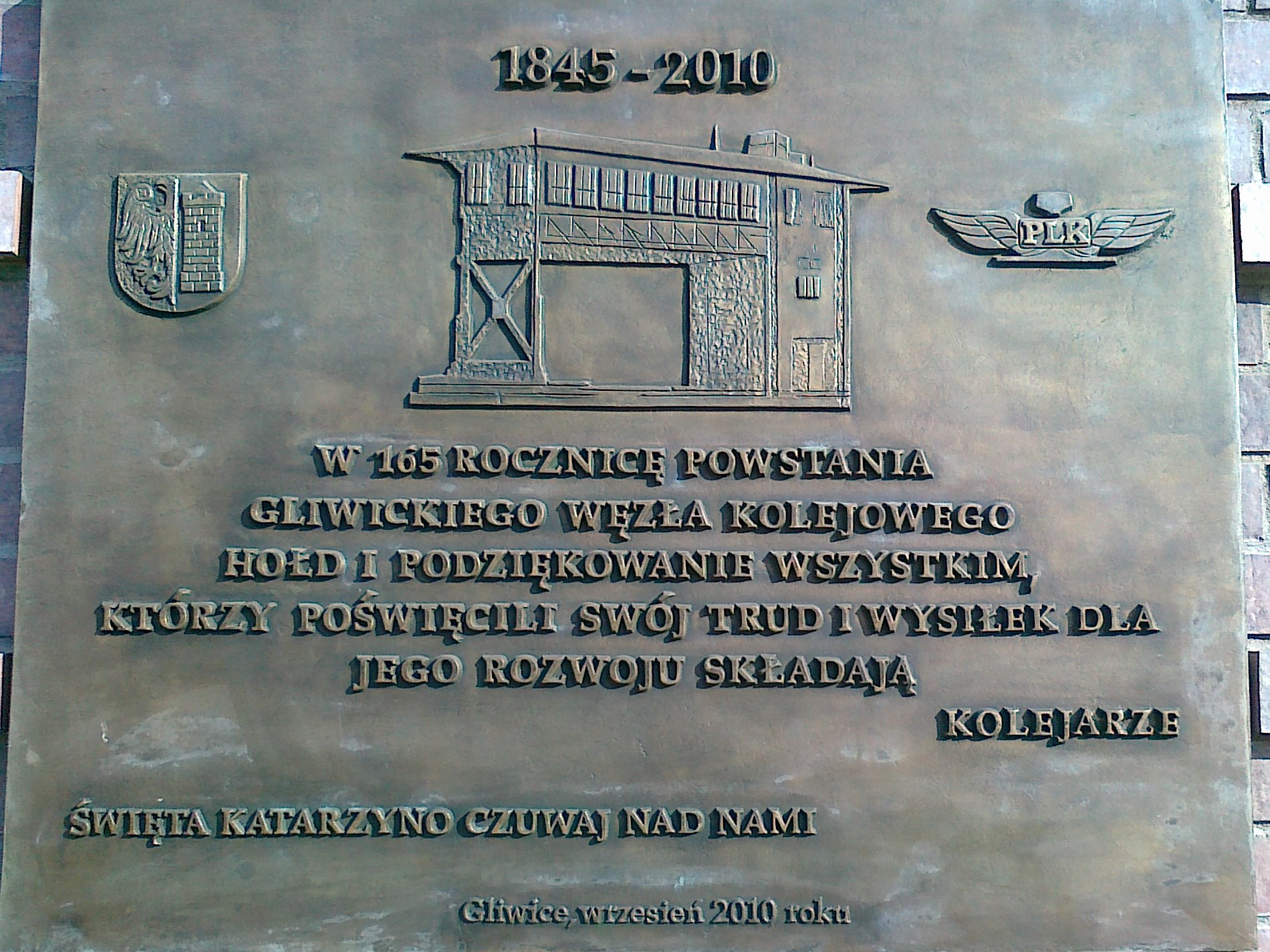
Commemorative plaque on the Gliwice railway station building

In December 1952, an express connection to Warsaw was launched using a diesel railcar MsBx, replaced in 1958 by an electric multiple unit E58 as the express Górnik.

In the 1950s, intensive railway electrification began: the line to Katowice was electrified on 1 June 1957, to Opole via Strzelce Opolskie on 3 October 1960, to Kędzierzyn-Koźle on 18 July 1962, to Katowice Ligota on 8 September 1977, and to Bytom on 23 December 1980.

Starting in the 1960s, passenger services were gradually discontinued: to Racibórz Markowice on 1 July 1966, to Lubliniec on 15 October 1973, to Rudy on 4 November 1991, to Jastrzębie Zdrój on 9 January 1995, to Katowice Ligota and beyond on 1 June 1997, and to Rybnik on 28 November 2000. The connection to Bytom was discontinued on 31 July 2001, reactivated on 31 January 2008, and suspended again on 1 March 2012.

In 1992, the Górnik express was reclassified as an InterCity service, becoming the first InterCity train to stop in Gliwice. In 1993, the station was expanded with a fourth platform, constructed by dismantling the third baggage platform.

In 2010, revitalization began on the line to Opole (lines Katowice–Legnica railway, Gliwice Łabędy–Pyskowice railway, and Bytom–Wrocław railway). On 1 October 2011, Silesian Railways launched trains on the Gliwice–Częstochowa route. On 1 February 2013, Silesian Railways reactivated the Gliwice–Bytom line, but suspended it again on 1 June 2013. In 2013, revitalization of the line to Katowice (Katowice–Legnica railway) began.

On 13 December 2015, Express InterCity Premium trains, operated by ED250 Pendolino, began stopping in Gliwice.

== Railways ==
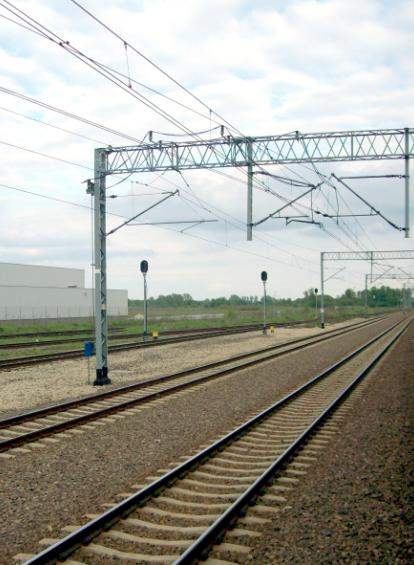
E 30 railway

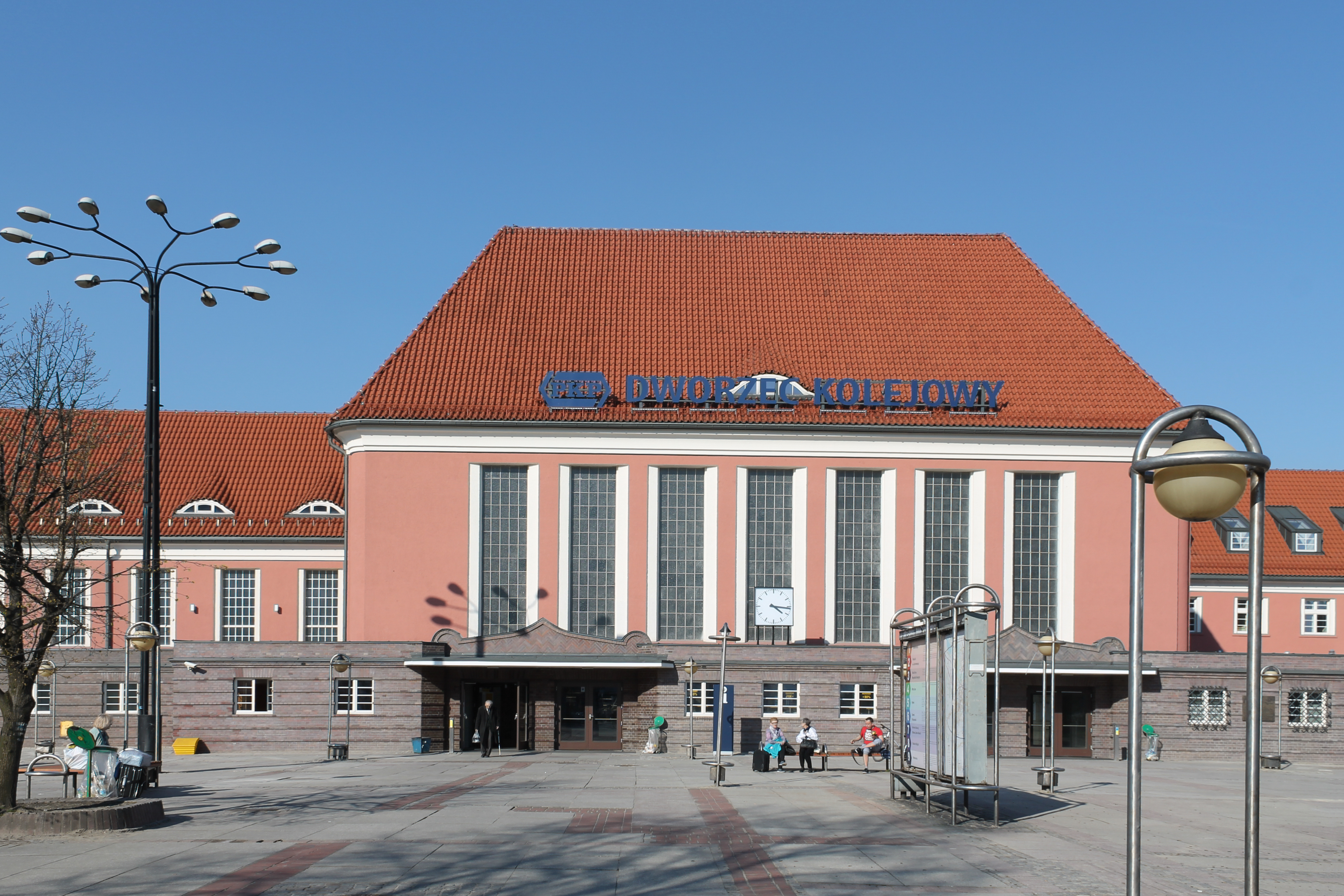
Gliwice railway station

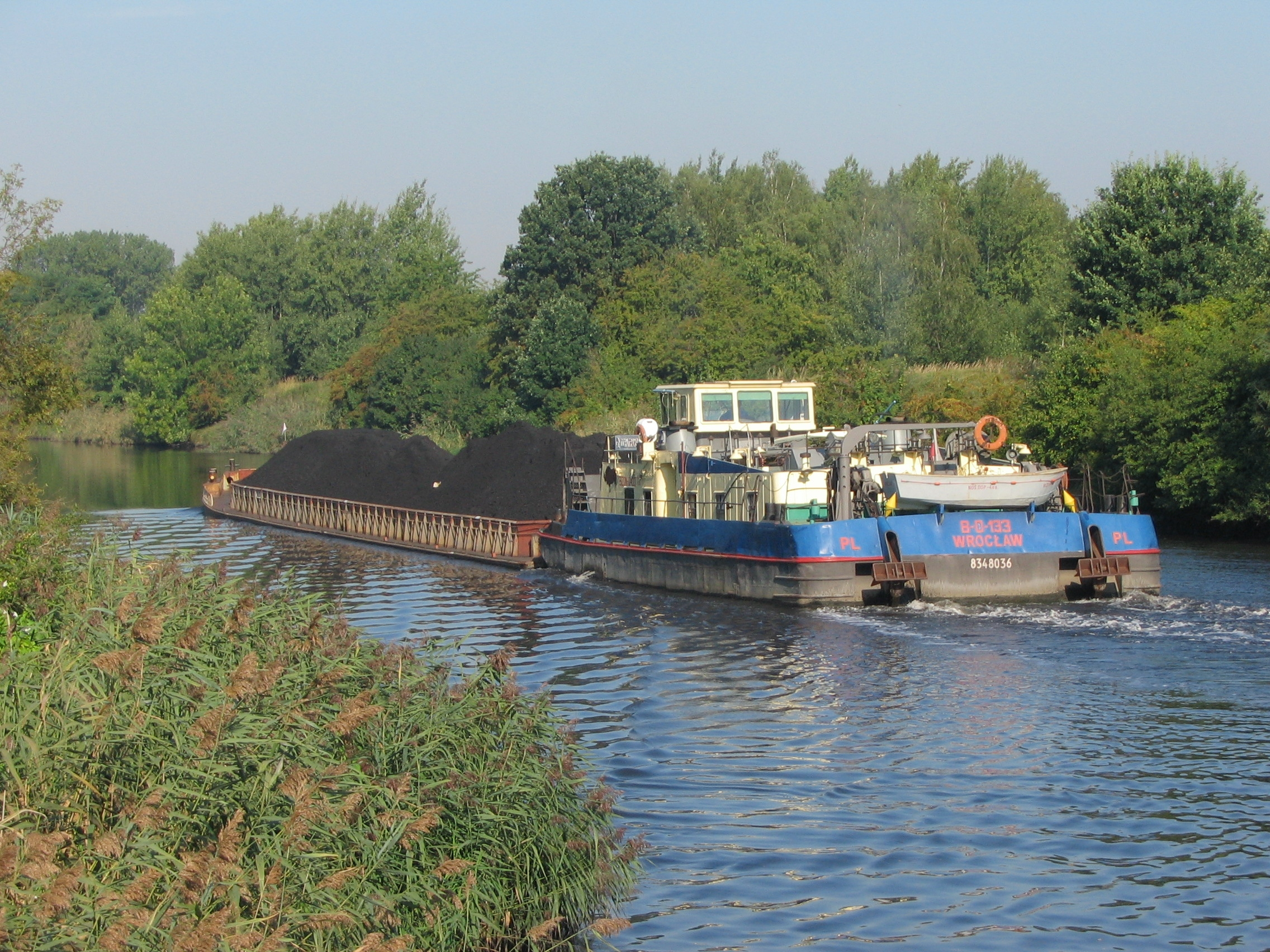
Gliwice Canal

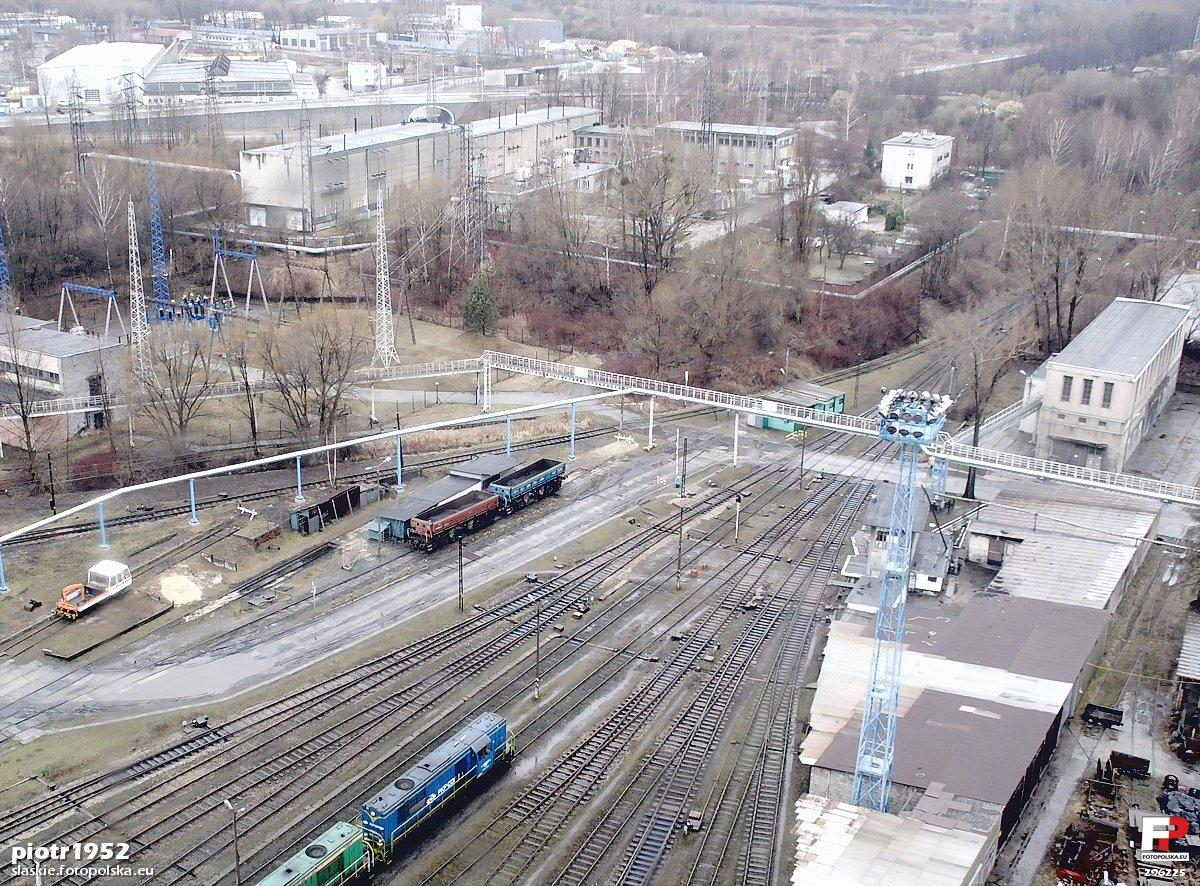
Siding to Sośnica Coal Mine

=== Standard-gauge ===
Gliwice is served by Katowice–Legnica railway, part of the European E 30 railway (Dresden–Moscow Kiyevsky).

From Gliwice railway station, railways Katowice Ligota–Gliwice (to Katowice Ligota), Zabrze Biskupice–Gliwice (to Zabrze Biskupice), and Gliwice–Gliwice Sośnica KWK Sośnica Makoszowy (to Sośnica Coal Mine) originate. From Gliwice Łabędy, Gliwice Łabędy–Pyskowice railway extends to Opole Główne via Strzelce Opolskie.

Gliwice railway station is connected to Łabędy by an additional railway, Gliwice–Gliwice Łabędy, and to Gliwice Sośnica by Gliwice–Gliwice Sośnica KWK Sośnica Makoszowy railway.

Passenger services operate on Gliwice Łabędy–Pyskowice railway (Opole), Katowice–Legnica railway (Katowice, Kędzierzyn-Koźle, Opole), and Zabrze Biskupice–Gliwice (Bytom). Other railways are used solely for freight.

=== Narrow-gauge ===
All narrow-gauge railways in Gliwice are inactive and largely dismantled. On 1 March 1993, the narrow-gauge railway was listed as a heritage site. The 2009 Gliwice Spatial Development Study proposes restoring the narrow-gauge railway for tourism.

== Operating points ==
=== Active ===
The main station in Gliwice is Gliwice railway station, located in Śródmieście district. It is the second-largest station in the Katowice urban area and is classified as Category A by the Polish State Railways. In the Łabędy district, Gliwice Łabędy railway station lies at the junction of lines to Opole (Gliwice Łabędy–Pyskowice railway) and Kędzierzyn-Koźle (Katowice–Legnica railway). Beyond Łabędy, on Gliwice Łabędy–Pyskowice railway, is the Gliwice Kuźnica railway station.

Freight traffic, in addition to Gliwice and Gliwice Łabędy railway stations, is handled by Gliwice Port railway station, located at the start of the Gliwice Canal, and Gliwice Sośnica railway station, which served passengers until 1 June 1997.

Name	Type	Number of platform edges	Infrastructure	Former names
Gliwice	Railway station	8	Ticket offices Ticket machines Waiting room Underground passages Water towers Inactive motive power depot	Gleiwitz (1845–1884); Gleiwitz Staatsbahnhof (1885–1920); Gleiwitz (1921–1930); Gleiwitz Hauptbahnhof (1931–1945)
Gliwice Kuźnica	Railway station	2	Shelters	Rotfeld (1942–1945); Łabędy (Przystanek) (1945–1946); Łabędy Przystanek (1947–1967)
Gliwice Łabędy	Railway station	4	Shelters	Laband (1845–1945); Łabędy (1945–1967)
Gliwice Port	Goods station			Gleiwitz Hafen (1936–1945)
Gliwice Sośnica	Railway station	2	Inactive motive power depot	Sosnitza (1855–1935); Gleiwitz Ost (Sosnitza) (1936–1939); Gleiwitz Ost (1940–1945)
KWK Sośnica	Siding			
Szobiszowice	Junction			

=== Inactive ===
On Katowice Ligota–Gliwice, between Gliwice and Gliwice Sośnica, there are two inactive service stops: Gliwice Lokomotywownia and Gliwice ZNTK.

All narrow-gauge stops in Gliwice are inactive.

== Station sidings ==
Gliwice hosts sidings serving various companies:

Station	User
Gliwice	Wire and Wire Products Factory
Gliwice	Gliwice Wagon Factory
Gliwice	Kem
Gliwice	Marbet-Wil
Gliwice	Newag Gliwice
Gliwice	Gliwice Container Terminal – PKP Cargo
Gliwice Łabędy	KOL-TRANS-HUT
Gliwice Łabędy	MULLER die Logistik Polska
Gliwice Łabędy	PKP Energetyka
Gliwice Port	DB Schenker Rail Zabrze
Gliwice Port	Erovia Polska
Gliwice Port	Military Unit No. 1933
Gliwice Port	M. Preymesser Logistyka
Gliwice Port	Silesian Logistics Centre
Gliwice Port	Silesian Logistics Centre – Opel

== Accidents ==
- On 4 April 1866, a freight train derailed on the Gliwice–Zabrze section, resulting in one fatality and two injuries.
- On 12 January 1994, the last carriage of an international train from Kraków Główny to Berlin-Lichtenberg derailed at Gliwice Łabędy railway station, causing one death and seven injuries.
- On 14 July 2005, two freight trains collided near the Gl2 signal box, resulting in one fatality and one injury.

== Education ==
In 1953, the Railway Technical School was established in Gliwice, building on a school founded in 1945 in Kędzierzyn. In 1954, it opened a dormitory in nearby Zameczek Leśny. In 1956, a department for working professionals was added, and the dormitory was relocated to 15 Górnych Wałów Street. In 1965, a new school building was completed, and in 1985, the dormitory moved to 10 Krakusa Street. The department for working professionals closed in 1991, and in 2002, the school adopted its current name, Technical and IT School Complex. In 2013, Silesian Railways sponsored a class training railway electro-energetic technicians.

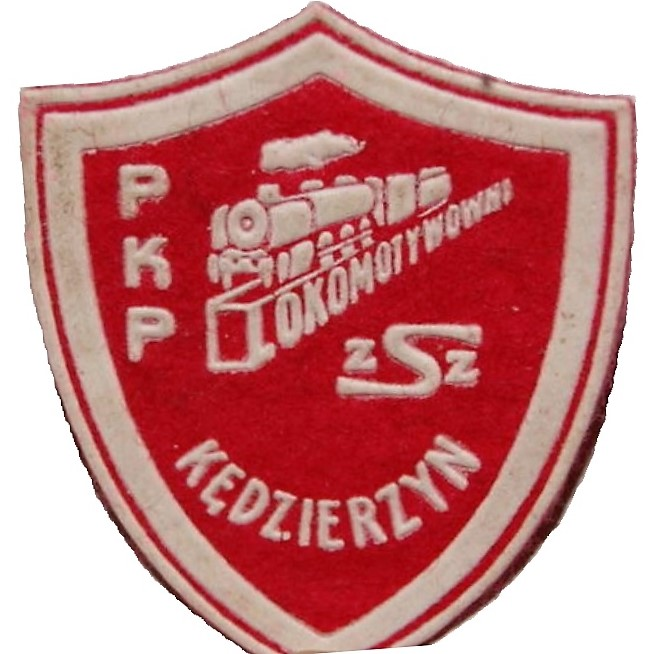
School badge of ZSZ PKP in Kędzierzyn

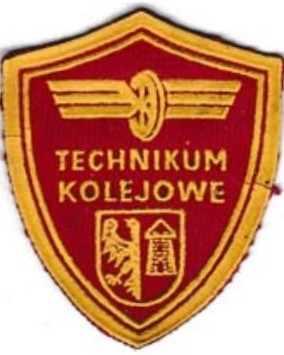
School badge of the Railway Technical School in Gliwice

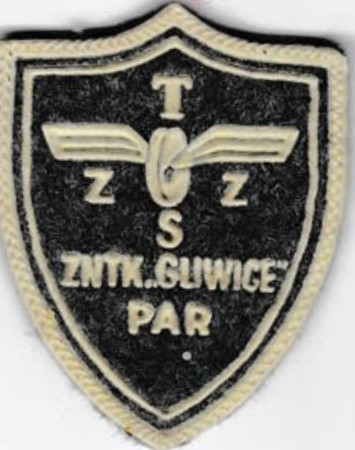
School badge of ZSZ PKP in Gliwice

== Railway sports clubs ==
From 1926 to 1945, the railway sports club Reichsbahn SG 1926 Gleiwitz operated in Gliwice, with its home stadium, RSG-Stadion, at present-day Sportowa Street. In August 1945, the KKS Kolejarz Gliwice club was founded, taking over the RSG stadium.
