= Proteza koniecpolska railway =

The "Proteza koniecpolska" (literally "Koniecpol prosthesis") is a colloquial term for a rail project in Poland completed in 2013 to give Częstochowa improved connections with Warsaw, Wrocław and Opole using existing rail lines.

The link connected two already modernized major trunk lines the Central Rail Line near Włoszczowa and the PKP rail line 132 near Opole by tracks modernized for speeds up to 120 and 140 km/h (75 and 85 mph), running through the Częstochowa Stradom railway station. This decreased travel times between Warszawa Centralna and Wrocław Główny railway station from over 5 hours to 3 hours 45 minutes.

The city of Wrocław despite being the largest urban center in southwestern Poland and the fourth largest city in the country lacks a direct rail connection with capital and largest city Warsaw. During the 19th century, when most of the rail lines were laid out, the territory of Poland was divided between neighboring powers, with Warsaw controlled by Russians as part of Congress Poland while Wrocław along with the region of Silesia and with northern Poland was ruled by the German Kingdom of Prussia, both of which invested primarily in connecting the cities with their own infrastructure. A dedicated high speed rail line from Warsaw through Łódź to Wrocław and further to the border with the Czech Republic is being planned.

At the end of the 20th century trains to Wrocław traveled along PKP rail line 1 from Warsaw to Częstochowa through the main Częstochowa railway station, from there along local lines, PKP rail line 61 and PKP rail line 144 to Opole, continuing on line 132 to Wrocław, with the fastest travel times being 4 hours 25 minutes. At the beginning of the 21st century this connection was suspended due to modernization work on the line 1 between Warsaw and Częstochowa, and trains to Wrocław had to routed through Poznań on PKP rail line 271 and PKP rail line 3 or through Katowice on line 132 and the Central Rail Line, extending travel times to over five hours. To mitigate this situation a proposal was raised to upgrade the technical parameters of the lines 61 and 144 to create an effective shortcut between the two trunk lines from Opole through Częstochowa Stradom to Włoszczowa on the Central Rail Line, decreasing travel times below four hours. This project has been dubbed the Koniecpol prosthesis for the railway station located between Częstochowa and Włoszczowa.
