= Częstochowa Raków railway station =

Railway station in Częstochowa, Poland

Częstochowa Raków
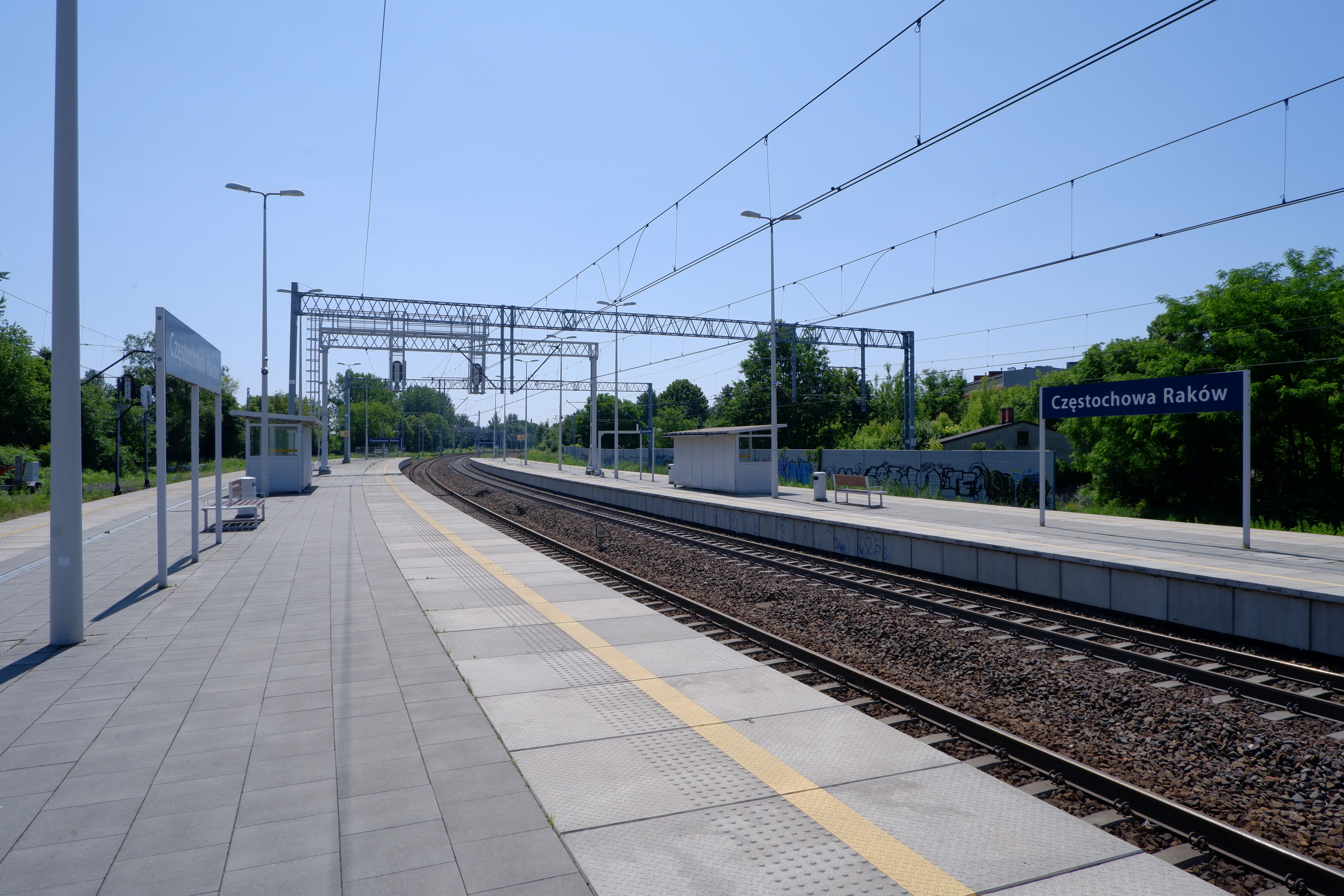

General information
- Location: Raków, Częstochowa; Poland
- Coordinates: 50°47′15″N 19°09′19″E
- Owner: Polish State Railways

Services
Preceding station	Polregio	Following station
Częstochowa Terminus	PR	Kusięta Nowe towards Włoszczowa, Kielce or Busko-Zdrój
Preceding station	KŚ	Following station
Korwinów towards Gliwice	S1	Częstochowa Terminus
Korwinów towards Tychy Lodowisko	S41	Częstochowa Terminus
Location

Częstochowa Raków railway station is a railway station in the Raków district of Częstochowa, Poland. It is served by the Polish State Railways, who run services from Warsaw West to Katowice (line 1) and from Częstochowa to Kucelinka (line 701).

The historical names of the station are: Bleszno (1914–1918), Bierzno (1918–1920), Błeszno (1920–1939), Bleschno (1939–1945), Błeszno (1945–1948) and Częstochowa Błeszno (1948–1966).

== Train services ==
The station is served by the following service(s):

- Regional services (PR) Częstochowa - Włoszczowa
- Regional services (PR) Częstochowa - Włoszczowa - Kielce
- Regional services (PR) Częstochowa - Włoszczowa - Kielce - Busko-Zdrój
- Regional Service (KŚ) S1 Gliwice – Zabrze - Katowice – Zawiercie - Częstochowa
- Regional services (KŚ) S41 Tychy Lodowisko - Katowice - Sosnowiec Główny - Dąbrowa Górnicza Ząbkowice - Zawiercie
