= Strzelce Opolskie railway station =

Railway station in Strzelce Opolskie, Poland

Strzelce Opolskie
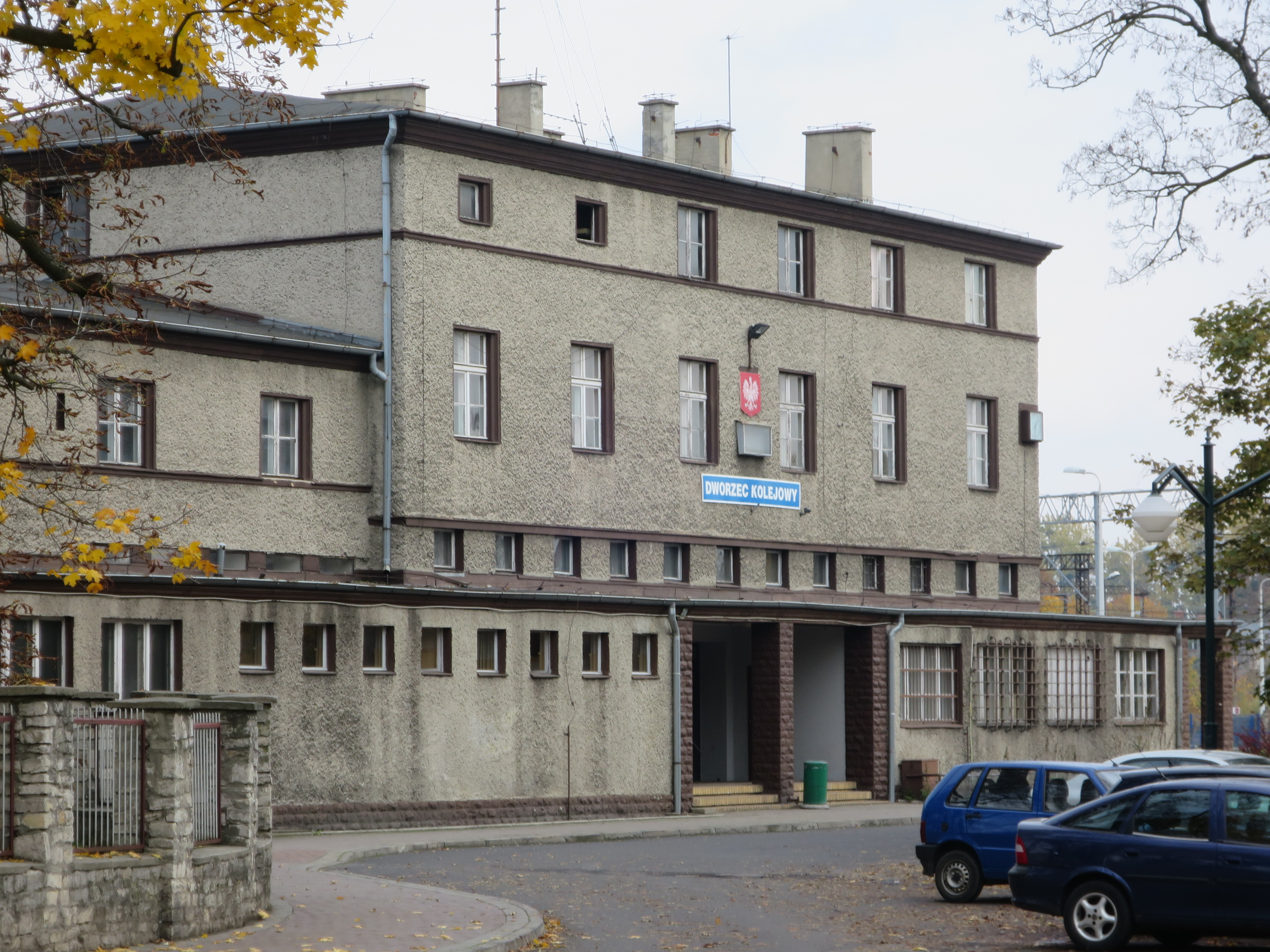

General information
- Location: Strzelce Opolskie, Opole Voivodeship; Poland
- Coordinates: 50.3100°N 18.1823°E
- Owner: Polskie Koleje Państwowe S.A.
- Platforms: 3

History
- Opened: 1878
- Former names: Groß Strehlitz, Strzelce Wielkie

Services
Preceding station	PKP Intercity	Following station
Opole Wschodnie towards Szklarska Poręba Górna	TLK via Katowice	Gliwice towards Warszawa Wschodnia
Preceding station	Polregio	Following station
Szymiszów towards Opole Główne	PR	Błotnica Strzelecka towards Gliwice
Location
- Location within Poland

Strzelce Opolskie railway station is a station in Strzelce Opolskie, Opole Voivodeship, Poland. The building is located by 6 Dworcowa Street.

The modern-day railway station was built in 1935 to meet the then modern-day standards. The railway station was at its height in the Interwar period and during the Polish People's Republic, with trains heading to Fosowskie and Kędzierzyn-Koźle. Formerly, there also existed an industrial spur to the industrial complex of Agromet-Pionier and Zakłady Wapiennicze. In the 1990s, when the Polskie Koleje Państwowe were hit by a general financial crisis, the railway station fell into ruins. The waiting room, baggage hold and public washrooms were closed due to the deteriorating state of the building. In 2000, the direct routes to Fosowskie and Kędzierzyn-Koźle were terminated.

Between 2013 and 2014, together with the modernisation of the Błotnica Strzelecka - Opole Groszowice railway line, the railway station platforms and tunnel were renovated. As a result, the railway station was revivied, with increasing Tanie Linie Kolejowe and PKP Intercity connections.

== Connections ==
- 132 Bytom - Wrocław Główny
- 175 Zimna Wódka - Rozmierka.

== Train services ==
The station is served by the following service(s):

- Intercity services (TLK) Warszawa - Częstochowa - Katowice - Opole - Wrocław - Szklarska Poręba Górna
- Regional services (R) Opole Główne - Gliwice
