= Kielce railway station =

Railway station in Kielce, Poland

Kielce Główne Kielce Main Station
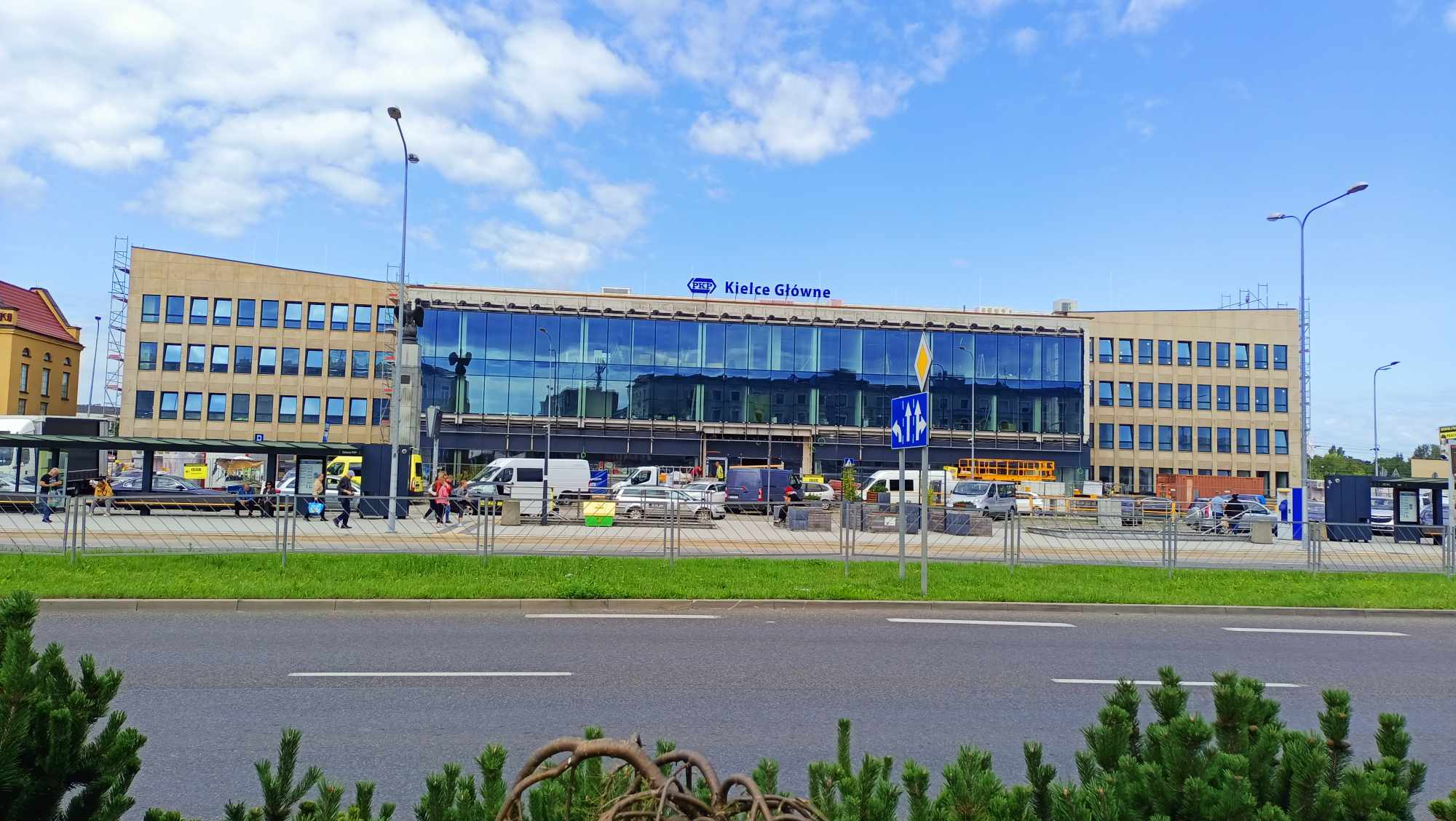

General information
- Location: Kielce, Świętokrzyskie Voivodeship; Poland
- Coordinates: 50°52′27″N 20°37′04″E
- System: Railway Station
- Owner: Polskie Koleje Państwowe S.A.
- Platforms: 3
- Tracks: 5

History
- Opened: 1885; 141 years ago

Services
Preceding station	PKP Intercity	Following station
Suchedniów towards Kołobrzeg	TLK	Jędrzejów towards Kraków Główny
Preceding station	Polregio	Following station
Kielce Herbskie towards Częstochowa	PR	Terminus
Kielce Herbskie towards Częstochowa	PR	Kielce Białogon towards Busko-Zdrój
Location

Kielce Główne, in English known as Kielce Main Station, is a railway station in Kielce, Świętokrzyskie Voivodeship (Holy Cross Province), Poland. According to the classification of passenger stations in Poland, it belongs to Voivodeship station. In 2018, the station served approximately 5,400 passengers a day.

== History ==
The history of the station dates back to 1885. It was opened on 25 January that year, when the construction of the line linking Iwanogród (Dęblin) and Dąbrowa Górnicza was completed. During World War I, the Russians partially blew it up, but the railway station was rebuilt soon after by the Austrians who occupied the city in a slightly changed form. During the war in 1939, one of the wings and the front part from the track side were damaged. The damage was repaired by the Germans, removing details from the façade and changing the shape of the windows. The building existed in this form until 1966. Five years later, in 1971, a new station building with greater functionality than the previous one was put into use. In 2022, renovation work began during which the current station was demolished and a new station of the same design was built. It is to gain new functionality and greater accessibility for travellers. The modernisation of the station is expected to be completed at the end of 2023.

== Train services ==
Currently, Kielce is an important intersection of railway lines, running to Częstochowa and Lubliniec, Warsaw, Kraków and Sandomierz.

The station is served by the following service(s):

- Intercity services (TLK) Kołobrzeg — Gdynia Główna — Warszawa Wschodnia — Kraków Główny
- Regional services (PR) Częstochowa - Włoszczowa - Kielce Główne
- Regional services (PR) Częstochowa - Włoszczowa - Kielce Główne - Busko-Zdrój

== Bus services ==
In the vicinity of the train station (exactly on Żelazna Street), there are 3 stops served by a total of 14 bus lines (0Z, 5, 13, 33, 34, 44, 45, 46, 50, 51, 54, 114, N1, N2). The Kielce Bus Station is located near the train station, which was put into use again in 2020 after reconstruction.
