= Raków, Częstochowa =

District of Częstochowa, Poland

Raków
- Dzielnica
- View looking down the area's main thoroughfare Peace Alley

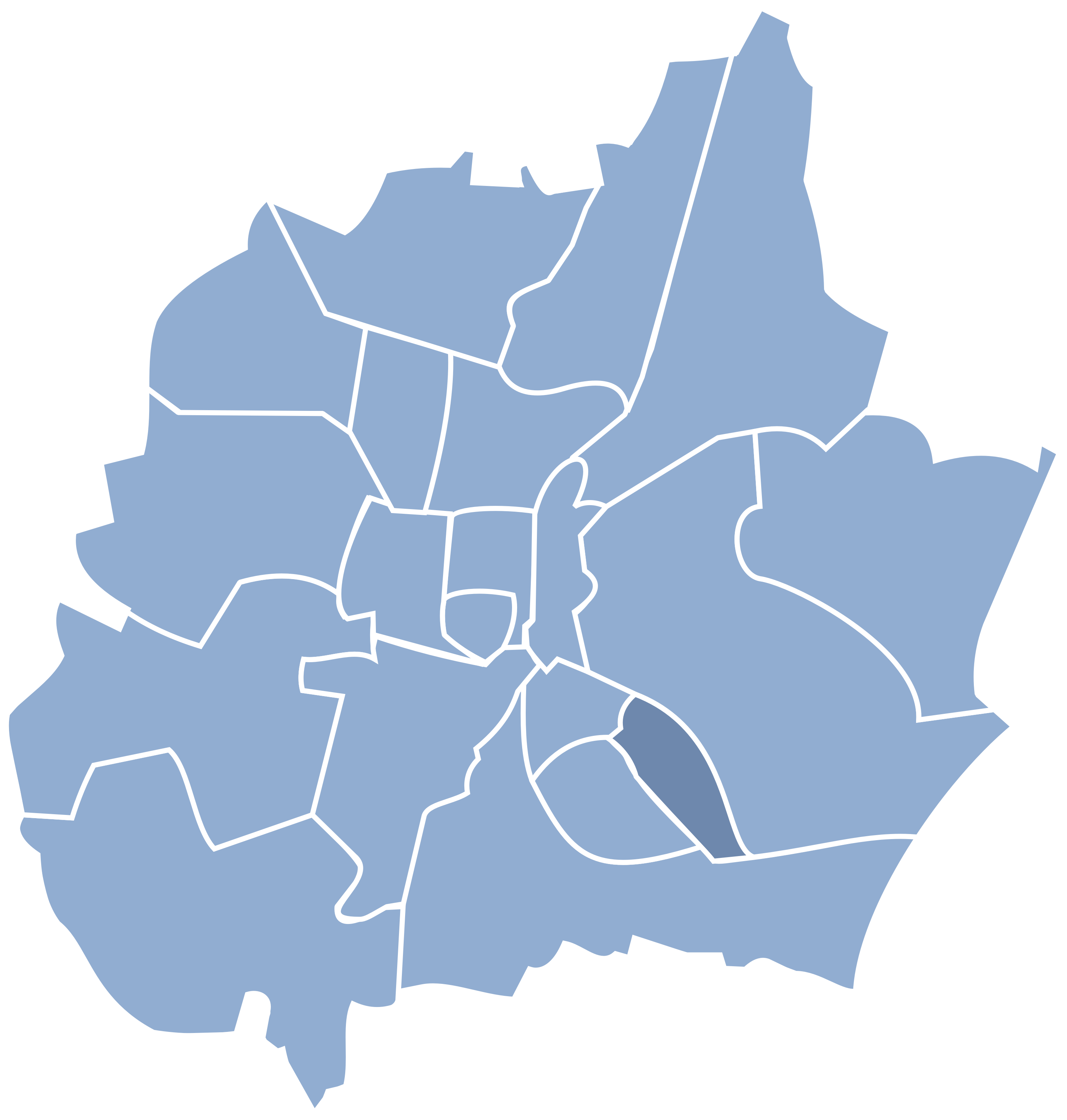
- Location of Raków within Częstochowa
- Coordinates: 50°47′12″N 19°09′00″E
- Country: Poland
- Voivodeship: Silesian
- City county: Częstochowa
- Within city limits: 1928
- Time zone: UTC+1 (CET)
  - Summer (DST): UTC+2 (CEST)
- Vehicle registration: SC

Raków is a dzielnica of Częstochowa, Poland, located in the south-eastern part of the city.

== History ==
A Lusatian culture cemetery from around 750 BC–550 BC is located in Raków and it is now an Archaeological Reserve, a branch of the Częstochowa Museum. It was discovered in 1955.

In 1896–1902, the Huta Częstochowa steelworks were built in Raków. Raków soon evolved into an industrial settlement.

Raków was included within the city limits of Częstochowa as a new district in 1928.

Following the Nazi invasion of Poland, which started World War II in September 1939, Raków was occupied by Germany until 1945. The Nazi's seized the steelworks and handed them over to the HASAG company. The HASAG company operated a forced labour camp for Jewish men. Polish workers aided imprisoned Jews, and in mid-1944, Polish resistance member Jan Brus, who supplied Jews with food and money on behalf of the Żegota Council to Aid Jews, was shot by a German camp guard.

In the 2020s, the local football team Raków Częstochowa became one of the top teams in Poland, winning its first Polish Cup in 2021, and its first Polish football championship in 2023.

== Sights ==
Sights of Raków include:

- Municipal Culture Center
- prehistoric Archaeological Reserve
- Saint Joseph church
- Plac Orląt Lwowskich ("Lwów Eaglets Square") with the Lwów Eaglets Monument and the Saint Melchior Grodziecki church

== Transport ==
The Częstochowa Raków railway station is located in Raków.

== Sport ==
In 1921 the football club KSF Racovia Raków was founded before dissolving in 1925. However, it was refounded as the workers' sports club RKS Raków two years later, and continues to this day as the local football club Raków Częstochowa.
