= Gliwice railway station =

Railway station in Silesia, Poland

Gliwice
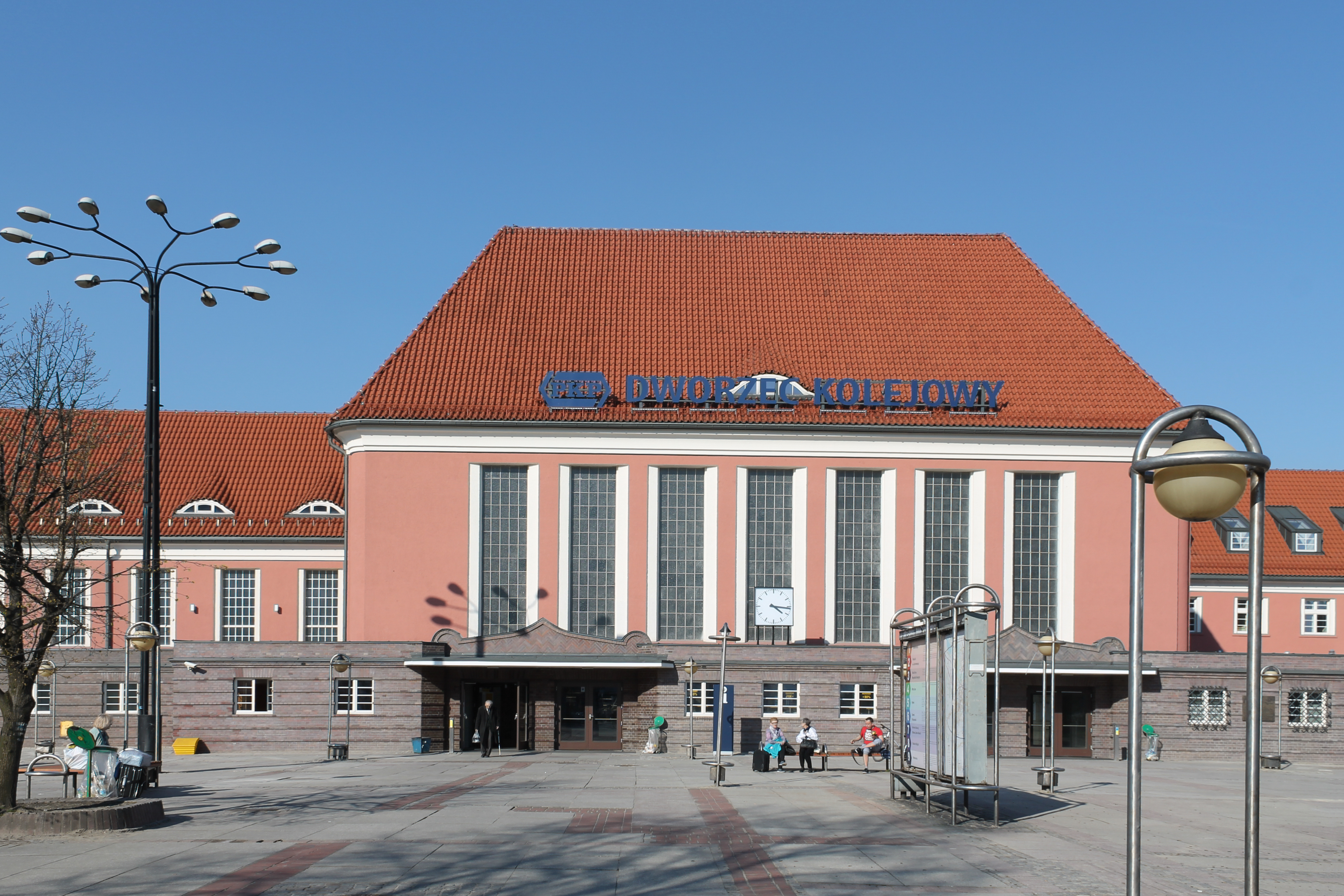

General information
- Location: city centre, Gliwice, Silesian Voivodeship; Poland
- Coordinates: 50°18′04″N 18°40′37″E
- System: A
- Owner: Polskie Koleje Państwowe S.A.
- Platforms: 4

History
- Opened: 1845

Services
Preceding station	PKP Intercity	Following station
Opole Główne towards Berlin Hbf	EuroCity EC 95; IC	Zabrze towards Przemyśl Główny
Zabrze towards Gdynia Główna	EIP	Terminus
Zabrze towards Racibórz	IC	Kędzierzyn-Koźle towards Olsztyn Główny
Strzelce Opolskie towards Szklarska Poręba Górna	TLK via Katowice	Zabrze towards Warszawa Wschodnia
Preceding station	Polregio	Following station
Gliwice Łabędy towards Opole Główne or Wrocław Główny	PR	Terminus
Preceding station	KŚ	Following station
Terminus	S1	Zabrze towards Częstochowa
Terminus	S18	Bytom Terminus
Terminus	S76	Przyszowice towards Wisła Głębce
Location
- Location within Poland Location within Silesian Voivodeship

Gliwice railway station is a junction railway station in the city centre of Gliwice in the Silesian Voivodeship. The railway station in Gliwice is the second largest railway station in the Upper Silesian urban area and is part of the system of rail transport in Gliwice. The station opened on October 2, 1845, with the opening of a rail line from Wrocław. In 2015–2016, the station and its platforms were completely reconstructed. The station is connected to cities abroad via EuroCity services, various cities in Poland via PKP Express Intercity Premium (EIP), Intercity (IC), and Twoje Linie Kolejowe (TLK) services, and various regional cities via Polregio as well as Silesian Railways services.

== Train services ==
The station is served by the following service(s):

- EuroCity services (EC) (EC 95 by DB) (IC by PKP) Berlin - Frankfurt (Oder) - Rzepin - Wrocław – Katowice – Kraków – Rzeszów – Przemyśl
- EuroCity services (EC) (IC by PKP) Berlin - Frankfurt (Oder) - Rzepin - Wrocław – Katowice – Kraków – Rzeszów – Przemyśl
- Express Intercity Premium services (EIP) Gdynia - Warsaw - Katowice - Gliwice
- Intercity services (IC) Kraków Główny — Świnoujście
- Intercity services (IC) Olsztyn - Warszawa - Skierniewice - Częstochowa - Katowice - Gliwice - Racibórz
- Intercity services (TLK) Warszawa - Częstochowa - Katowice - Opole - Wrocław - Szklarska Poręba Górna
- Regional services (R) Opole Główne - Gliwice
- Regional service (PR) Wrocław - Oława - Brzeg - Opole Główne - Gliwice
- Regional services (KŚ) S1 Gliwice – Zabrze - Katowice – Zawiercie - Częstochowa
- Regional services (KŚ) S18 Gliwice – Bytom
- Regional services (KŚ) S76 Gliwice – Knurów – Rybnik – Żory– Chybie – Skoczów – Ustron – Wisła

== See also ==
- Rail transport in Poland
