= Kielce Bus Station =

Bus station in Kielce, Poland

Kielce Bus Station Dworzec autobusowy w Kielcach
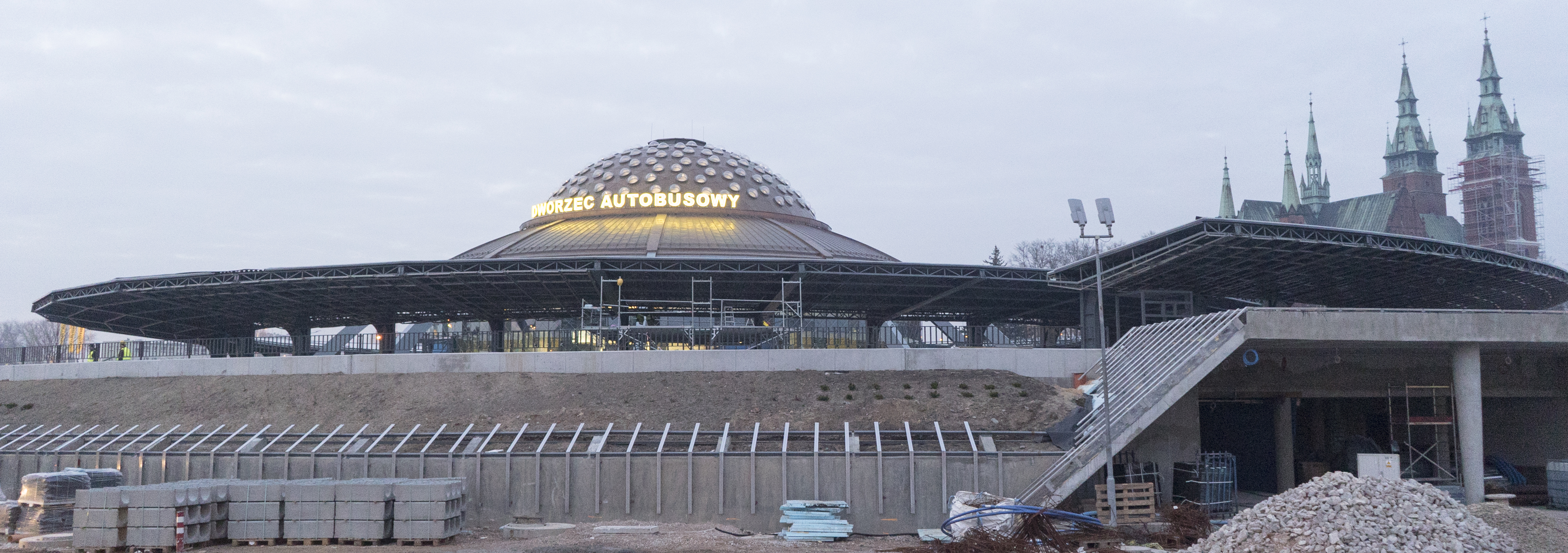
- Kielce Bus Station under reconstruction as of January 2020

General information
- Location: Czarnowska 12; 25-504 Kielce; Poland
- Coordinates: 50°52′32″N 20°37′18″E
- Owner: City of Kielce
- Operator: Zarząd Transportu Miejskiego

Construction
- Architect: Edward Modrzejewski

Other information
- Website: dworzec.kielce.pl

History
- Opened: 20 July 1984
Location
- Location within Poland

Kielce Bus Station (Polish: Dworzec autobusowy w Kielcach) is a bus station in Kielce, Poland. It is a novelty architecture type of a building, shaped to resemble a UFO. Opened in 1984, it was seen as one of the more modern bus stations of its kind in Poland at that particular time.

The station is built upon a large roundabout of 89 meters in diameter providing room for 15 platforms each of 18 meters length (the largest legal length of a bus in Poland and most of Europe). An additional island increases the number of platforms by 3, also providing night-time operation when the main building is closed. The main building of circular shape with a dome is located in the center of the roundabout. It is accessed by two tunnels beneath the roundabout - this feature provides maximum safety as pedestrian and bus traffic never cross each other.

== History ==
The building was constructed from 1975 to 1984, and opened on 20 July that year, two days before the 40th anniversary of the establishment of the People's Republic of Poland. It was designed by Polish architect Edward Modrzejewski. The facility was seen as highly advanced in terms of its overall capacity, and quickly became a minor tourist attraction and one of the landmarks of Kielce. It was designed to accommodate 1,500 buses and the projected number of 24,000 passengers daily. The size of the complex is about 4 hectares (9.9 acres).

Recently the local government has declared the building to be a monument, and the Świętokrzyskie Voivodeship monument curator has justified this decision by describing the building as "unique and novel example of People's Republic of Poland-era type of architecture" and "one of the most valuable architectural designs of the years of 1970s and 1980s in Poland, and a material document of this period".

The fortunes of the building decreased in the 1990s, as post-communist Poland saw a rise in private car ownership, and a decreased interest in public transit. The building, formerly owned by the PKS company, has been privatized in the early 2010s. While the government authorities were interested in preserving the building, seen as an important landmark, its private owners were struggling to turn a profit out of it. As of the 21st century, the building became increasingly in need of renovation, and the owner, the PKS 2 company, was planning to replace it with a new construction at a different location, with the original building being heavily modified or replaced. A spokesman for the company has even declared that they are not willing to invest in renovating the building, and in fact are waiting for the building to collapse. This has caused criticism from individuals who see the building as part of modern Poland's cultural heritage, and demand that the design is not significantly altered.

The city bought back the bus station at the end of March 2016. In September 2018, a major reconstruction project was started with the goal of almost completely rebuilding the station, but preserving the basic design and the distinctive shape of the building. The works are scheduled to finish in June 2020, with a planned cost of 68,7 million PLN, 9 million of which is to be provided by the city government (with the bulk of the rest of the funding coming from the European Union).

== Gallery ==
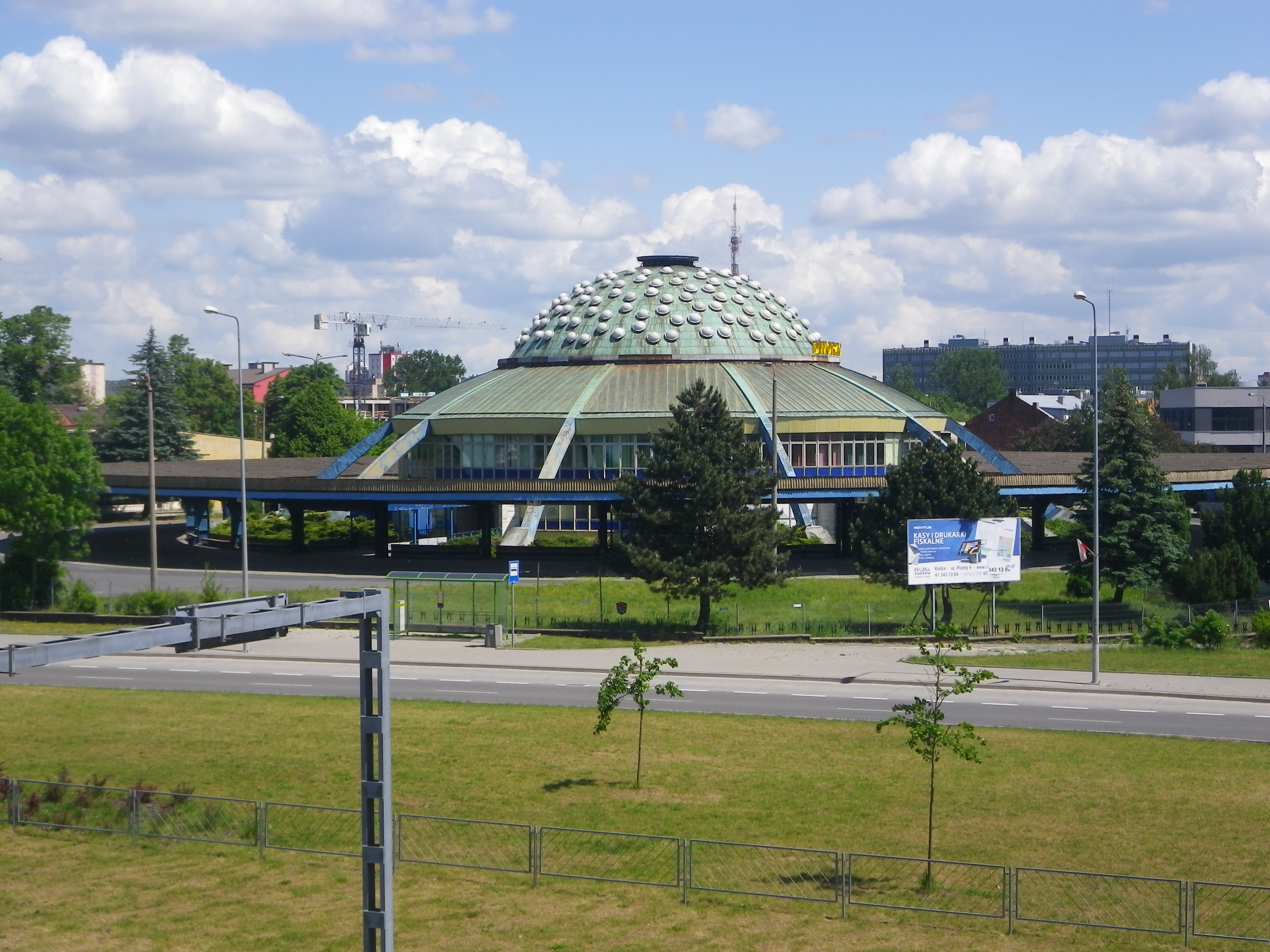
The station before the reconstruction began in 2018

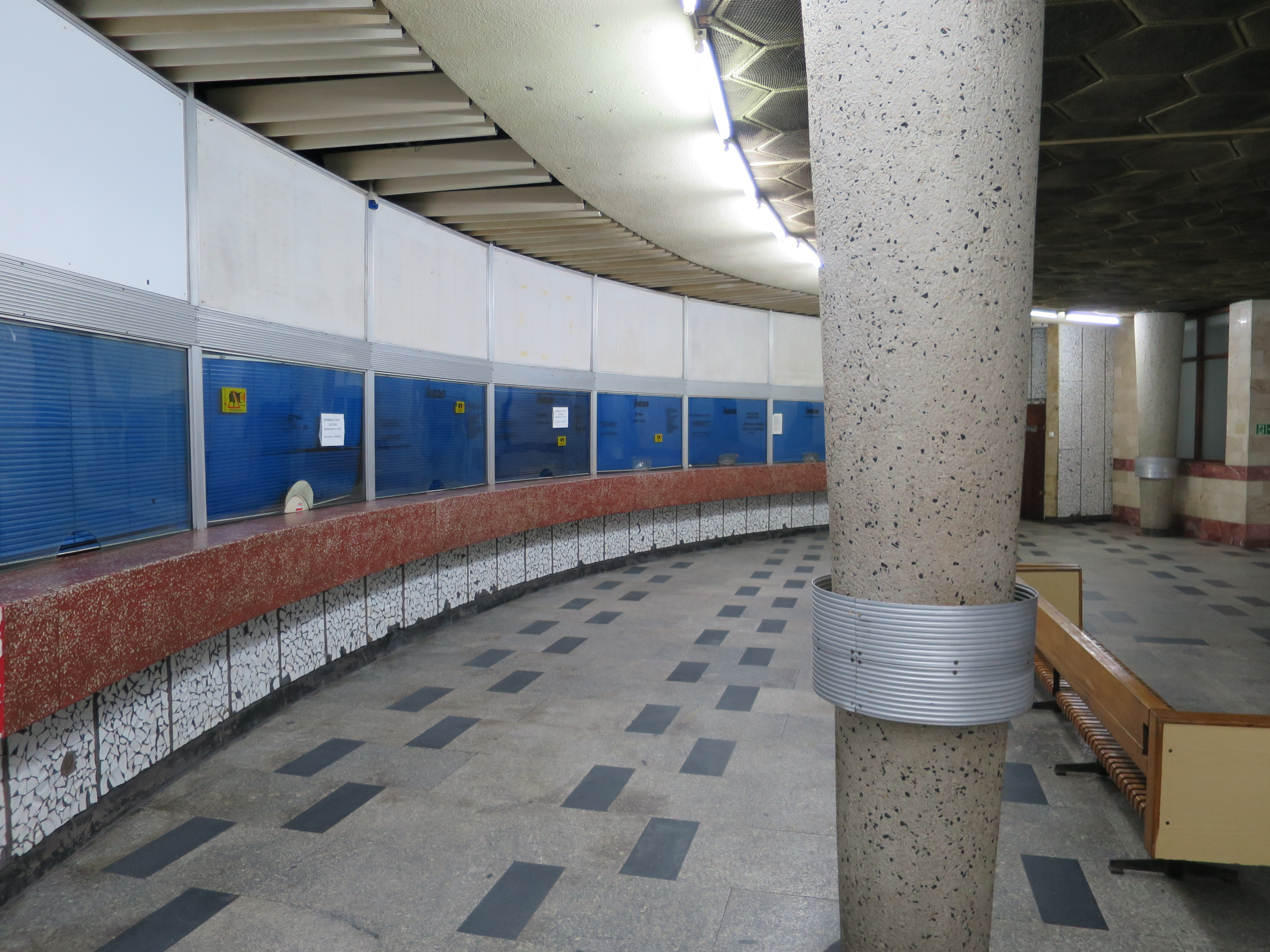
Interior of the old station

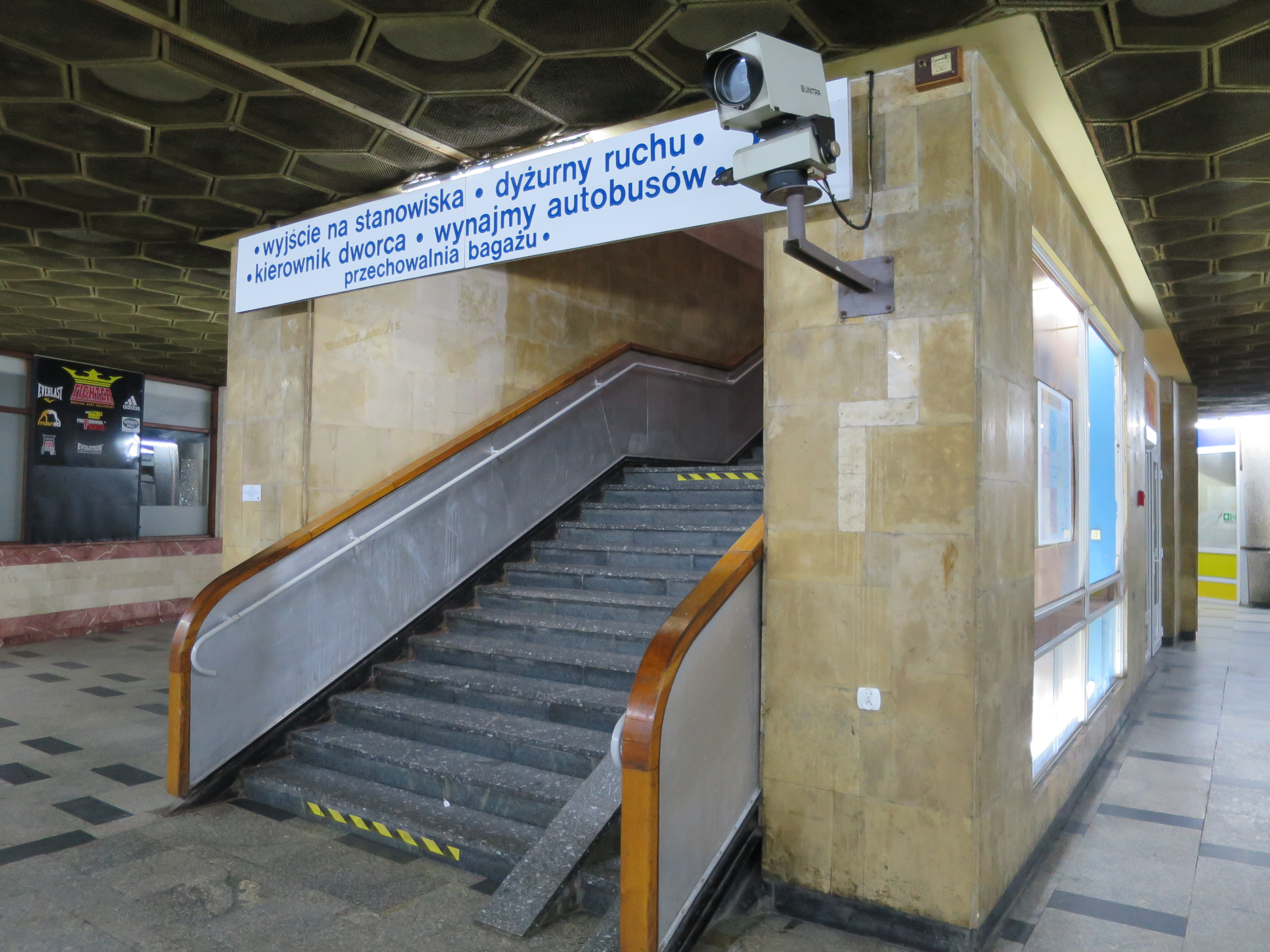
Stairs leading to the main hall

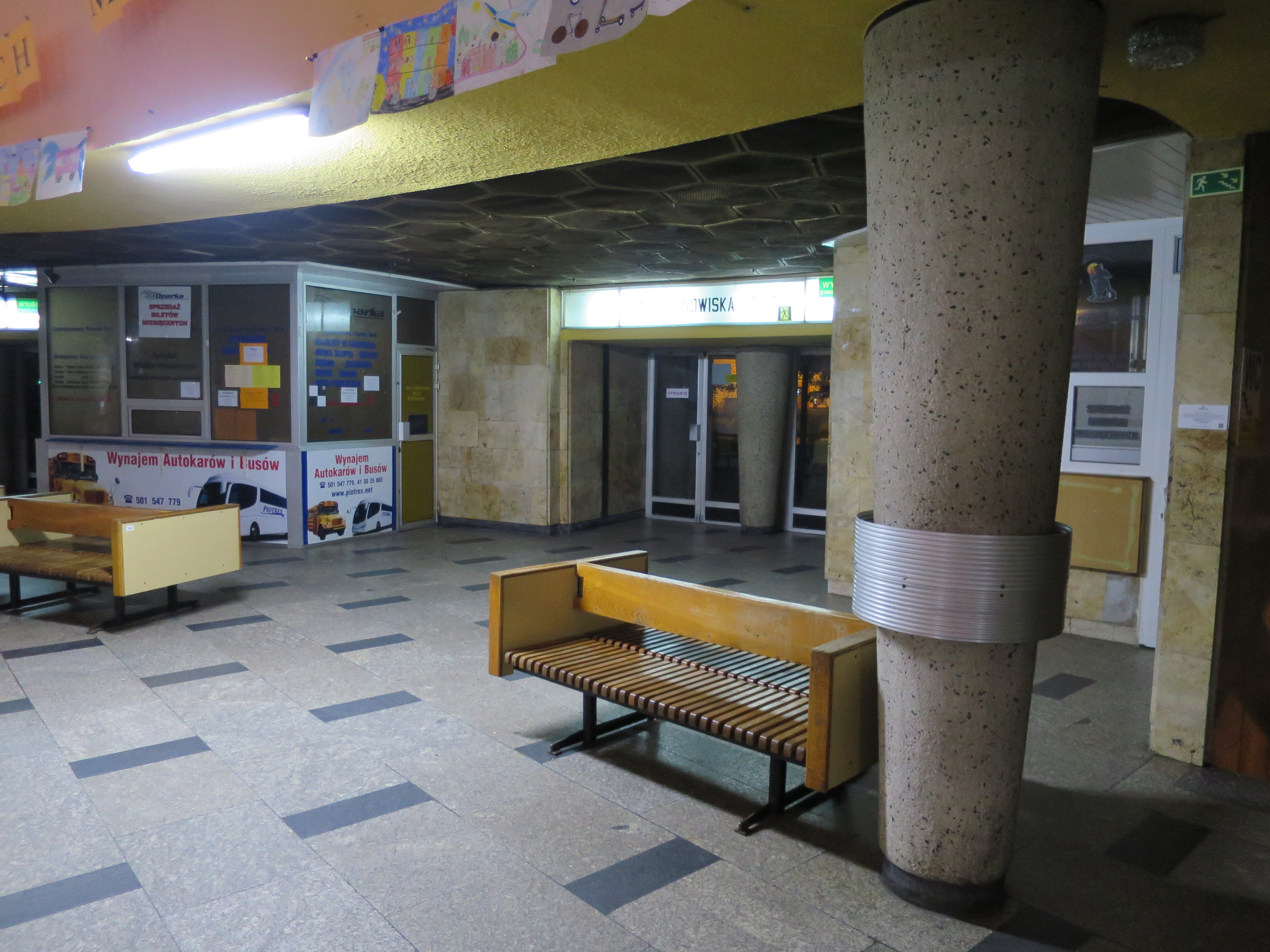
The main hall

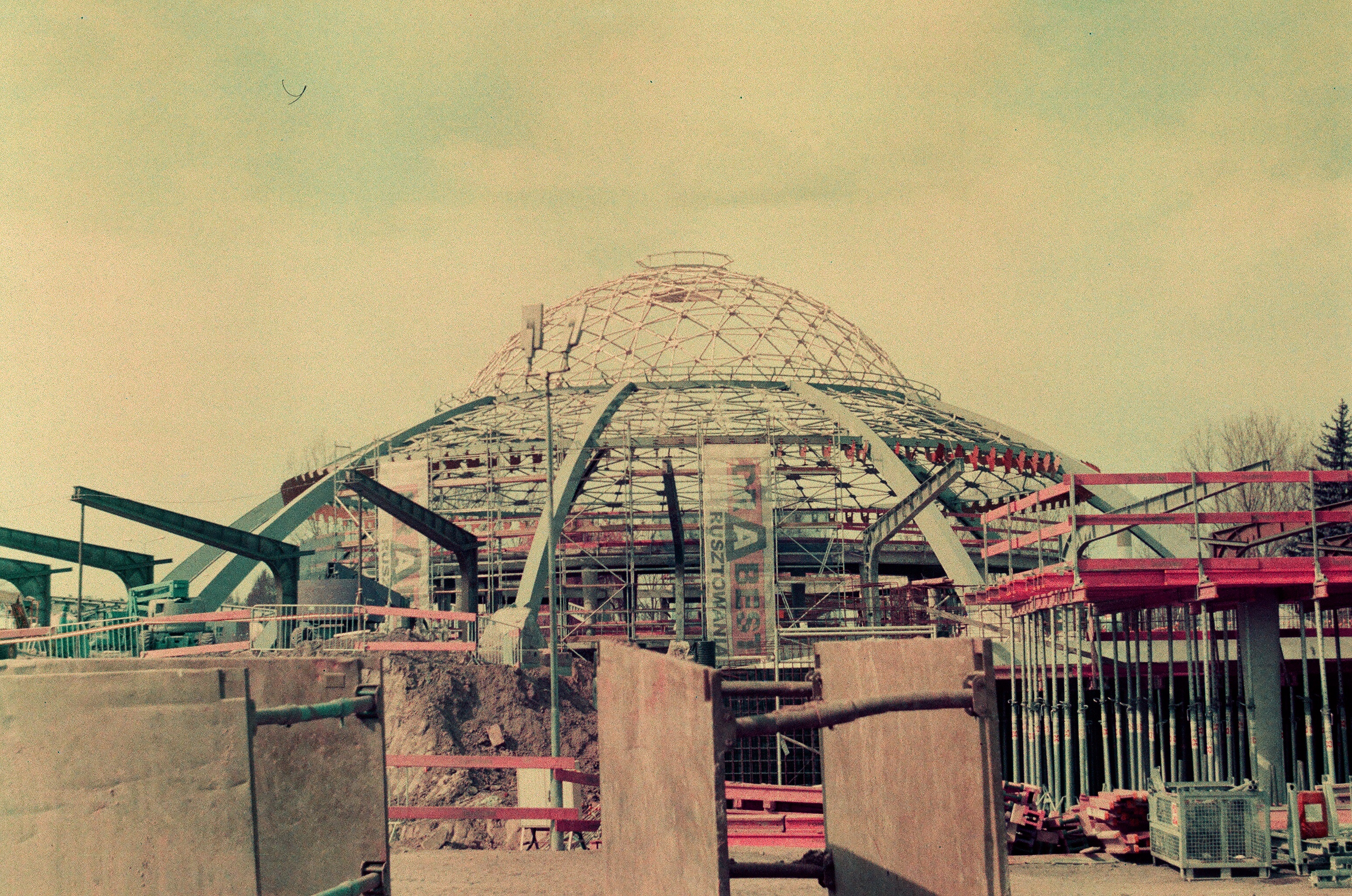
The reconstruction of the station in 2019

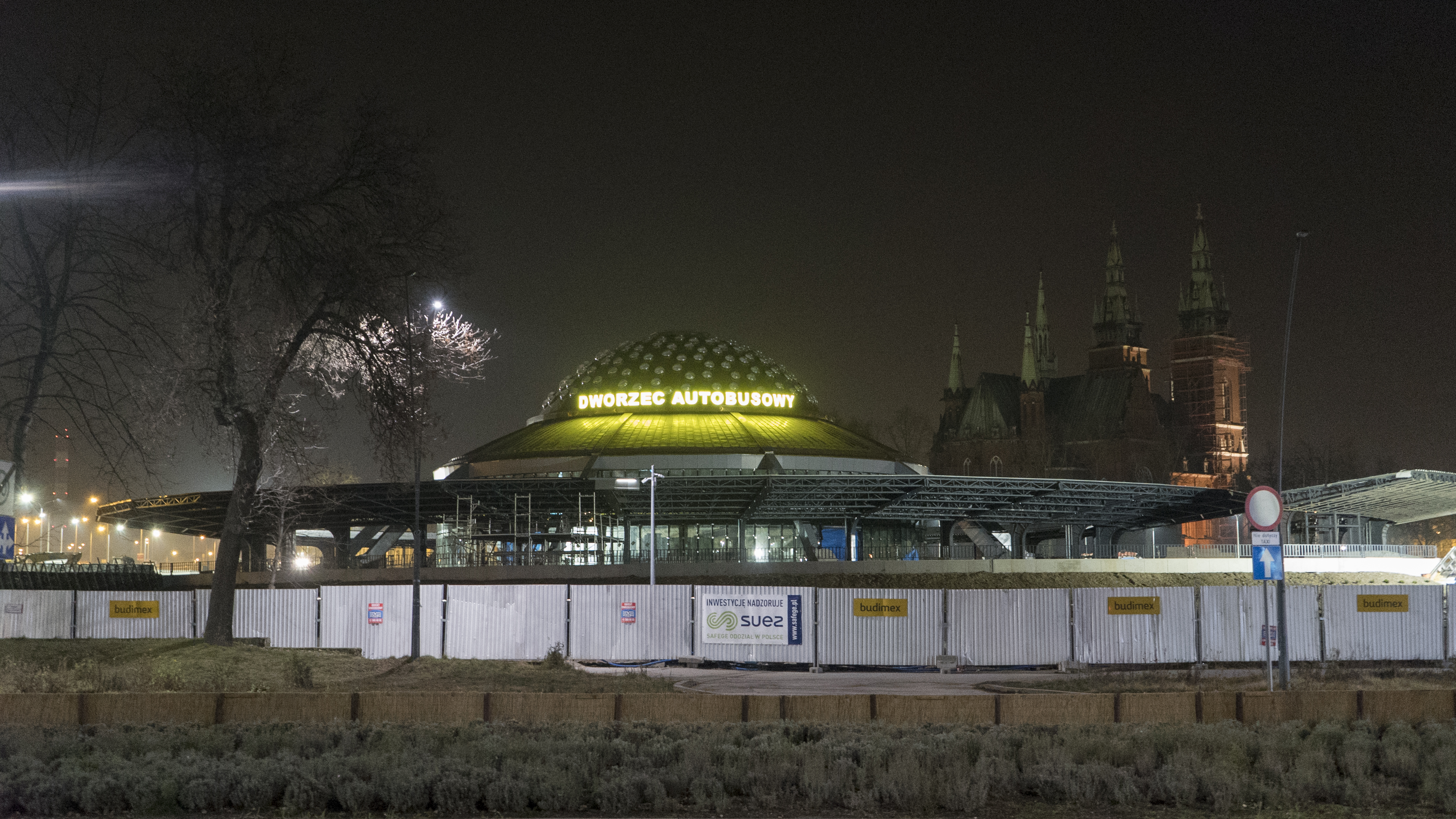
Bus station at night in January 2020

== See also ==
- Annunciation Greek Orthodox Church, similar shaped Frank Lloyd Wright building
- Spodek
