= Częstochowa Stradom railway station =

Railway station in Silesia, Poland

Częstochowa Stradom
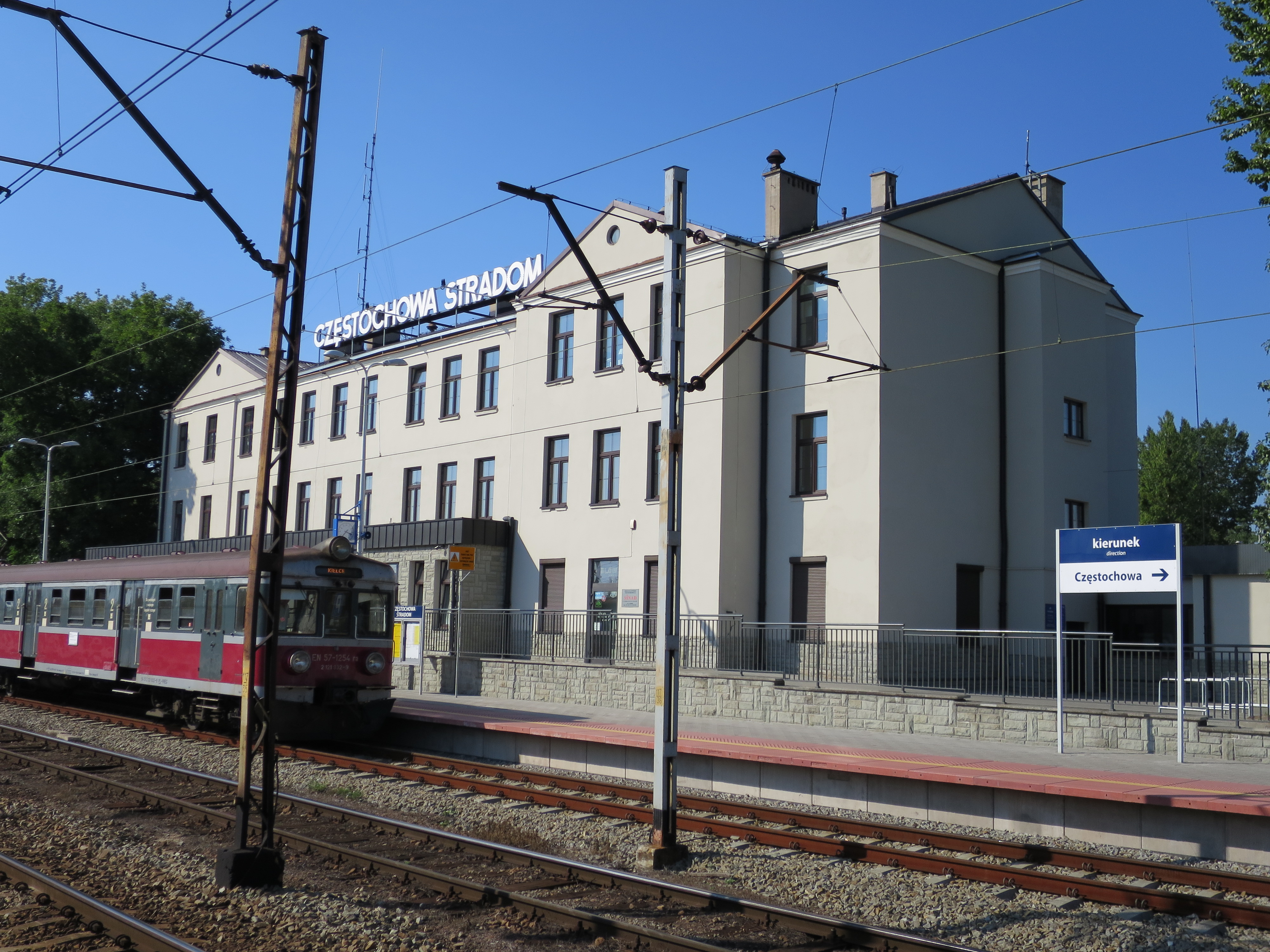

General information
- Location: Częstochowa, Silesia; Poland
- Coordinates: 50.7976414°N 19.1051466°E
- Owner: Polskie Koleje Państwowe S.A.
- Lines: 61: Kielce – Fosowskie; 700: Częstochowa Stradom – Częstochowa; 702: Częstochowa Stradom – Częstochowa Towarowa
- Platforms: 2
- Tracks: 3

Construction
- Structure type: Building: Yes

History
- Opened: 1911
- Former names: Stradom, Tschenstochau Stradom
Location

Częstochowa Stradom railway station is one of two major railway stations in Częstochowa, Silesian Voivodeship, Poland, the other station being the Częstochowa railway station. As of 2022, it is served by Polregio (local and InterRegio services) and PKP Intercity (EIP, InterCity, and TLK services).

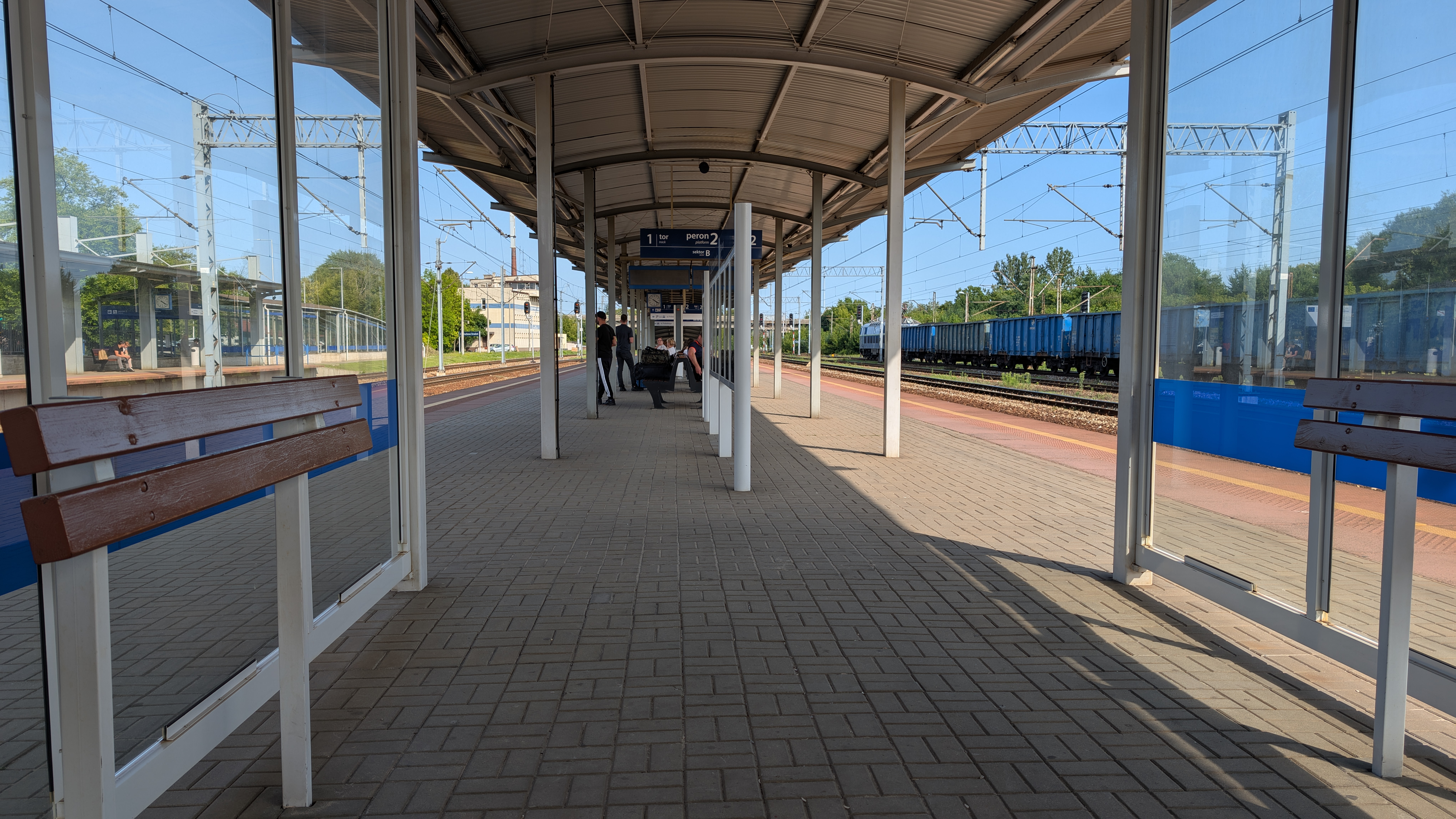
Platforms in August 2026

== Train services ==
The station is served by the following services:

- Express Intercity Premium services (EIP) Warsaw - Wrocław
- Express Intercity services (EIC) Warsaw - Wrocław
- Intercity services (IC) Warszawa - Częstochowa - Opole - Wrocław
- Intercity services (IC) Białystok - Warszawa - Częstochowa - Opole - Wrocław
- Intercity services (IC) Poznań - Ostrów Wielkopolski - Kępno - Lubliniec - Częstochowa - Kraków
- Intercity services (IC) Zielona Góra - Wrocław - Opele - Częstochowa - Kraków - Rzeszów - Przemyśl
- Intercity services (TLK) Warszawa - Częstochowa - Lubliniec - Opole - Wrocław - Szklarska Poręba Górna
- Intercity services (TLK) Poznań - Ostrów Wielkopolski - Kępno - Lubliniec - Częstochowa - Kraków
- Intercity services (TLK) Lublin Główny — Świnoujście
- Regional Service (PR) Częstochowa – Lubliniec
- Regional Service (PR) Częstochowa – Lubliniec - Kluckzbork - Namysłów
- Regional Service (KŚ) S13 Częstochowa – Lubliniec

Preceding station	PKP Intercity	Following station
Warszawa Zachodnia towards Warszawa Wschodnia	EIP	Lubliniec towards Wrocław Główny
Warszawa Zachodnia towards Warszawa Wschodnia	EIC	Lubliniec towards Wrocław Główny
Częstochowa towards Warszawa Gdańska or Warszawa Wschodnia	IC Via Częstochowa	Lubliniec towards Wrocław Główny
Częstochowa towards Białystok	IC Via Częstochowa	Lubliniec towards Wrocław Główny
Myszków towards Kraków Główny	IC	Lubliniec towards Poznań Główny
Lubliniec towards Zielona Góra Główna	IC	Miechów towards Przemyśl Główny
Lubliniec towards Szklarska Poręba Górna	TLK via Lubliniec	Częstochowa towards Warszawa Gdańska
Myszków towards Kraków Główny	TLK	Lubliniec towards Poznań Główny
Lubliniec towards Świnoujście	TLK	Koniecpol towards Lublin Główny
Preceding station	Polregio	Following station
Częstochowa Gnaszyn towards Lubliniec or Namysłów	PR	Częstochowa Terminus
Preceding station	KŚ	Following station
Częstochowa Gnaszyn towards Lubliniec	S13	Częstochowa Terminus
