= Bytom railway station =

Railway station in Bytom, Poland

Bytom
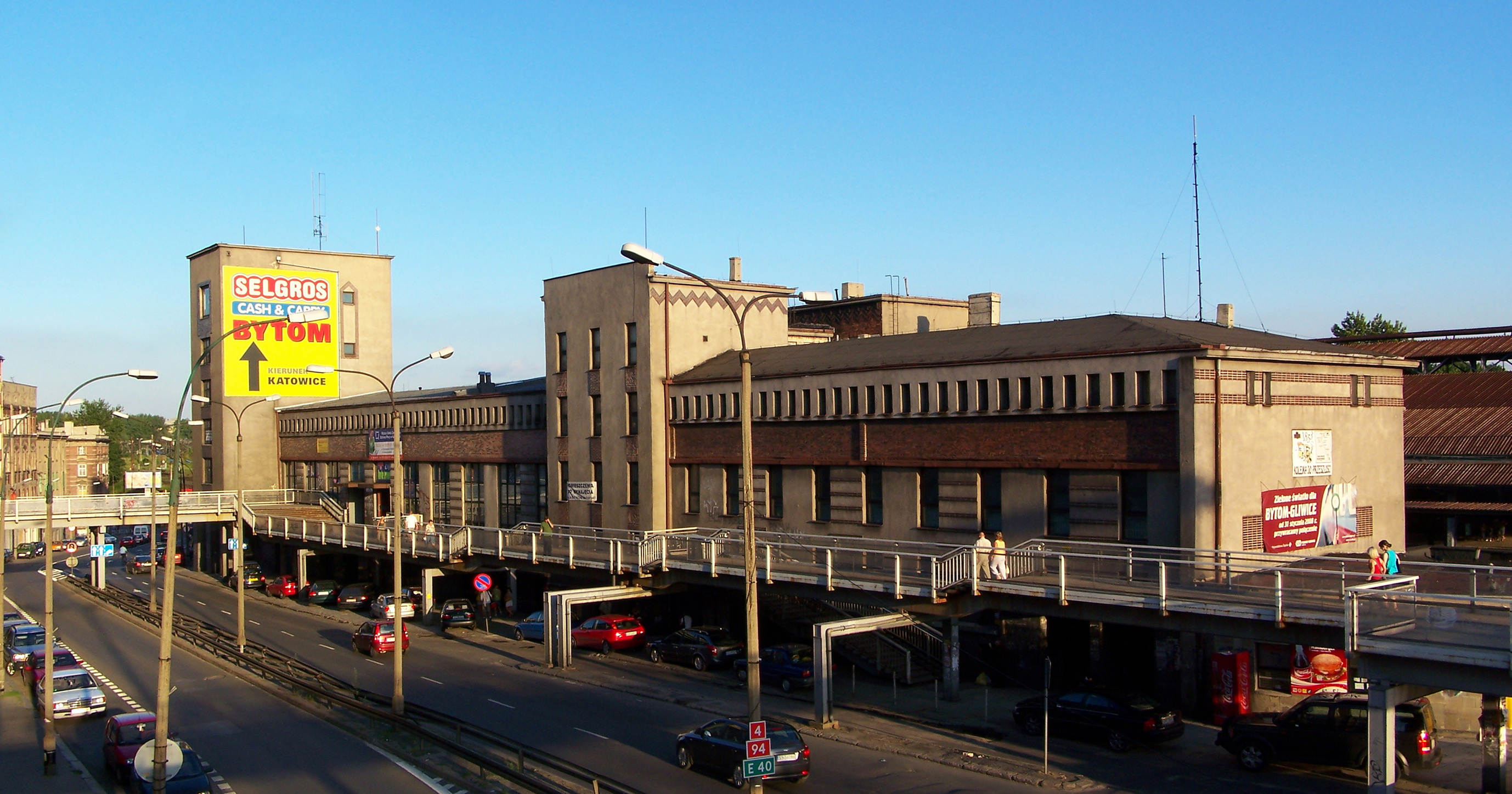

General information
- Location: Bytom, Silesian Voivodeship; Poland
- Coordinates: 50.2036°N 18.5454°E
- Owner: Polskie Koleje Państwowe S.A.
- Platforms: 3
- Tracks: 6

History
- Opened: 1868; 1929
- Former names: Beuthen, Beuthen O/Schl. Hbf.

Services
Preceding station	KŚ	Following station
Bytom Karb towards Lubliniec	S8	Chorzów Stary towards Katowice
Gliwice Terminus	S18	Terminus
Location
- Location within Poland

Bytom railway station is a station in Bytom, Silesian Voivodeship, Poland. It is the main railway station for Bytom, located by Wolski Square. One of the few in Poland with a platform hall.

== History ==
The modern-day building is located on the grounds of Bytom's former, historic railway station, built in 1868. The former railway station was built together with the construction of the Tarnowskie Góry - Katowice - Czechowice-Dziedzice. After World War I, and the division of Silesia, the station's significance increased. In 1929–30, the two oldest buildings from 1872 and 1900 were demolished, and replaced by a new railway station building with a platform hall, in the place of the former round engine house from 1872 and a depot for the transit of cargo from wagons on narrow-gauge railway and normal track gauge. Platforms 2,3 and 4 operated German routes, whilst platform 1 operated Polish routes.

The railway station remains in its modernist architectural form.

== Connections ==
- 131 Chorzów Batory - Tczew
- 132 Bytom - Wrocław Główny
- 710 Bytom - Bytom Borek
