= Lubliniec railway station =

Railway station in Silesia, Poland

Lubliniec
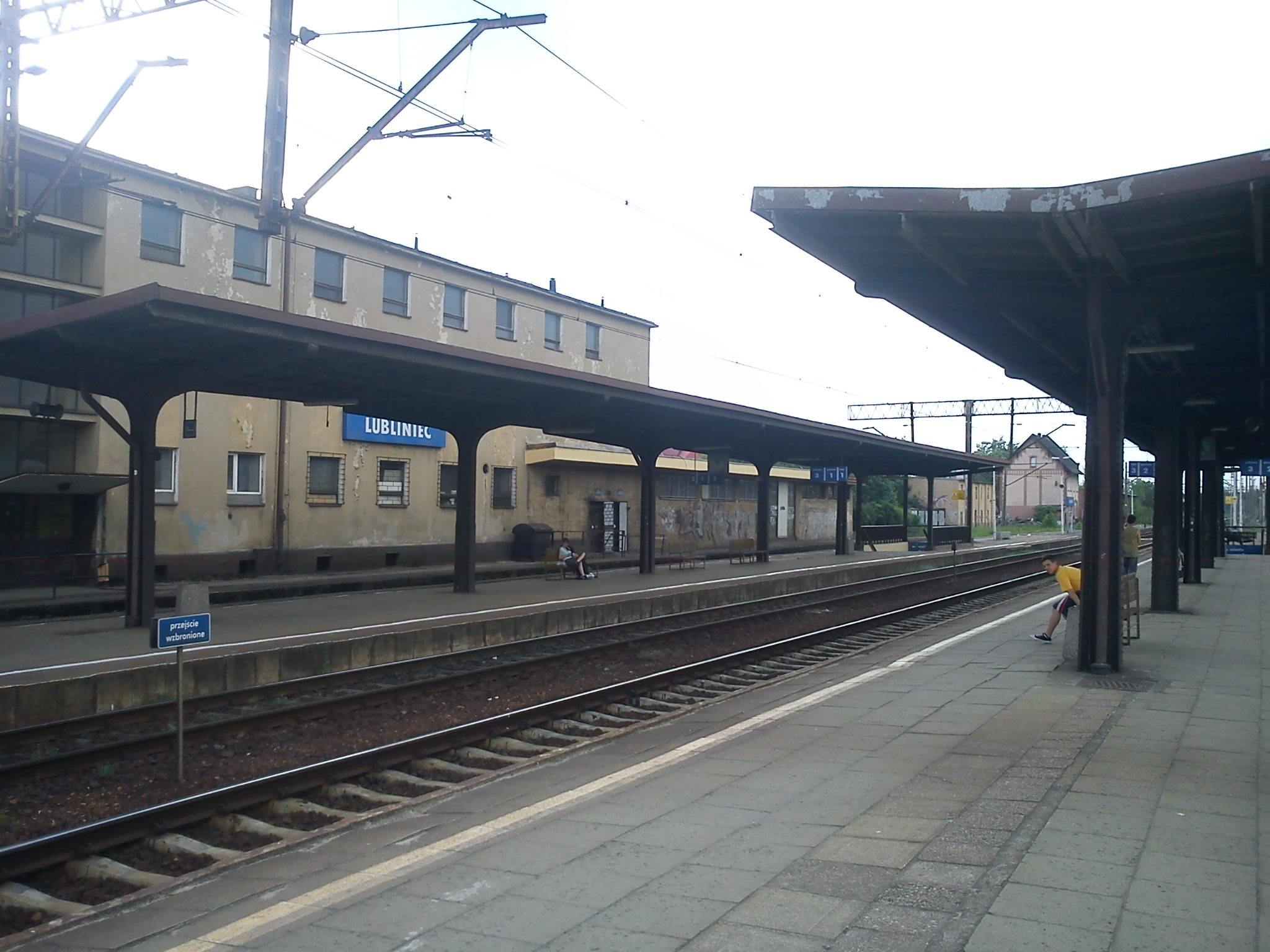

General information
- Location: Lubliniec, Silesia; Poland
- Coordinates: 50.6730451°N 18.687695°E
- Owner: Polskie Koleje Państwowe S.A.
- Line: 61: Kielce – Fosowskie; 143: Kalety – Wrocław Popowice WP2; 152: Pyskowice – Lubliniec
- Platforms: 2
- Tracks: 4

Construction
- Structure type: Building: Yes

History
- Former names: Lublinitz Hbf; Loben
Location

Lubliniec railway station is a railway station in Lubliniec, Silesian Voivodeship, Poland. As of 2022, it is served by Polregio (local and InterRegio services) and PKP Intercity (EIP, InterCity, and TLK services).

== Train services ==
The station is served by the following services:

- Express Intercity Premium services (EIP) Warsaw - Wrocław
- Express Intercity services (EIC) Warsaw - Wrocław
- Intercity services (IC) Warszawa - Częstochowa - Opole - Wrocław
- Intercity services (IC) Białystok - Warszawa - Częstochowa - Opole - Wrocław
- Intercity services (TLK) Warszawa - Częstochowa - Lubliniec - Opole - Wrocław - Szklarska Poręba Górna
- Regional Service (PR) Częstochowa – Lubliniec
- Regional Service (PR) Częstochowa – Lubliniec - Kluczbork - Namysłów
- Regional Service (PR) Wrocław - Oleśnica - Kluczbork - Lubliniec
- Regional Service (PR) Lubliniec - Tarnowskie Góry
- Regional Service (KŚ) S8 Lubliniec - Tarnowskie Góry - Bytom - Katowice
- Regional Service (KŚ) S13 Częstochowa – Lubliniec

Preceding station	PKP Intercity	Following station
Częstochowa Stradom towards Warszawa Wschodnia	EIP	Opole Główne towards Wrocław Główny
Częstochowa Stradom towards Warszawa Wschodnia	EIC	Opole Główne towards Wrocław Główny
Częstochowa Stradom towards Warszawa Gdańska or Warszawa Wschodnia	IC Via Częstochowa	Ozimek towards Wrocław Główny
Częstochowa Stradom towards Białystok	IC Via Częstochowa	Opole Główne towards Wrocław Główny
Opole Główne towards Szklarska Poręba Górna	TLK via Lubliniec	Częstochowa Stradom towards Warszawa Wschodnia
Preceding station	Polregio	Following station
Terminus	PR	Kochanowice towards Częstochowa
Kochcice-Glinica towards Namysłów	PR	Kochanowice towards Częstochowa
Kochcice-Glinica towards Wrocław Główny	PR	Terminus
Terminus	PR	Kochanowice towards Tarnowskie Góry
Preceding station	KŚ	Following station
Terminus	S8	Rusinowice towards Katowice
Terminus	S13	Kochanowice towards Częstochowa
