= Częstochowa railway station =

Railway station in Częstochowa, Poland

Częstochowa
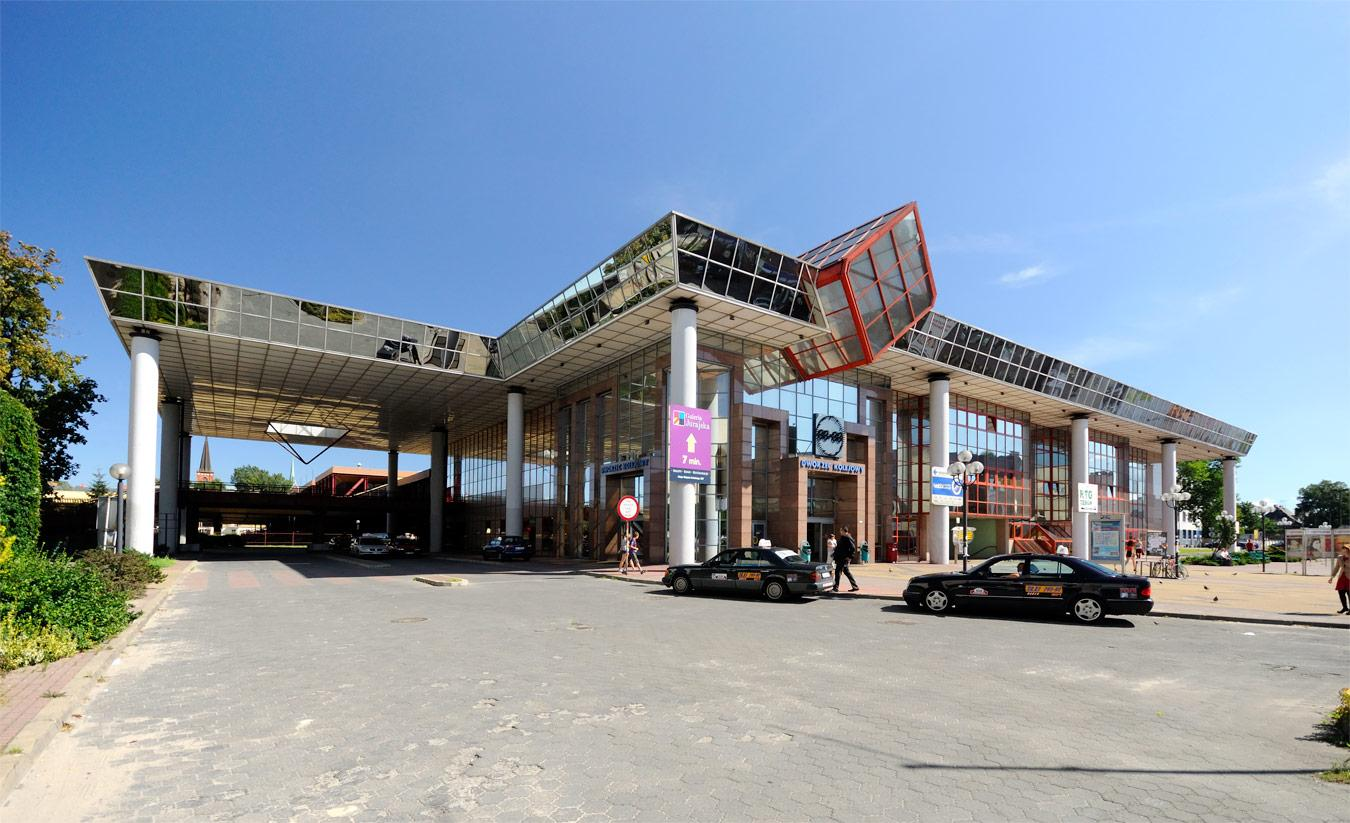
- Station building in 2011, prior to its demolition

General information
- Location: Częstochowa, Silesian Voivodeship; Poland
- Coordinates: 50.808728°N 19.119292°E
- Owner: Polish State Railways
- Platforms: 4
- Tracks: 8

History
- Opened: 1846; 180 years ago
- Former names: Tschenstochau, Częstochowa (Osobowa), Częstochowa Osobowa
Location
- Location within Poland Location within Silesian Voivodeship

Częstochowa is one of two major railway stations in Częstochowa, Silesian Voivodeship, Poland, the other station being Częstochowa Stradom. In 2018, the station served approximately 10,000 passengers a day.

== History ==
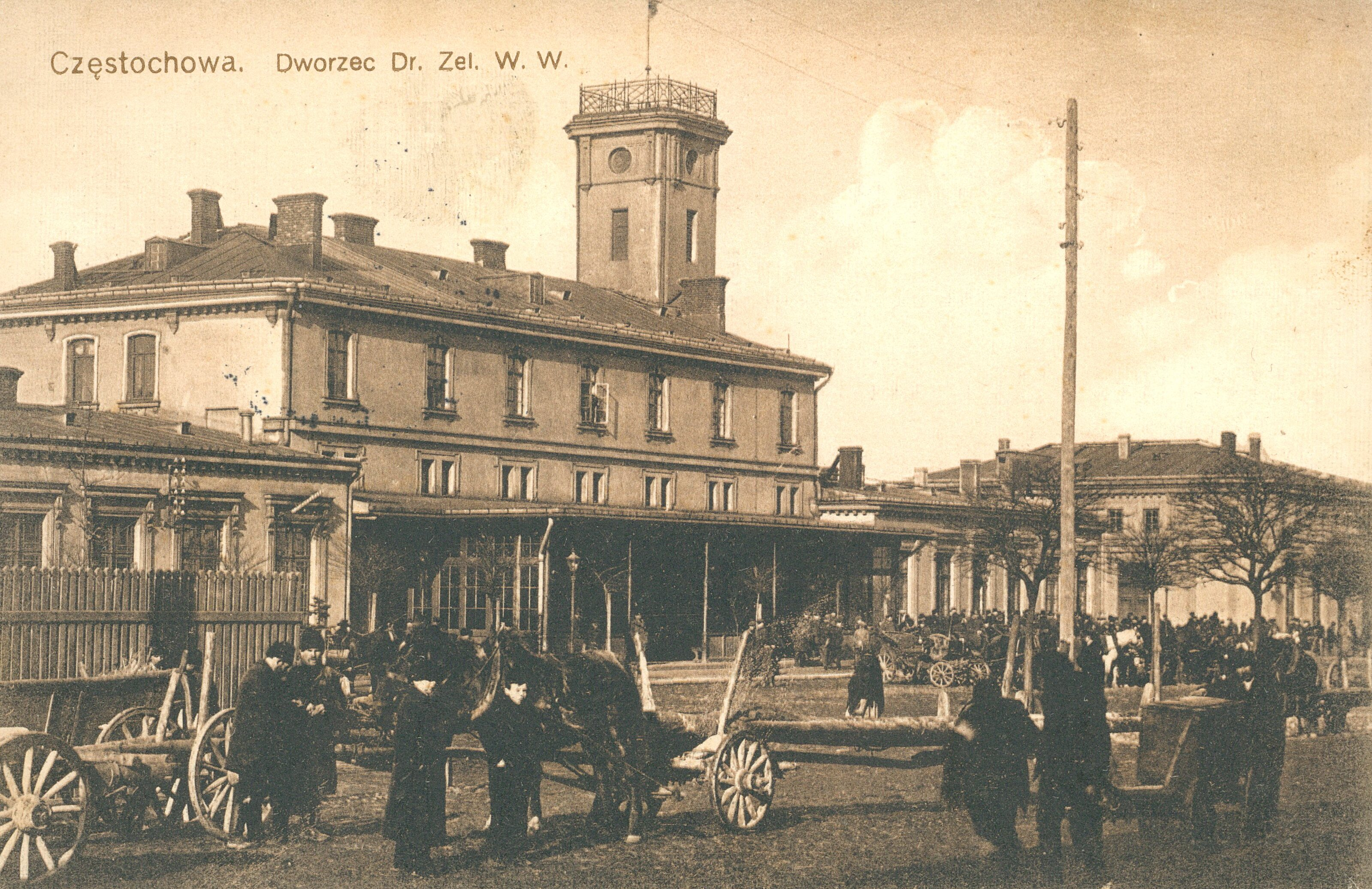
Original station of the Warsaw–Vienna railway in 1918

The first station was built in the years 1845–1846, during the construction of the Warsaw–Vienna railway. In 1873 the station was expanded and then extended by architect Czesław Domaniewski. The original building was torn down in the 1970s to make place for a larger complex.

Work on the current postmodern architectural style station building designed by architect Ryszard Frankowicz, began in 1989. The first stage consisting of an overpass connecting the station platforms was opened in 1991, in time for the 6th World Youth Day whose central events took place in the Jasna Góra Monastery in Częstochowa. Construction of the stations main building started in 1994 and on November 9, 1996, on the 150th anniversary of the railroad reaching Częstochowa the entire complex was finished. It was officially opened by the then President of Poland, Aleksander Kwaśniewski. On May 24, 1997, a monument with the bust of Władysław Biegański was unveiled in front of the station.

According to the Gazeta Wyborcza ranking of 2008, Częstochowa railway station was considered the third most beautiful station in Poland, behind Białystok railway station and Lublin railway station.

In 2025, the demolition of the 1989 station building began, in preparation for the construction of a new station building and complex. The new station building will feature commercial spaces, an interchange hub for buses, and will be accessible meeting EU standards.

== Train services ==
The station is served by the following service(s):

- Intercity services (IC) Warszawa - Częstochowa - Opole - Wrocław
- Intercity services (IC) Białystok - Warszawa - Częstochowa - Opole - Wrocław
- Intercity services (IC) Gdynia - Gdańsk - Bydgoszcz - Toruń - Kutno - Łódź - Częstochowa - Katowice - Bielsko-Biała
- Intercity services (IC) Łódź Fabryczna — Częstochowa — Kraków Główny
- Intercity services (IC) Warszawa - Częstochowa - Katowice - Bielsko-Biała
- Intercity services (IC) Białystok - Warszawa - Częstochowa - Katowice - Bielsko-Biała
- Intercity services (IC) Olsztyn - Warszawa - Skierniewice - Częstochowa - Katowice - Bielsko-Biała
- Intercity services (IC) Olsztyn - Warszawa - Skierniewice - Częstochowa - Katowice - Gliwice - Racibórz
- Intercity services (TLK) Warszawa - Częstochowa - Lubliniec - Opole - Wrocław - Szklarska Poręba Górna
- Intercity services (TLK) Warszawa - Częstochowa - Katowice - Opole - Wrocław - Szklarska Poręba Górna
- Intercity services (TLK) Gdynia Główna — (via Częstochowa) — Zakopane
- Regional services (PR) Radomsko - Częstochowa
- Regional services (PR) Piotrków Trybunalski - Radomsko - Częstochowa
- Regional services (PR) Łódź Fabryczna - Piotrków Trybunalski - Radomsko - Częstochowa
- Regional services (PR) Łódź Kaliska - Piotrków Trybunalski - Radomsko - Częstochowa
- Regional Service (PR) Częstochowa - Lubliniec
- Regional Service (PR) Częstochowa – Lubliniec - Kluckzbork - Namysłów
- Regional services (PR) Częstochowa - Włoszczowa
- Regional services (PR) Częstochowa - Włoszczowa - Kielce
- Regional services (PR) Częstochowa - Włoszczowa - Kielce - Busko-Zdrój

- Regional Service (KŚ) S1 Gliwice – Zabrze - Katowice – Zawiercie - Częstochowa
- Regional Service (KŚ) S13 Częstochowa – Lubliniec
- Regional services (KŚ) S41 Tychy Lodowisko - Katowice - Sosnowiec Główny - Dąbrowa Górnicza Ząbkowice - Zawiercie

Preceding station	PKP Intercity	Following station
Radomsko towards Warszawa Gdańska or Warszawa Wschodnia	IC Via Częstochowa	Częstochowa Stradom towards Wrocław Główny
Radomsko towards Białystok	IC Via Częstochowa	Częstochowa Stradom towards Wrocław Główny
Koniecpol towards Kraków Główny	IC Via Częstochowa	Radomsko towards Łódź Fabryczna
Radomsko towards Warszawa Wschodnia, Białystok, or Gdynia Główna	IC	Myszków towards Bielsko-Biała Główna
Myszków towards Bielsko-Biała Główna or Racibórz	IC	Radomsko towards Olsztyn Główny
Częstochowa Stradom towards Szklarska Poręba Górna	TLK via Lubliniec	Radomsko towards Warszawa Wschodnia
Zawiercie towards Szklarska Poręba Górna	TLK via Katowice	Grodzisk Mazowiecki towards Warszawa Wschodnia
Radomsko towards Gdynia Główna	TLK via Częstochowa	Koniecpol towards Zakopane
Preceding station	Polregio	Following station
Częstochowa Aniołów towards Radomsko, Piotrków Trybunalski, Łódź Fabryczna or Łódź Kaliska	PR	Terminus
Częstochowa Stradom towards Lubliniec or Namysłów	PR	Terminus
Terminus	PR	Częstochowa Raków towards Włoszczowa, Kielce or Busko-Zdrój
Preceding station	KŚ	Following station
Częstochowa Raków towards Gliwice	S1	Terminus
Częstochowa Stradom towards Lubliniec	S13	Terminus
Częstochowa Raków towards Tychy Lodowisko	S41	Terminus
