= PKP class SM02 =

Polish diesel mechanical shunter locomotive series

SM02/Ls40
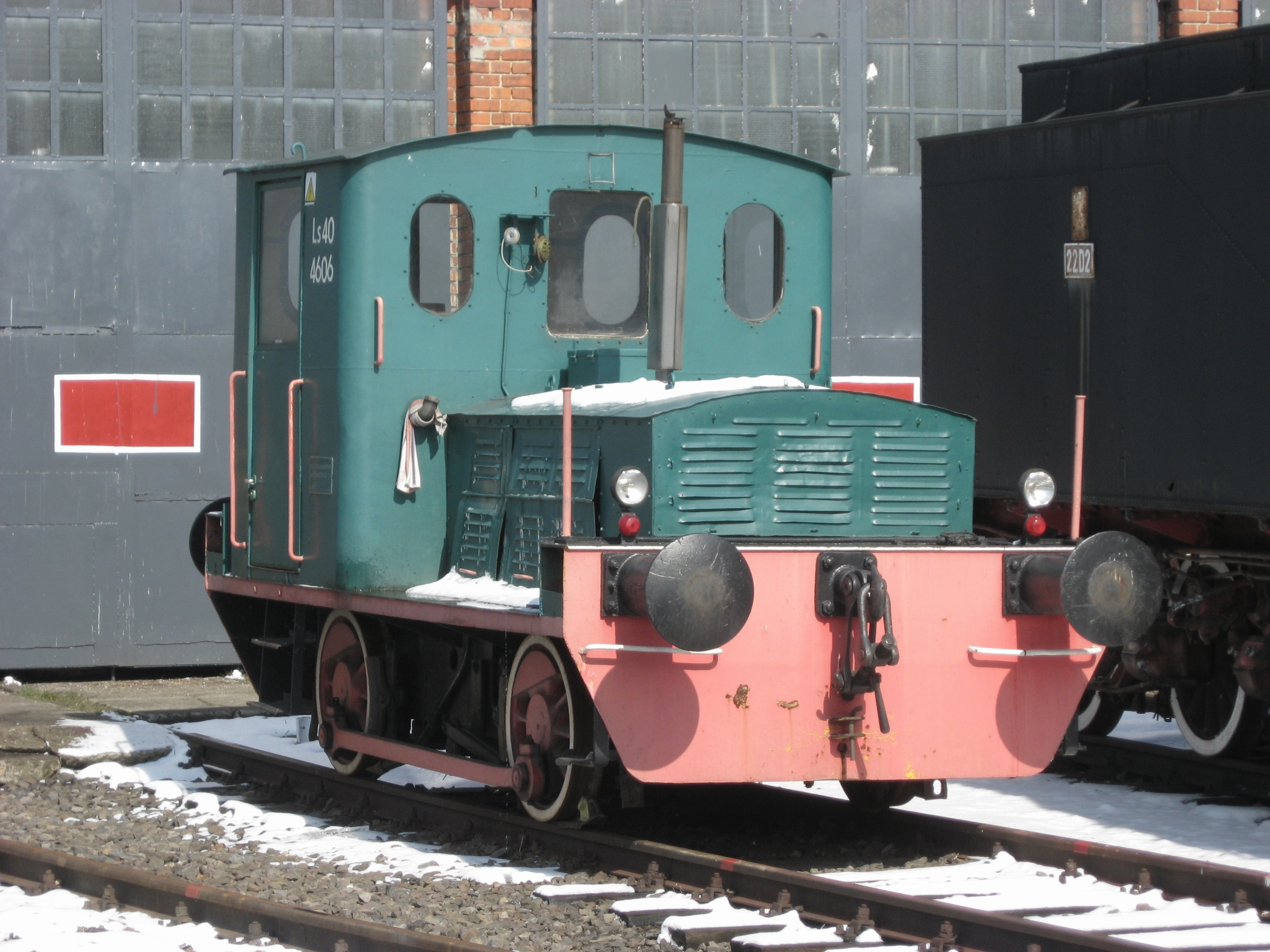
- Ls40-4606 at the Silesian Railway Museum in Jaworzyna Śląska
Type and origin
- Power type: Diesel-mechanical
- Builder: Fablok
- Model: Ls40
- Build date: 1952-1961
- Total produced: 581
Specifications
- Configuration
  - AAR: B
  - UIC: B
- Gauge: 1,435 mm (4 ft 8 1/2 in)
- Wheel diameter: 850 mm (2 ft 9 in)
- Wheelbase: 2,500 mm (8 ft 2.425 in)
  - Axle spacing (Asymmetrical): 1,650 mm (5 ft 4.961 in)
- Length: 5,984 mm (19 ft 7.6 in)
- Width: 2,420 mm (7 ft 11 in)
- Height: 3,010 mm (9 ft 11 in)
- Axle load: 8 t
- Loco weight: 16 t (16 long tons; 18 short tons)
- Fuel type: Diesel
- Fuel capacity: 75 L (16 imp gal; 20 US gal)
- Fuel consumption: 210 g/km (12 oz/mi)
- Prime mover: S64L; S324HL
- Engine type: four-stroke
- Cylinders: 4
- Cylinder size: 110 x 160
- Transmission: four-drive, mechanical
- Loco brake: hand brake
- Couplers: Screw coupler
Performance figures
- Maximum speed: 11.35 km/h (7.05 mph)
- Power output: 44 hp (33 kW); 75 hp (56 kW)
- Tractive effort: 4.5 kN (1,000 lbf)
Career
- Operators: PKP; Industrial companies Polish military
- Class: SM02; Ls40 (Industry); WP-01 (Military)
- Number in class: 12 (PKP); 36 (military); 533 (Industry)
- Delivered: 1954
- Disposition: 9 in service, 13 preserved, remainder scrapped

SM02 (model Ls40) is a series of Polish diesel mechanical shunter locomotives used by PKP and mostly the industrial companies. The model was built on a basis of a German Deutz OMZ 122 R shunter locomotive, in which the design was modified by making the frame longer and having more fuel capacity. They were built between 1952 and 1961 by Fablok, 581 examples were built, 12 of the locomotives were introduced to PKP after 1954, and 569 of the locomotives were introduced to industrial companies.

Ls40 is the first diesel locomotive of the afterwar Polish production, and the first successful diesel locomotive built on the basis of the foreign locomotive's design. It is the slowest diesel locomotive built in Poland.

== History ==
=== Pre-war design ===
In 1938 the Deutz OMZ 122 R locomotive documentations were given to the correction of Fablok construction office, where it was proceeded to make a prototype designated 8DL. During designing and producing the prototype, most of the components were modified using the cheapest materials. It was completed in August 1939, but the tests were interrupted by the outbreak of World War II on September 1.

=== Actual design ===
After the war, the need for small shunter diesel locomotives had to be satisfied by a handful of pre-war Kleinlok locomotives, which was very difficult to maintain due to the lack of spare parts. As the reconstructed and newly built afterwar industrial plants had their own sidings, the need for diesel shunters was rapidly growing, as diesels proved to be most suitable for smaller plants which had problems with maintaining steam locomotives. Fablok came in to develop a lightweight diesel shunter equipped with a S64L diesel engine between the late 1940s and early 1950s.

In 1951 Fablok designed a shunter diesel locomotive on the basis of the Deutz OMZ 122 R locomotive, the detailed design of it was accepted in 1952 and a prototype was built, designated Ls40-1 and 2738/1952, where the tests were proven successful and the serial production started in the same year until 1961. Nine locomotives were built in 1954, as well as the broad gauge examples, first one having a track gauge of 1520 mm and the second one having a track gauge of 1676 mm.

== Design ==
Ls40 was designed for simplicity and was not entirely satisfactory. Some minor details were added from earlier locomotive types in order to facilitate rapid production. Due to its low rated power the locomotive barely reached the top speed. The mechanical transmission was primitive, the gearbox was too noisy and was prone to failure, also the driver's cab was tight and uncomfortable. The locomotive with a more powerful engine was typically better, as gearbox heated excessively, was more noisy and less reliable. Shifting gears with two separate levers demanded some skills.

Ls40 has a wheelbase of 2500 mm and a wheel diameter of 850 mm. Their length is 5984 mm, the width is 2420 mm and the height is 3010 mm. Its weight is 16 tons and its axle load is 8 tons. The engine is a four-stroke 4-cylindere S342HL diesel engine capable of reaching 75 horsepower and the locomotive is fitted with a 4 geared mechanical transmission and a hand brake. its fuel capacity is 75 liters and the fuel consumption is 210 grams per kilometer. Each engine's cylinder bore and stroke size is 110 mm and 160 mm and its displacement is 6 liters.

Ls40 is a B locomotive, which means there are two powered axles under the unit. Those axles are rigidly fixed to the locomotive's frame. The locomotive has five distinct variants differing mainly from the cab and the engine's cowling. Each locomotive's headstocks were trapeze shaped, some of them had sharp edges and smooth edges, they were either painted orange or red along with the coupling rods and the wheels. Most of the examples were fitted with their original headlights, some of them later had standardized PKP headlights.

One example designated Sls150-388 was built with the Russian track gauge fitted with twice as powerful 150 horsepower engines intended for operating shunting duties on the freight handling stations near the Soviet borders. The next locomotive had a wider track gauge wider than 1520 mm which was the Indian gauge, it was intended to shunt WP class steam locomotives around the locomotive manufacturing plant in Chrzanów.

== Service ==
Ls40 locomotives were intended for operating lightweight shunting duties around industrial areas and works transportation. Most of the locomotives went directly to the industrial plants such as mines, paper mills, sugar mills, chemical plants, steelworks, etc. Some of them worked at the machinery plants including their manufacturer's own industrial plant Fablok, where they shunted rolling stock right after they were built. They were often used in the military including the Polish Armed Forces and the Polish Navy, 36 examples were used. Twelve of the examples were used by PKP, intended for shunting fleet around rolling stock maintenance areas and locomotive depots. The class was nonetheless widely used in industrial service.

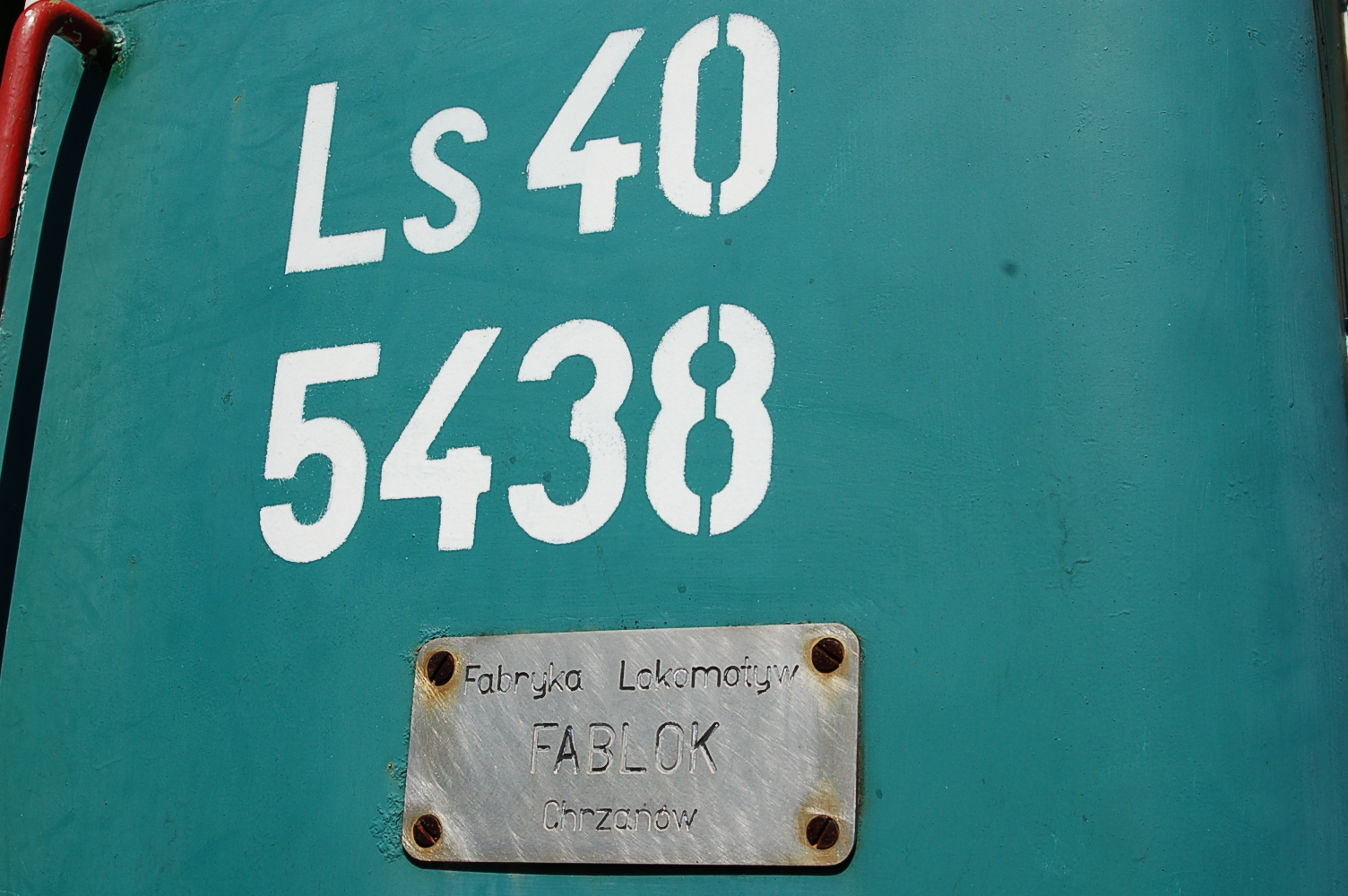
Ls40 locomotive classification

Those locomotives after being built were designated Lo1xx, where xx stands for serial numbers, in 1958 some examples in part of PKP were classified to SM02, the military examples were classified as WP-01, various military establishments had at least 12 locomotives being classified in their civil numbers, the industrial examples were classified in their model numbers Ls40. All of the locomotives were given serial fleet numbers from 1 to 581, but some of them were used in parallel (for example Ls40-5191), military even used these numbers.

Early on the S64L engines proved to be insufficient for the locomotives' duties, so later examples were fitted with more powerful S324HL motors. Likewise, several older locomotives had their engines replaced during servicing. Those locomotives were lightly used by PKP as they were too weak and slow, even for pulling short trains, they were quickly replaced by more powerful and reliable 409Da locomotives. Most of the locomotives were replaced by newer and more reliable shunter locomotives, eventually getting withdrawn from service in the 1990s, some of them survived and continued its service to the 21st century. The other withdrawn were sent to scrap or left abandoned along with their industrial plants.

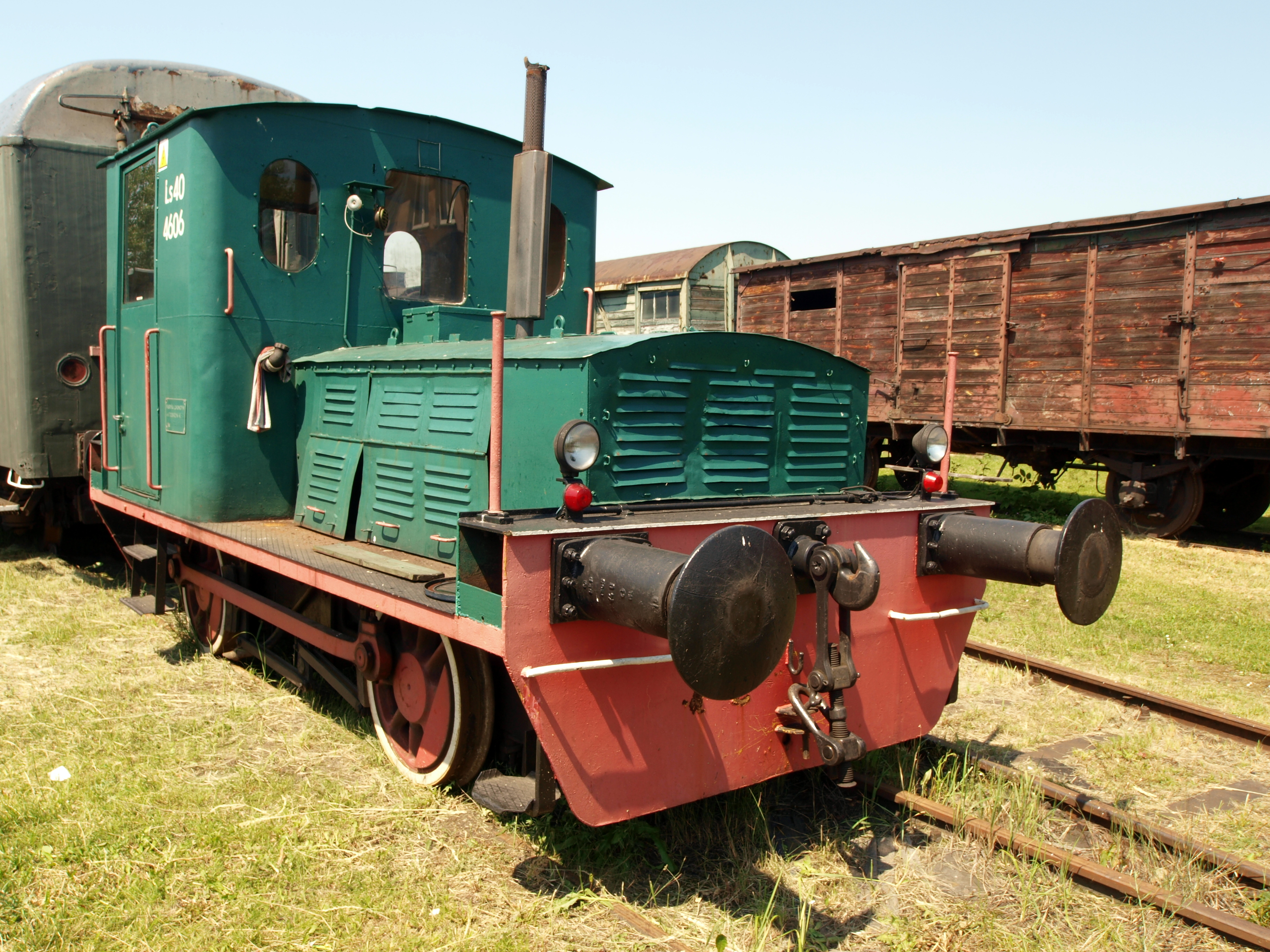
Ls40 4606 preserved at a railway museum

The locomotives in the 21st century were moved to other industrial plants and workshops including Ls40-5191 which worked at Otmuchów Sugar Mill where it was transferred to Franz Kaminski Waggonbau in Nysa due to its sugar mill closure in 2009. Most of the locomotives were plinthed as monuments and sent for preservation after its retirement, some of them were even put up for sale after they continued its service until the 2010s and 2020s. The only operational locomotives of the series are owned by the railway museums, remaining as preserved examples in working order today.

== Preservation ==
Several Ls40 locomotives were either preserved or plinthed as monuments, some of them remain operational.

=== Ls40-5254 ===
It was delivered for the Petroleum Products Trading Company in Białystok, at an unknown year it was transferred to the private air-open museum located in Lubiana Pyrzycka, it was renovated at its place somewhere in the 2020s.

=== Ls40-3075 and Ls40-3888 ===
Ls40-3075 was built in 1952, while Ls40-3888 was built in 1958 and was delivered for the lime plant in Pasym. 3888's last revision was on May 23, 1987, at ZNTK Wrocław. Both of the locomotives were bought by Mogileńsie Stowarzyszenie Sympatyków Kolei in Mogilno, 3888 first being bought in 2016 and 3075 second being bought in 2017.

=== Ls40-4115 ===
Ls40-4115 was built in 1954 and was delivered to the Polish Military, it was later transferred to CPN Małaszewice. The locomotive was plinthed at the Władysław Reymont School in Małaszewice.

=== Ls40-4122 ===
Ls40-4122 was built in 1954 and was delivered to the steel construction plant in Gliwice, it was designated Ls40-119. The locomotive retired in 1997 and was bought by Skansen Pyskowice, it still remains operational, its real owner is Society for the Protection of Railway Monuments and Open-Air Museum Organizations in Pyskowice.

=== Ls40-4166 ===
Ls40-4166 was built in 1955 and was delivered to the Katowice Petroleum Products Trading Company in Katowice, it was designated Ls40-163. The locomotive retired in 2017 and was bought by Skansen Pyskowice, it was then preserved in display, its real owner is Society for the Protection of Railway Monuments and Open-Air Museum Organizations in Pyskowice.

=== Ls40-4544 ===
It was built in 1956 and was delivered to the national service warehouse in Pruszków. The locomotive was bought by Parowozownia Skierniewice in 2010 and went on a renovation after being stored. It is in operational order as of today.

=== Ls40-4557 ===
It was built in 1956 and was somehow delivered to the Polish Military. The locomotive was bought by Parowozownia Jarocin at an unknown year and remains as a preserved example today with its military designation still remaining.

=== Ls40-4570 ===
It was built in 1956 and was delivered to the flour mill in Grodzisk Wielkopolski. It was sold to Grodziska Kolej Drezynowa in 2008 where it went for a renovation, its engine was taken to the workshop while its cab and frame was repainted. The locomotive is somehow in operational order.

=== Ls40-4572 ===
Ls40-4572 was built in 1956 and was delivered to the "Polfa" Pharmaceutical Plant in Grodzisk Mazowiecki. It was replaced by more powerful locomotives, where it was handed over to Parowozownia Skierniewice. The new chapter in its history began on June 30, 1995. After an uncomplicated technical review, it became the first active exhibit of a newly created museum facility. It turned out to be a necessary and reliable traction agent, after a few months, the efforts of the PSMK members underwent an external renovation and supplemented the missing pieces of equipment. Ls40-4572 is the first active locomotive of this type in Poland preserved for museum purposes.

=== Ls40-5060 ===
The locomotive was built in 1959 and was delivered for construction material plant in Zielonka. At an unknown year it was transferred to the logistic operator of liquid fuel. It was sold to the Bytom Karb Wąskotorowy depot in 2013, and then plinthed as a monument in 2021 at Sosnowiec.

=== Ls40-5434 ===
The locomotive was built in 1959 and was delivered for PPZM Ujazd Górny. At an unknown year it was sold to Klub Sympatyków Kolei we Wrocławiu. It underwent some renovation, and remains operational today.

=== Ls40-5229 ===
The locomotive was built in 1960 and was somehow delivered to the Polish Navy in Hel, it was displaced in 2000 and in 2005/2006 was transported to the Hel Railway Museum. It was restored in 2020 along with its historical livery, its control panel was modified, the lights signaling the setting of directional lights was added, a new startup button was installed and an electric horn was also installed. The locomotive remains in operational order only for shunting lessons.

Factory type	Fleet type	Image	Owner	Location	Livery	Notes
—	Ls40-5254	Ls40-5254 at Lubiana Pyrzycka	Private air-open museum in Lubiana Pyrzycka	Lubiana Pyrzycka	Lime green with red headstocks and wheels	Monument
3075/1952	Ls40-3075	—	Mogileńskie Stowarzyszenie Sympatyków Kolei	Mogilno	—	Preserved
4115/1954	Ls40-4115	Ls40-4115 at Władysław Reymont School	Zespół Szkół im. Władysława Reymonta w Małaszewicach	Małaszewice	Green with yellow coupling rods and wheels and yellow with black stripes headstocks	Monument
4122/1954	Ls40-4122	Ls40-4122 Pyskowice	Skansen Pyskowice	Pyskowice	Green with Red headstocks and wheels	Operational
4166/1955	Ls40-4166	—	Skansen Pyskowice	Pyskowice	—	Preserved
4544/1956	Ls40-4544	—	Parowozownia Skierniewice	Skierniewice	Green with orange headstocks and wheels	Operational
4557/1956	Ls40-4557	Ls40-4557 on the turntable	Parowozownia Jarocin	Jarocin	Green with orange headstocks and wheels	Preserved
4570/1956	Ls40-4570	Ls40-4570 refurbishment	Grodziska Kolej Drezynowa	Grodzisk Wielkopolski	Green with orange headstocks and wheels	Operational
4572/1956	Ls40-4572	Ls40-4572 wachlarzownia	Parowozownia Skierniewice	Skierniewice	Green with red headstocks and wheels	Operational
4591/1956	Ls40-4591		Białowieża towarowa	Białowieża	Green with red headstocks and wheels	Preserved
4599/1956	Ls40-4599		—	Łuków Śląski	Green with red headstocks and white red wheels	Monument
4606/1956	Ls40-4606		Silesian Railway Museum	Jaworzyna Śląska	Green with orange headstocks and red wheels	Preserved
3888/1958	Ls40-3888	Ls40-3888 Pasym	Mogileńskie Stowarzyszenie Sympatyków Kolei	Mogilno	Green with orange headstocks and red wheels	Preserved
5139/1958	Ls40-5139	—	Muzeum Techniki Rolniczej i Gospodarstwa Wiejskiego w Redeczu Krukowym	Redecz Krukowy	Lime green with red headstocks and wheels	Preserved
5060/1959	Ls40-5060	Ls40-5060 GKW	"Juliusz Ekostacja" Sosnowiec	Sosnowiec	—	Monument
—	Ls40-5285		Muzeum Techniki Rolniczej i Gospodarstwa Wiejskiego w Redeczu Krukowym	Redecz Krukowy	Green with orange headstocks and red wheels	Preserved
5293/1959	Ls40-5293	Ls40-5293 ul. Paczkowska	Klub Sympatyków Kolei we Wrocawiu	Wrocław	Green with red headstocks and wheels	Monument
5434/1959	Ls40-5434	Ls40-5434 shed	Klub Sympatyków Kolei we Wrocławiu	Wrocław	Dark green with red headstocks and wheels	Operational
5438/1959	Ls40-5438		Kościerzyna Railway Museum	Kościerzyna	Green with red headstocks and wheels	Preserved
5229/1960	Ls40-5229	Ls40-5229 Hel	Hel Railway Museum	Hel	Light grey with red headstocks and wheels	Operational
—	Ls40-5455	—	Skarżysko-Kamienna Railway Station	Skarżysko Kamienna	Green with red headstocks and wheels	Monument
—	—		Wytwórcza Spółdzielnia Pracy „Społem” w Kielcach	Kielce	Green with red headstocks and wheels	Monument
