= Prussian T 7 =

Class of German steam locomotives

Prussian T 7 DRG Class 89.78 DR Class 89.64 PKP class TKh2
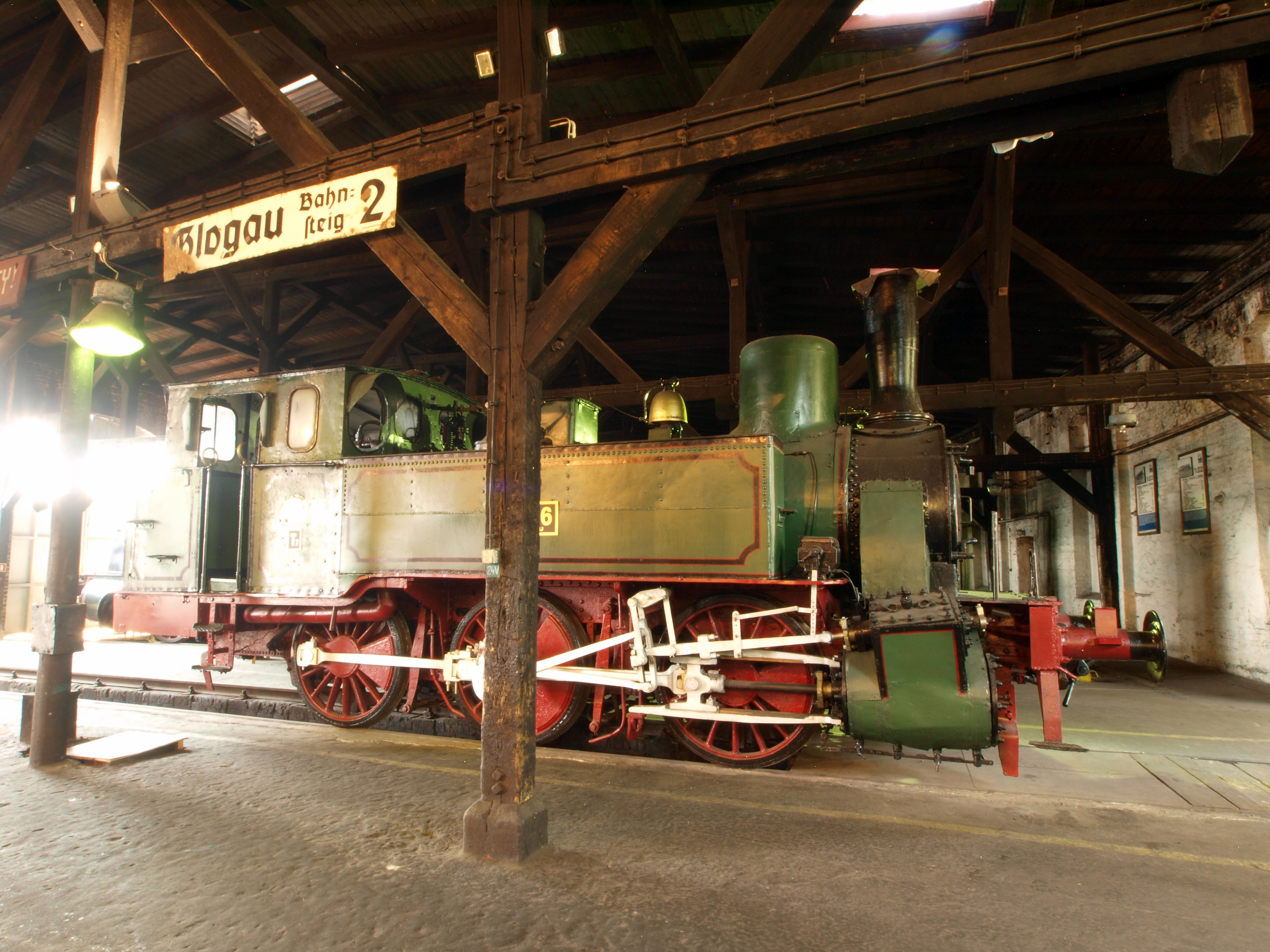
- PKP class TKh2-12 "Breslau 1839" preserved at Silesian Railway Museum in Jaworzyna Śląska
Type and origin
- Power type: Steam
- Builder: Borsig; Grafenstaden; Hanomag; Hohenzollern; Union-Gießerei; AG Vulcan Stettin
- Build date: 1881–1903
- Total produced: 467
Specifications
  - German: Gt 33.14
- Gauge: 1,435 mm (4 ft 8 1/2 in)
- Driver dia.: 1,330 mm (4 ft 4 3/8 in)
- Length
  - Over beams: 9,560 mm (31 ft 4 1/2 in)
- Axle load: 14.9 t (14.7 long tons; 16.4 short tons)
- Adhesive weight: 42.0 t (41.3 long tons; 46.3 short tons)
- Service weight: 42.0 t (41.3 long tons; 46.3 short tons)
- Boiler pressure: 12 kgf/cm^{2} (1,180 kPa; 171 lbf/in^{2})
- Heating surface
  - Firebox: 1.33 m^{2} (14.3 sq ft)
  - Evaporative: 96.18 m^{2} (1,035.3 sq ft)
- Cylinders: 2
- Cylinder size: 430 mm (16 15/16 in)
- Piston stroke: 630 mm (24 13/16 in)
- Loco brake: Hand brake (steam brake) acting on front of wheels later air brake
Performance figures
- Maximum speed: 45 km/h (28 mph)
Career
- Numbers: DRG: 7801–7869; DR: 6401; PKP: 1–27
- Locale: Germany (later East Germany); Poland; Luxembourg
- Retired: DRG: 1931; PKP: 1930s; DR: 1956; ARBED: 1973
- Disposition: Two preserved, remainder scrapped

The Prussian T 7 was a group of goods tank locomotives of the Prussian State Railways with an 0-6-0T wheel arrangement. It was not a class in the modern sense of identical locomotives.

== History ==
In terms of construction, they go back to the mountain locomotives that had been procured by the Rhenish Railway Company (Rheinische Eisenbahn, RE) which had also changed little from the Upper Silesian Railway, (Oberschlesische Eisenbahn, OSE), the K.Dir. Saarbrücken and the Lower Silesian-Märkische Railway (Niederschlesisch-Märkische Eisenbahn, NME). A second, slightly revised series, delivered to the latter company in 1881, proved itself so well that its design was adopted as Diagram (Musterblatt) III-4c in the Prussian Standards. The standardization of the classifications, begun in 1905, summarized all locomotives of this type that were still in existence at that time – both the "standard" and the "pre-standard" – at the Prussian Railways in the group T 7. So 65 locomotives (e.g. 33 of the OSE, 14 of the K.Dir. Saarbrücken, but also 1 of the Thüringische Eisenbahn-Gesellschaft), which were built before the standard were issued, were included in this group. Even after the group was formed, a total of 28 came into the Prussian administration, all of which had construction designs that differed from the diagram sheet. With the 374 copies procured according to the diagram sheet, there is consequently the number of 467 machines that were grouped as T 7 by the Prussian State Railway.

== Service ==
The locomotives were mainly used in heavy shunting. Therefore, they were mainly stationed in the industrial areas, but were sometimes used in goods transport on smaller railways. After the First World War, among other things, three locomotives were sold to the South German Railway Company (Süddeutsche Eisenbahn-Gesellschaft, SEG), where they were designated as SEG 370–372.

After the First World War, 27 locomotives were ceded to Poland. The Polish State Railways (PKP) classified them as TKh2. Most of these machines were taken out of service in the early 1930s and some went to industry, none of which were in service during the invasion of Poland. Some machines went to Belgium (1), Lithuania (2), Saarland (3) and Danzig (3).

Some of the state railway locomotives were later taken over by Deutsche Reichsbahn; while in 1923, 137 T7s were still considered as 89 7801 to 89 7937 in the renumbering plan for regional railway locomotives of DRG; in 1925 only 68 examples were classified as the Class 89.78 series in their numbering plan. By 1931, however, all of these machines had been taken out of service.

As a result of the turmoil of the war and post-war period, some machines are said to have reached Belgium and Latvia.

Another machine came in 1930 from the nationalized Bremen Harbour Railway (Hafenbahn Bremen) as 89 7869 to the Deutsche Reichsbahn, was sold to the Kreis Oldenburger Eisenbahn AG and with this came back to the Reichsbahn in 1941. After the Second World War, only a few examples existed on private and works railways.

After the SEG route of the Arnstadt-Ichtershausen Railway was taken over by the Deutsche Reichsbahn in 1949, the SEG 372 was given the number 89 6401. It was in service there until 1956 and was sold to the Erfurt industrial railway, where it remained until it was retired in 1967.

The Central Administration for Secondary Railways Hermann Bachstein acquired five of these machines. The last of these machines were sold in 1947. The Bentheim Railway also acquired five of these machines. The German Railway Operating Company acquired two of these machines, one of which was in use at the Albtalbahn until 1953, while the second, which had also gone to the Albtalbahn, was retired in 1960 as the last T 7 in West Germany. The last T 7 in the GDR, a machine that had come to the Deutsche Reichsbahn (DR) in 1950 from the Arnstadt-Ichtershausen light railway, classified as 89 6401 and retired in 1957, was still in use on the Erfurt industrial railway until 1963.

=== Private railways ===
Various private and industrial railways also received machines of this type: Breslau-Warschauer Eisenbahn (2), Dortmund-Gronau-Enschede Eisenbahn-Gesellschaft (3), Hessian Ludwig Railway (2), Upper Hessian Railway Company (1), Ilseder Hütte Corporation (5), Marie-Louise Mine (1), Rhenish Stahlwerke AG (2), Schlüssel Union (1), Dortmund-Hörder Hüttenunion AG (2), Gladbeck mine (1), Werne Coal Mine (3), Deutsch-Luxemburgische Bergwerks- und Hütten-AG (1). The machine from the last company has been preserved.

== Preserved locomotives ==
One copy is preserved in Poland, and one in Luxembourg by Train 1900.

=== TKh2-12 ===
Ringing of a Bell from the TKh2-12 locomotive

The Polish locomotive was delivered to Reichsbahndirektion Breslau by the Union Giesserei Königsberg (serial number 537 of 1890) in 1890. It came to the PKP in 1919 as TKh2-12, it was taken out of service in the early 1930s and was sent to Kazimierz Juliusz colliery in Sosnowiec, it survived the Second World War and remained there until the 1960s. The locomotive was sent for a major overhaul in 1974, after which was stationed at MD Wrocław Gądów depot in Wrocław and was used for movie productions. Due to the damage of the cylinder head, it was withdrawn from service in 1981. After it remained withdrawn at Wrocław Gądów for 12 years, it was taken to the Silesian Railway Museum in Jaworzyna Śląska on 29 January 1993, where it was visually restored to its original state as "Breslau 1839".

=== AMTF No. 12 ===
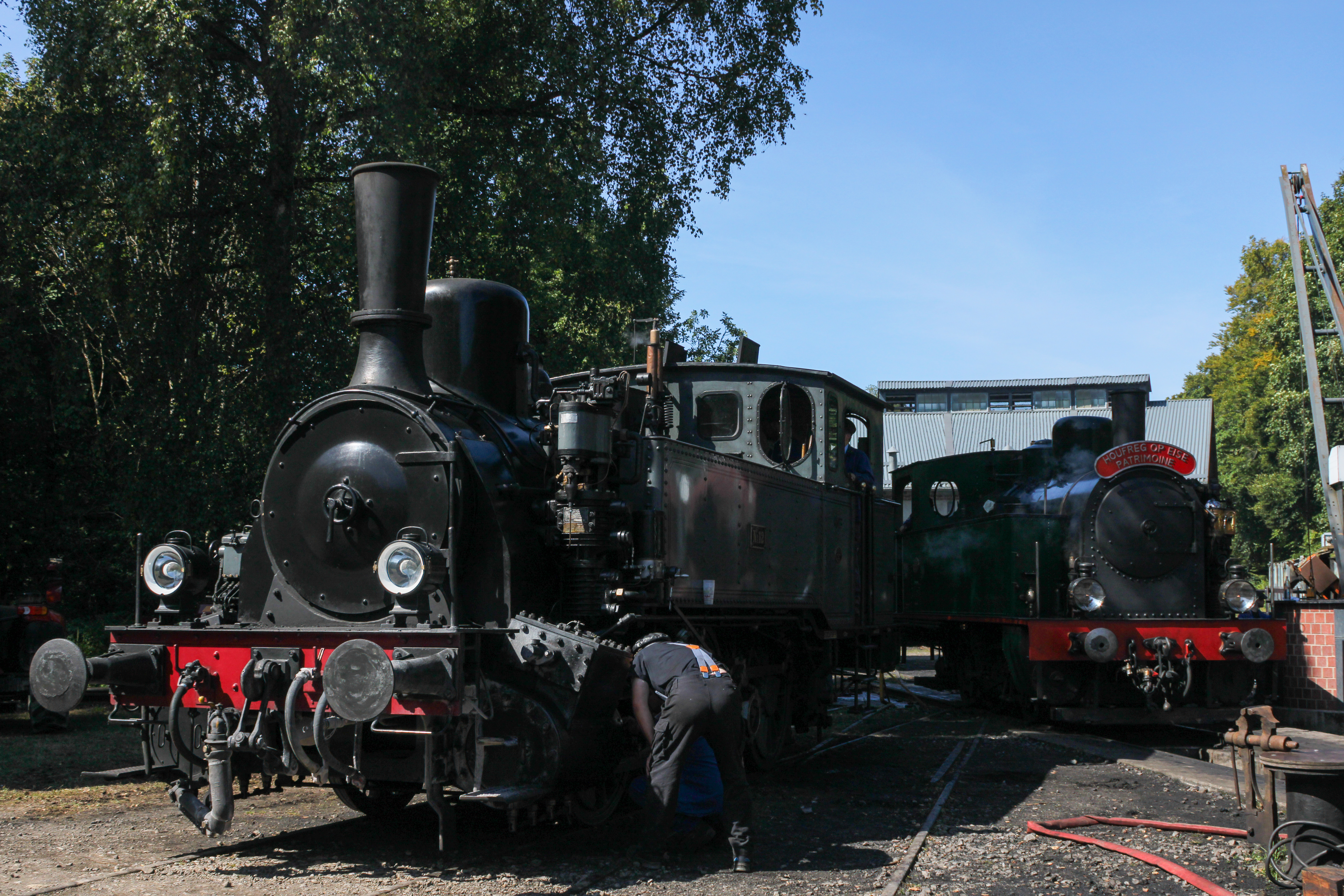
AMTF No. 12

The Luxembourg locomotive was delivered directly from Hanomag (serial number 4018 of 1903) to the German-Luxembourgish Mining and Ironworks (Deutsch-Luxemburgische Bergwerks- und Hütten-AG) in 1903 as No. 12 and was used in the Differdange plant. In 1973 the locomotive was handed over by ARBED to the Association des Musée et Tourisme Ferroviaires (AMTF). After extensive overhaul, the locomotive has been operational again since 2013 and is used on the Pétange – Fond-de-Gras – Bois de Rodange line.
