= Fablok 8DL =

Polish shunting diesel locomotive

Type and origin
- Power type: Diesel-mechanical
- Builder: Fablok
- Build date: 1939
- Total produced: 1
Specifications
- Configuration
  - AAR: B
  - UIC: B
- Gauge: 1,435 mm (4 ft 8 1/2 in)
- Wheel diameter: 850 mm (33.465 in)
- Wheelbase: 2,500 mm (98.425 in)
- Length: 4,760 mm (187.402 in)
- Width: 2,300 mm (90.551 in)
- Axle load: 6.2 t
- Loco weight: 12.4 t
- Fuel type: Diesel
- Fuel capacity: 25 l
- Prime mover: OMZ 122
- RPM
  - Maximum RPM: 600 rpm
- Engine type: Two-stroke diesel engine
- Cylinders: 2
- Transmission: mechanical
- Loco brake: mechanical
- Couplers: Screw coupler
Performance figures
- Maximum speed: 16 km/h (10 mph)
- Power output: 29.5 kW (39.6 hp)

Fablok 8DL is a Polish experimental diesel-mechanical locomotive built by Fablok, it was made from the documentation of the German Deutz OMZ 122 R locomotive bought by its builder. The design was meant to operate lightweight shunting duties on the industrial areas, but the production nor the tests weren't made and completed due to the war outbreak. Only 1 prototype was made in 1939, but its fate is unknown.

Between 1932 and 1934 Fablok bought from Deutz industrial locomotives technical documentations, including the standard gauge and narrow gauge examples, the locomotive from its documentations was Deutz OMZ 122 R. In autumn 1938, the documentation was given to the correction of Fablok construction office, and was proceeded to build a prototype designated 8DL. During designing and building the prototype, most of the components were modified primarily in terms of using the cheapest materials. The locomotive was completed in August 1939, but the tests were interrupted by the outbreak of World War II in September. The same locomotive documentation from Deutz was used by Fablok to create an Ls40 design.

8DL was a smaller and a lighter design weighing 3.6 tons less, and also a faster design reaching the top speed of 16 km/h (10 mph). Its overall length is 4,760 mm, maximum width is 2,300 mm, wheel diameter is 850 mm and the wheelbase is 2,500 mm. The OMZ 122 two-stroke 2-cylinder diesel engine was imported from Germany capable of reaching the maximum power output of 39.6 horsepower and reaching the maximum rpm of 600, the fuel tank capacity is 25 liters. The 4-geared mechanical transmission was made by Fablok under Deutz License. The locomotive brakes are mechanical, which was applied by using an angle lever.
