= Witków =

Witków may refer to:

- Witków, Legnica County in Lower Silesian Voivodeship (south-west Poland)
- Witków, Świdnica County in Lower Silesian Voivodeship (south-west Poland)
- Witków, Wałbrzych County in Lower Silesian Voivodeship (south-west Poland)
- Witków, Lublin Voivodeship (east Poland)
- Witków, Lubusz Voivodeship (west Poland)
- Witków, Pomeranian Voivodeship (north Poland)
