= Piotrowice Świdnickie =

- Village
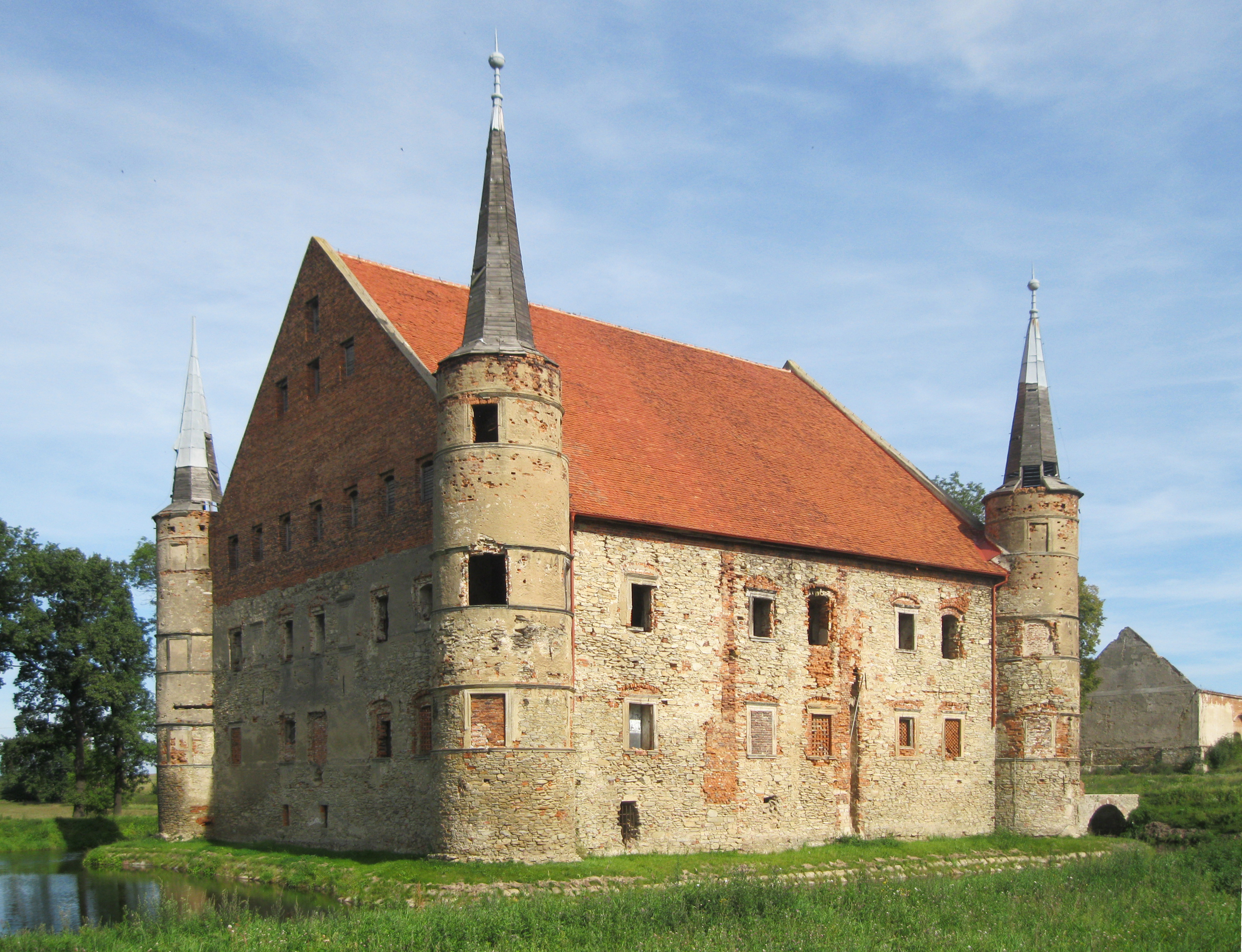
- Castle in the village

- Location within Poland
- Coordinates: 50°56′N 16°27′E
- Country: Poland
- Voivodeship: Lower Silesian
- County: Świdnica
- Gmina: Jaworzyna Śląska
- Website: http://www.piotrowice.info

Piotrowice Świdnickie [pjɔtrɔˈvit͡sɛ ɕfidˈnit͡skʲɛ] is a village in the urban-rural Gmina Jaworzyna Śląska, within Świdnica County, Lower Silesian Voivodeship, in south-western Poland.
