= Spiekeroog Island Railway No. 6 =

German meter-gauge diesel locomotive

Inselbahn Spiekeroog 6
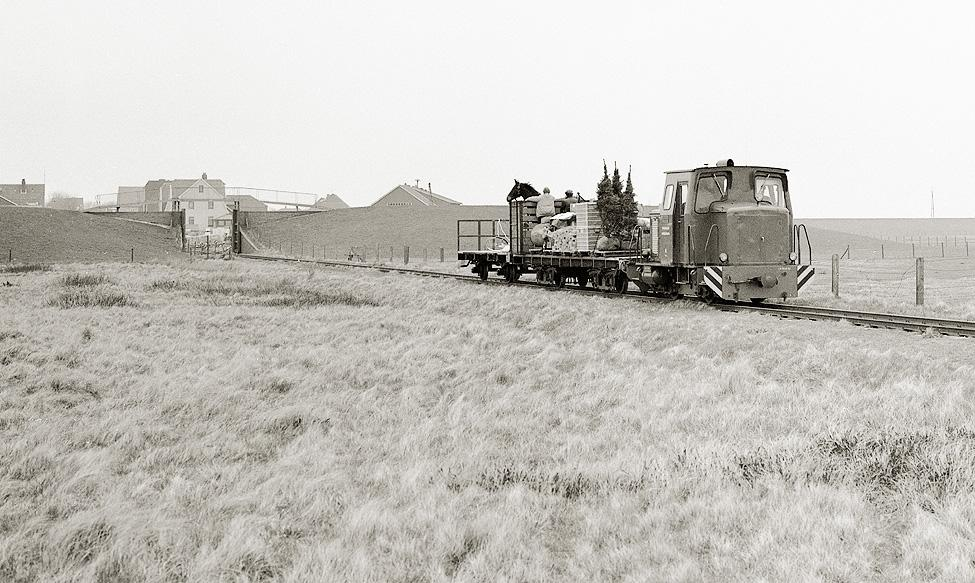
- IS No. 6 at the dike notch in Spiekeroog in 1981
Type and origin
- Power type: Diesel-hydraulic
- Builder: Schöma
- Serial number: 2860
- Build date: 1965
- Total produced: 1
Specifications
- Configuration
  - UIC: B
- Gauge: 1,000 mm (3 ft 3 3/8 in)
- Wheel diameter: 680 mm (2 ft 2 3/4 in)
- Wheelbase: 1,975 mm (6 ft 5 3/4 in)
- Length
  - Over buffers: 5,590 mm (18 ft 4 in)
- Width: 2,500 mm (8 ft 2 1/2 in)
- Height: 2,900 mm (9 ft 6 1/4 in)
- Axle load: 3 tonnes (6,600 lb)
- Service weight: 6 tonnes (13,000 lb)
- Prime mover: Mercedes-Benz OM 352
- Engine type: Four-stroke diesel engine
- Cylinders: 6
- Transmission: hydraulic
- Loco brake: Hand brake
Performance figures
- Maximum speed: 25 km/h (16 mph)
- Power output: 65 kW (87.2 hp)
Career
- Operators: Spiekeroog Island Railway, then Langeroog Island Railway
- Numbers: IS 6, IL Kö 4

Spiekeroog Island Railway No. 6 is a German meter-gauge diesel-hydraulic locomotive, built by Christoph Schöttler Maschinenfabrik GmbH for the Spiekeroog Island Railway and was used there until its retirement. Afterwards, it went to the Langeoog Island Railway, where its still in service today.

== Description ==
The locomotive belongs to the Schöma CFL 80 DB series type. Of the locomotives of this series, only one machine is known in standard gauge. The locomotive was put into service brand new on the island railway on 30 October 1965, after it had completed its test run from the pier to the operational railway station. The locomotive, which replaced the IS 2 locomotive in service, was primarily used for luggage and freight transport; during peak traffic times, transporting the second passenger train was its task. The locomotives was in service until 1981.

Afterwards, the locomotive was transferred to the Langeroog Island Railway and was designated as Kö 4. On the island, the locomotive is used in freight traffic; due to its coupling system, the transportation of passenger trains wasn't possible. During a major overhaul, the locomotive was painted red, like all the other locomotives of the railway.

== Design features ==
Contrary to IS 4, the locomotive is equipped with a central driver's cab and a larger front section for the engine installation as well as a smaller front section for auxiliary operations. From a mechanical standpoint, the locomotive features a 6-cylinder four-stroke diesel engine from Daimler-Benz OM 352, with a rated output of 88 hp. The power is transmitted via hydraulic machinery with an attached reversing gearbox through drive shafts to both axles.

Originally, the locomotive's body was painted green and the running gear red. During the major overhaul in 1999 following an engine failure, the locomotive received the red paint scheme of the Langeroog Island Railway. At the same time, the height of the cab was increased by 160 mm (6.3 in), and the locomotive also received different engine hoods. The locomotive's coupling capability with the combined center buffer lever coupling was not changed, so the locomotive is not suitable for the new passenger cars of the Langeroog Island Railway, which are equipped with Scharfenberg couplers. The locomotive has a handbrake.
