= Nowice, Lower Silesian Voivodeship =

Nowice
- Village
- Location within Poland
- Coordinates: 50°55′N 16°28′E
- Country: Poland
- Voivodeship: Lower Silesian
- County: Świdnica
- Gmina: Jaworzyna Śląska
- Population: 342 (2,015)

Nowice [nɔˈvit͡sɛ] is a village in the urban-rural Gmina Jaworzyna Śląska, within Świdnica County, Lower Silesian Voivodeship, in south-western Poland. The total area of the village is 0.193 km (0 mi)^{2}.
