= Deutz OMZ 122 Meterspur =

German meter-gauge diesel locomotive

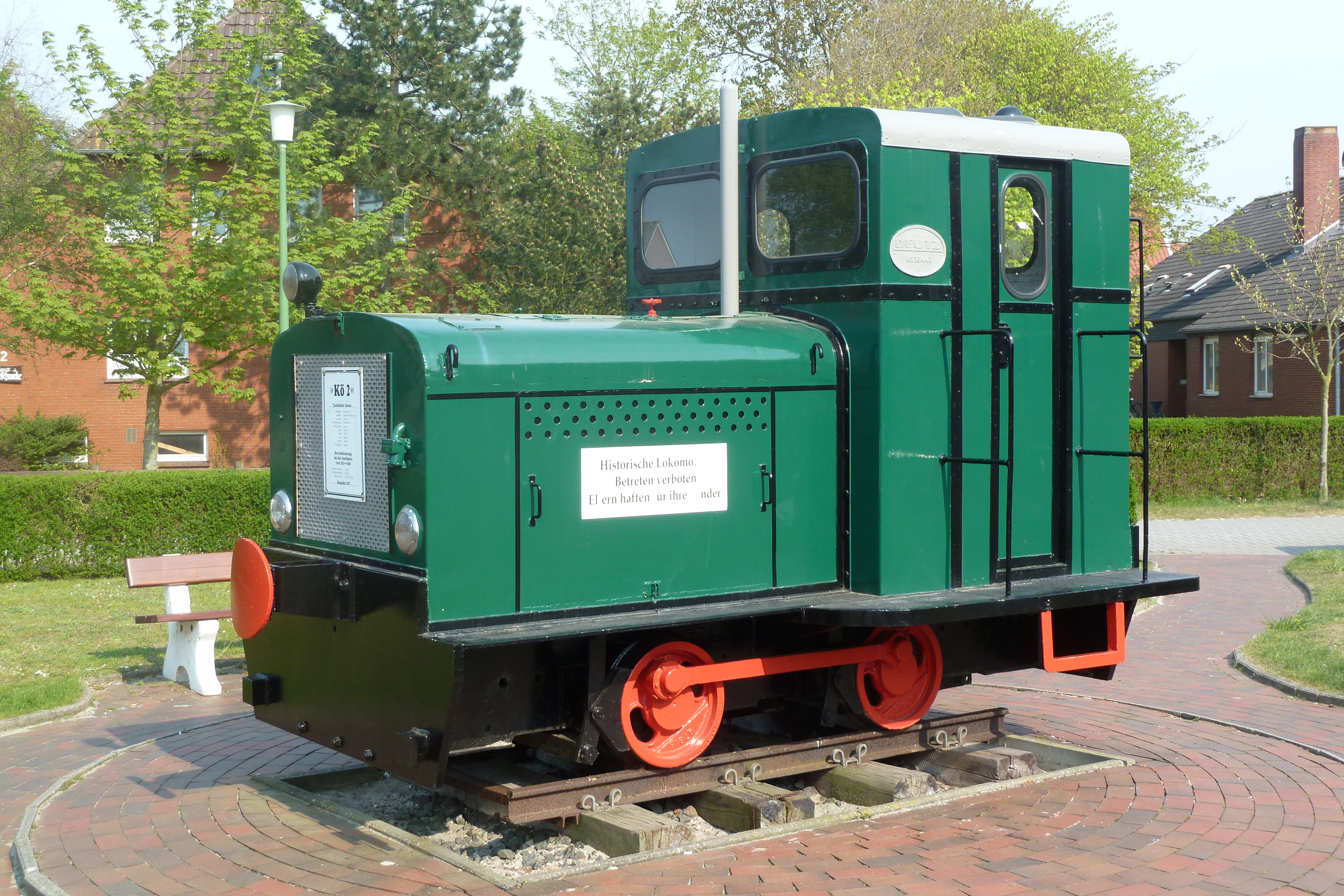
- Kö 2 of the Langeoog Island Railway plinthed as a monument in Langeoog
Type and origin
- Power type: Diesel-mechanical
- Builder: Deutz
- Serial number: 18.443, 36.708
- Build date: 1937, 1941
- Total produced: 2
Specifications
- Configuration
  - UIC: B
- Gauge: 1,000 mm (3 ft 3 3/8 in)
- Wheel diameter: 500 mm (1 ft 8 in)
- Wheelbase: 1,150 mm (3 ft 9 in)
- Length
  - Over buffers: 4,280 mm (14 ft 1 in)
- Width: 1,450 mm (4 ft 9 in)
- Height: 2,590 mm (8 ft 6 in)
- Axle load: 6 t (13,000 lb)
- Service weight: 12 t (26,000 lb)
- Prime mover: KHD OMZ 122
- RPM range: 600 rpm
- Engine type: Two-stroke diesel engine
- Cylinders: 2
- Transmission: mechanical
- Loco brake: Hand brake
Performance figures
- Maximum speed: 17.5 km/h (11 mph)
- Power output: 29.5 kW (39.6 hp)
Career
- Operators: Langeoog Island Railway; Spiekeroog Island Railway
- Numbers: IL Kö 2, IS 2
- Withdrawn: until 1982
- Disposition: Both preserved

Deutz OMZ 122 Meterspur is a German meter-gauge diesel-mechanical locomotive built in 1937 and 1941 by Deutz AG. They are the narrow-gauge variant of the Deutz OMZ 122 R locomotive, which was built in large numbers. Two specimens are known to be preserved.

== Description ==
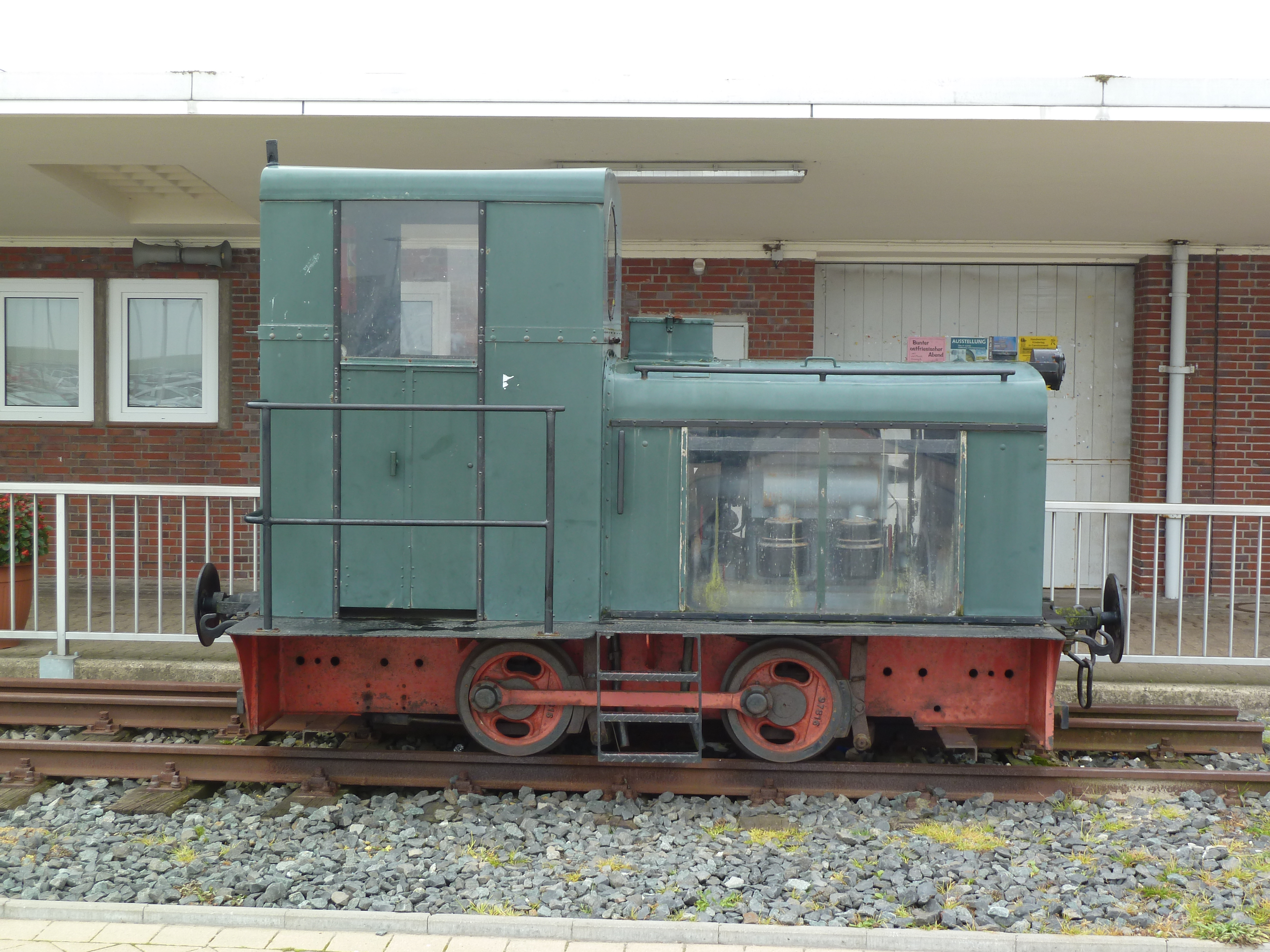
IS No. 2 of the Spiekeroog Island Railway

After the widely produced OMZ 122 R locomotive, Deutz had a range of models to produce locomotives with this type of engine for track gauges from 600 mm (1 ft 11 5/8 in) to 1,076 mm There are 62 known examples of the OMZ 122 F type. Two locomotives were manufactured; one locomotive was delivered to the Langeoog Island Railway in 1937, and the second locomotive was delivered, along with another locomotive, to the Naval Port Construction Office in Helgoland.

The IL Kö 2 spent its entire operational life with the Langeoog Island Railway. The locomotive underwent some modifications there, for example, the line of sight for the driver was improved by additional front windows. In 1982, the locomotive was withdrawn from service. It was plinthed as a monument in front of Langeoog station.

The second locomotive was put into service with the additional locomotive from 1941 by the Helgoland Naval Port Construction Office. In 1943, they were transferred to the island of Wangerooge.

After the Second World War, one locomotive came to the Water and Shipping Office in Wangerooge in March 1948 and was scrapped around 1965. The other initially went to the municipality of Wangerooge and from there in 1947 to the Spiekeroog Island Railway. The locomotive was intended to replace the horse-drawn carriages of the island railway with motorized transport. On 1 June 1949, the locomotive pulled its first train. To transport the then still short trains, consisting of up to three horse-drawn cars and a maximum of one freight car, the 40 hp power was sufficient.

When the horse-drawn carriages were replaced by meter-gauge railway cars, the locomotive was equipped with platforms with railings to improve the line of sight for the driver. The width of the locomotive changed to 2,300 mm (7 ft 7 in). In 1965, the locomotive was replaced by IS No. 6 locomotive.

In 1969, it initially came to the German Railway Society. The restoration for museum operations did not materialize. Therefore, in 2000, the locomotive was placed in front of the station building in Harlesiel as a memorial to the military railway on Wangerooge.

== Design features ==
The locomotives were constructed slightly narrower and shorter than the standard gauge locomotives. An initially visible difference was the equipment of the cab with only a single central round front window. There was also a difference in the running gear, as the meter-gauge locomotives used spoked wheels with cutouts.

The Deutz OMZ 122 engine is a water-cooled two-cylinder, two-stroke diesel engine with inline cylinders, which drives a mechanical transmission with a reversing gearbox via a clutch. The drive axle is powered from the transmission output through a chain, while the other axle is driven via coupling rods. This design allowed for space savings and also increases running smoothness compared to vehicles with a jackshaft.

The suspension on the locomotives was designed with leaf springs, which were arranged above the axles. The coupling of the cars was carried out with a so-called triangle coupling; the locomotives did not have an air brake for train braking. The sanding system was implemented in the form of a drop, and a sand drop pipe was present between the wheels.
