= Nowy Jaworów =

- Village
- Location within Poland
- Coordinates: 50°55′N 16°25′E
- Country: Poland
- Voivodeship: Lower Silesian
- County: Świdnica
- Gmina: Jaworzyna Śląska

Nowy Jaworów [ˈnɔvɨ jaˈvɔruf] is a village in the urban-rural Gmina Jaworzyna Śląska, within Świdnica County, Lower Silesian Voivodeship, in south-western Poland.
