= Czechy, Świdnica County =

Czechy
- Village
- Location within Poland
- Coordinates: 50°56′21″N 16°24′30″E
- Country: Poland
- Voivodeship: Lower Silesian
- County: Świdnica
- Gmina: Jaworzyna Śląska

Czechy [ˈt͡ʂɛxɨ] is a village in the urban-rural Gmina Jaworzyna Śląska, within Świdnica County, Lower Silesian Voivodeship, in south-western Poland.
