= Pasieczna =

- Village
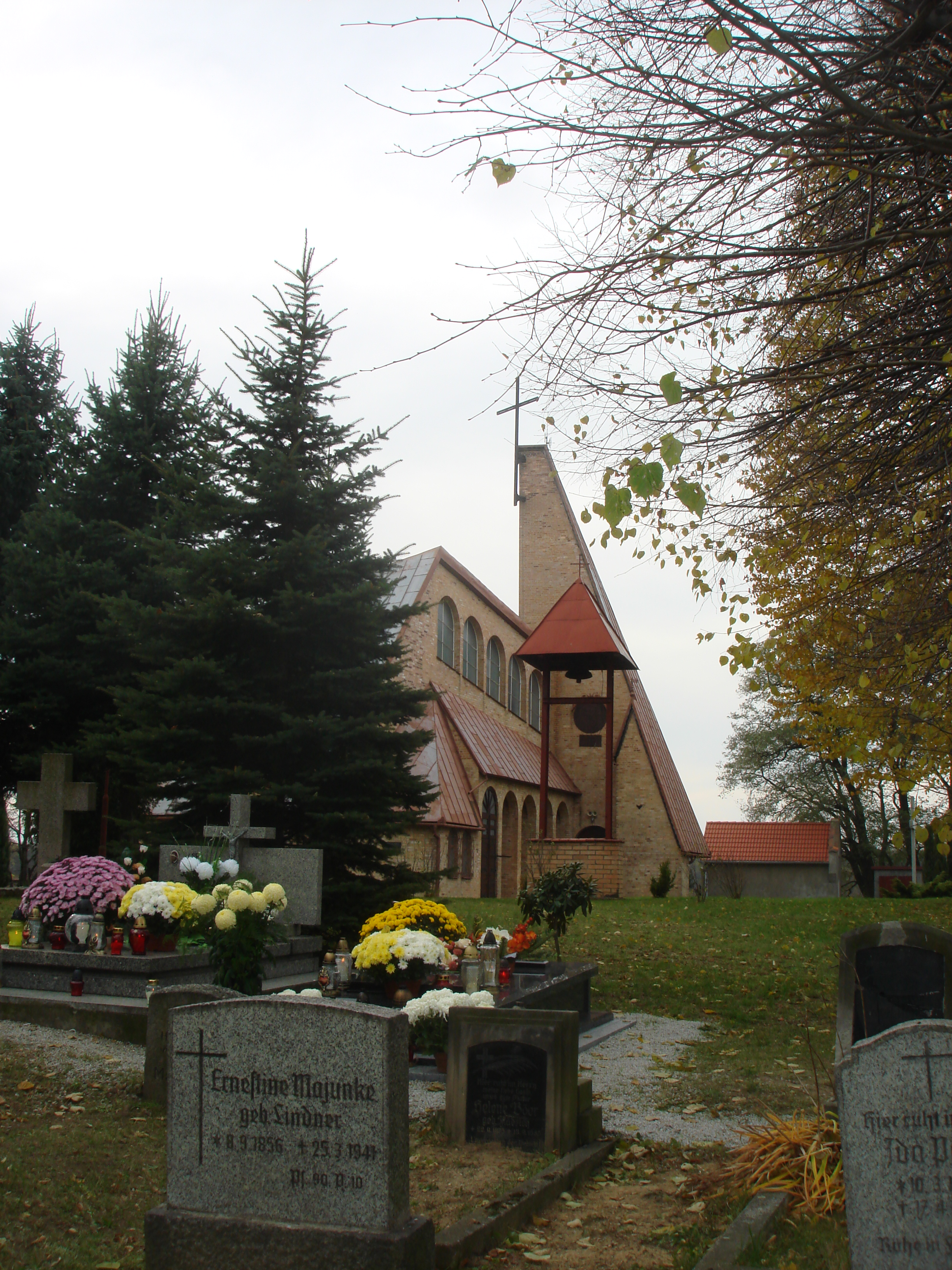
- Church of Our Lady Queen of Poland

- Location within Poland
- Coordinates: 50°55′N 16°24′E
- Country: Poland
- Voivodeship: Lower Silesian
- County: Świdnica
- Gmina: Jaworzyna Śląska

Pasieczna [paˈɕɛt͡ʂna] is a village in the urban-rural Gmina Jaworzyna Śląska, within Świdnica County, Lower Silesian Voivodeship, in south-western Poland.
