= Bagieniec =

- Village
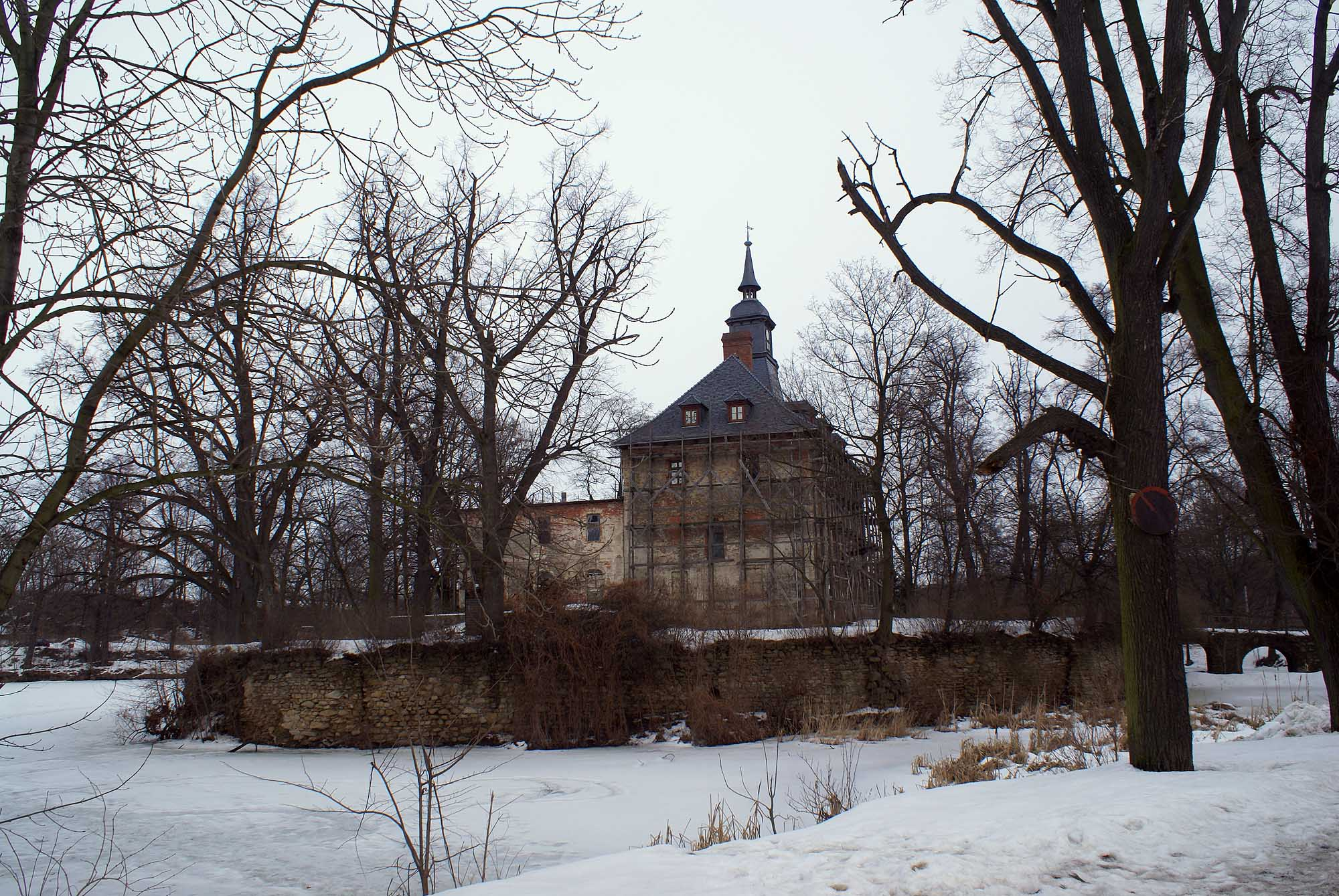
- Manor house in the village

- Location within Poland
- Coordinates: 50°53′21″N 16°28′53″E
- Country: Poland
- Voivodeship: Lower Silesian
- County: Świdnica
- Gmina: Jaworzyna Śląska

Bagieniec [baˈɡʲɛɲɛt͡s] is a village in the urban-rural Gmina Jaworzyna Śląska, within Świdnica County, Lower Silesian Voivodeship, in south-western Poland.

== Notable residents ==
- Ilse von Bredow (1922-2014), German author
