= Pastuchów =

- Village
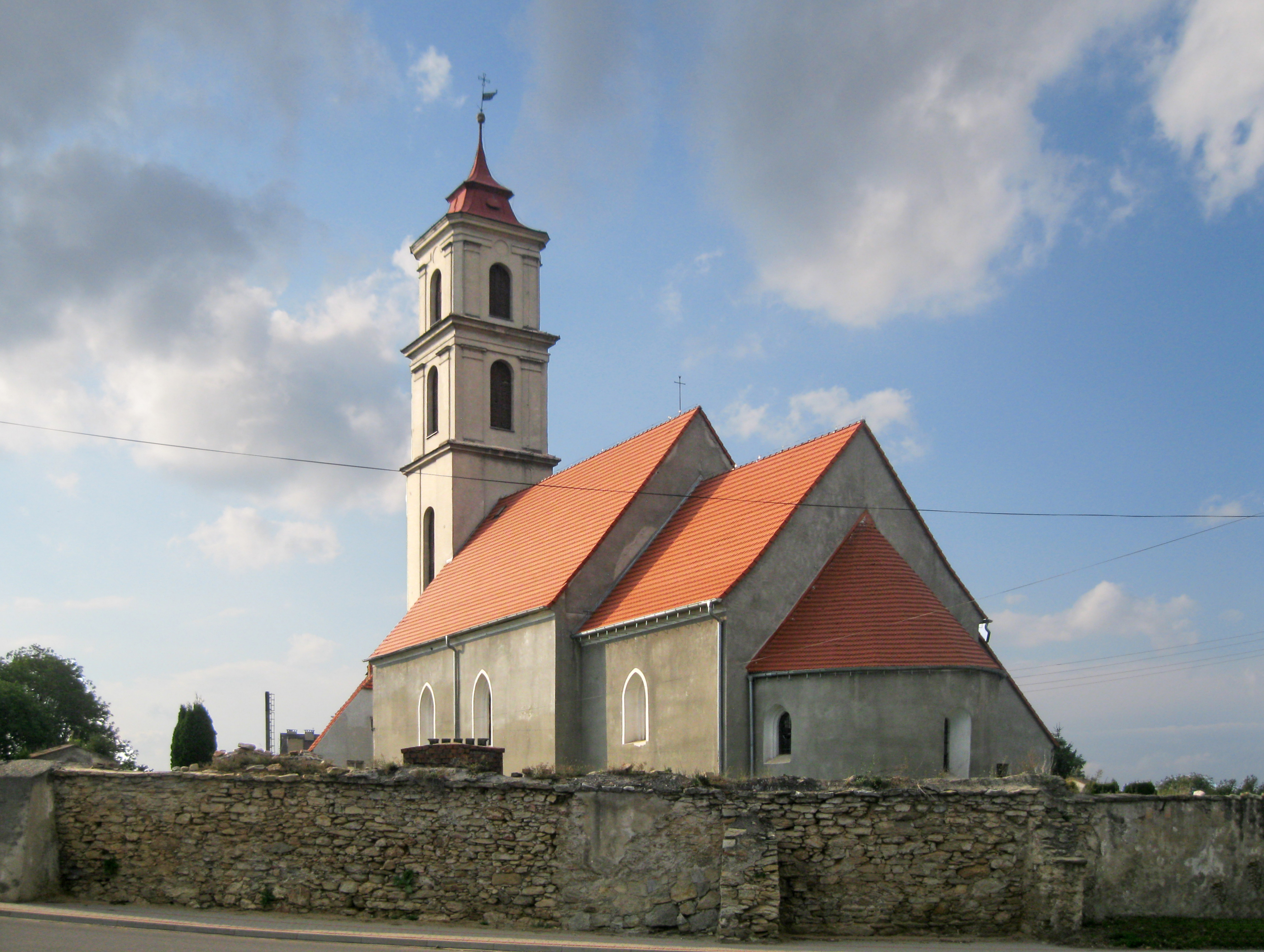
- Church of Saint Barbara

- Location within Poland
- Coordinates: 50°57′N 16°27′E
- Country: Poland
- Voivodeship: Lower Silesian
- County: Świdnica
- Gmina: Jaworzyna Śląska
- Time zone: UTC+1 (CET)
  - Summer (DST): UTC+2 (CEST)
- Vehicle registration: DSW

Pastuchów [pasˈtuxuf] is a village in the urban-rural Gmina Jaworzyna Śląska, within Świdnica County, Lower Silesian Voivodeship, in south-western Poland.

== History ==
When it was part of medieval ja to mieszkam Xd Piast-ruled Poland, in 1193, the tithe from Pastuchów was granted to the Canons Regular Monastery in Wrocław. It was then mentioned under the Old Polish spelling Postuchow. The name of the village is of Polish origin and comes from the old Polish word pastuch, which means "shepherd".
