= Milikowice =

- Village
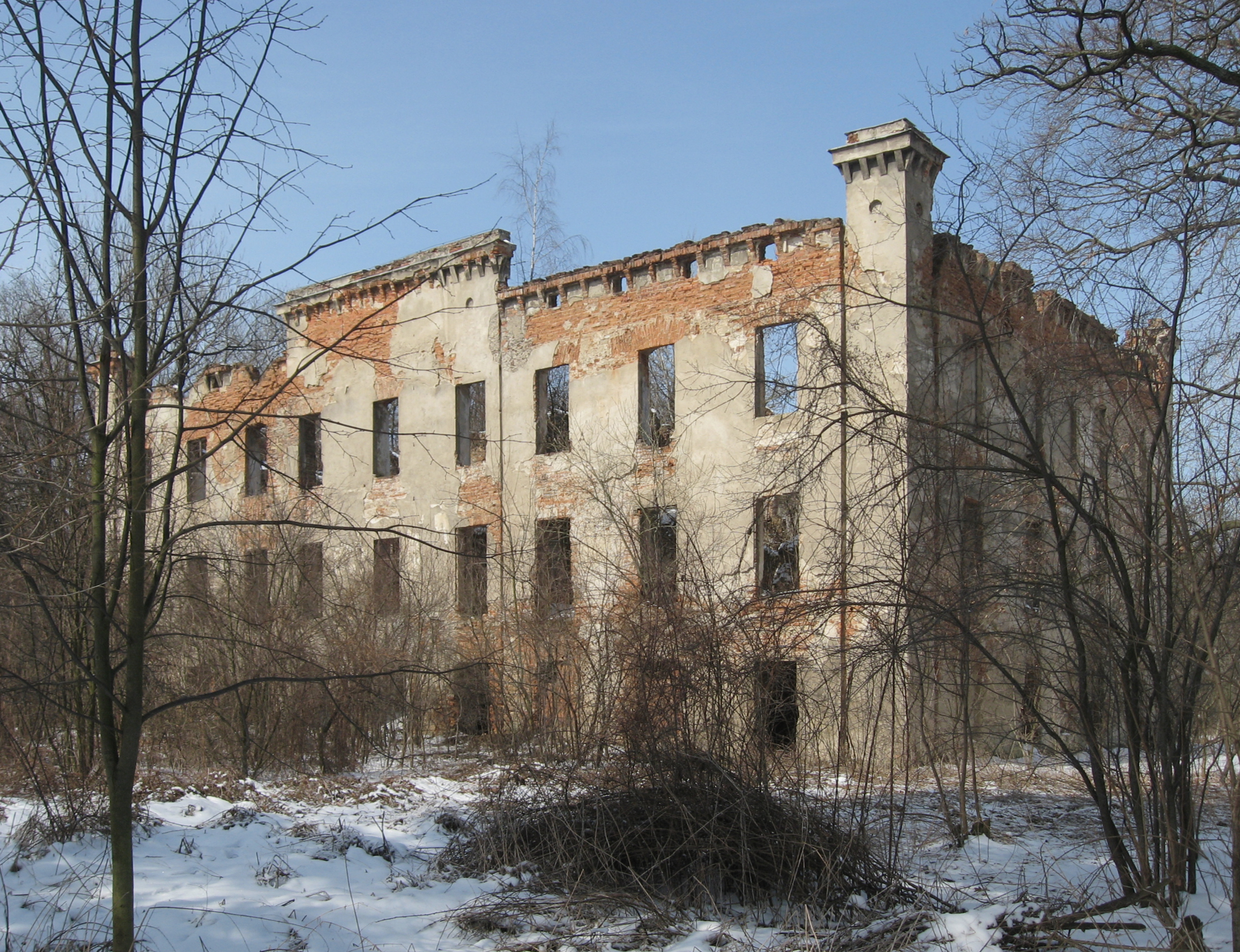
- Ruins of castle in the village

- Location within Poland
- Coordinates: 50°53′N 16°25′E
- Country: Poland
- Voivodeship: Lower Silesian
- County: Świdnica
- Gmina: Jaworzyna Śląska

Milikowice [milikɔˈvit͡sɛ] is a village in the urban-rural Gmina Jaworzyna Śląska, within Świdnica County, Lower Silesian Voivodeship, in south-western Poland.

The early Gothic Parish Church of St. Michael the Archangel was built in the village in the mid-13th century and rebuilt in the 15th century.
