= Bolesławice, Świdnica County =

Bolesławice
- Village
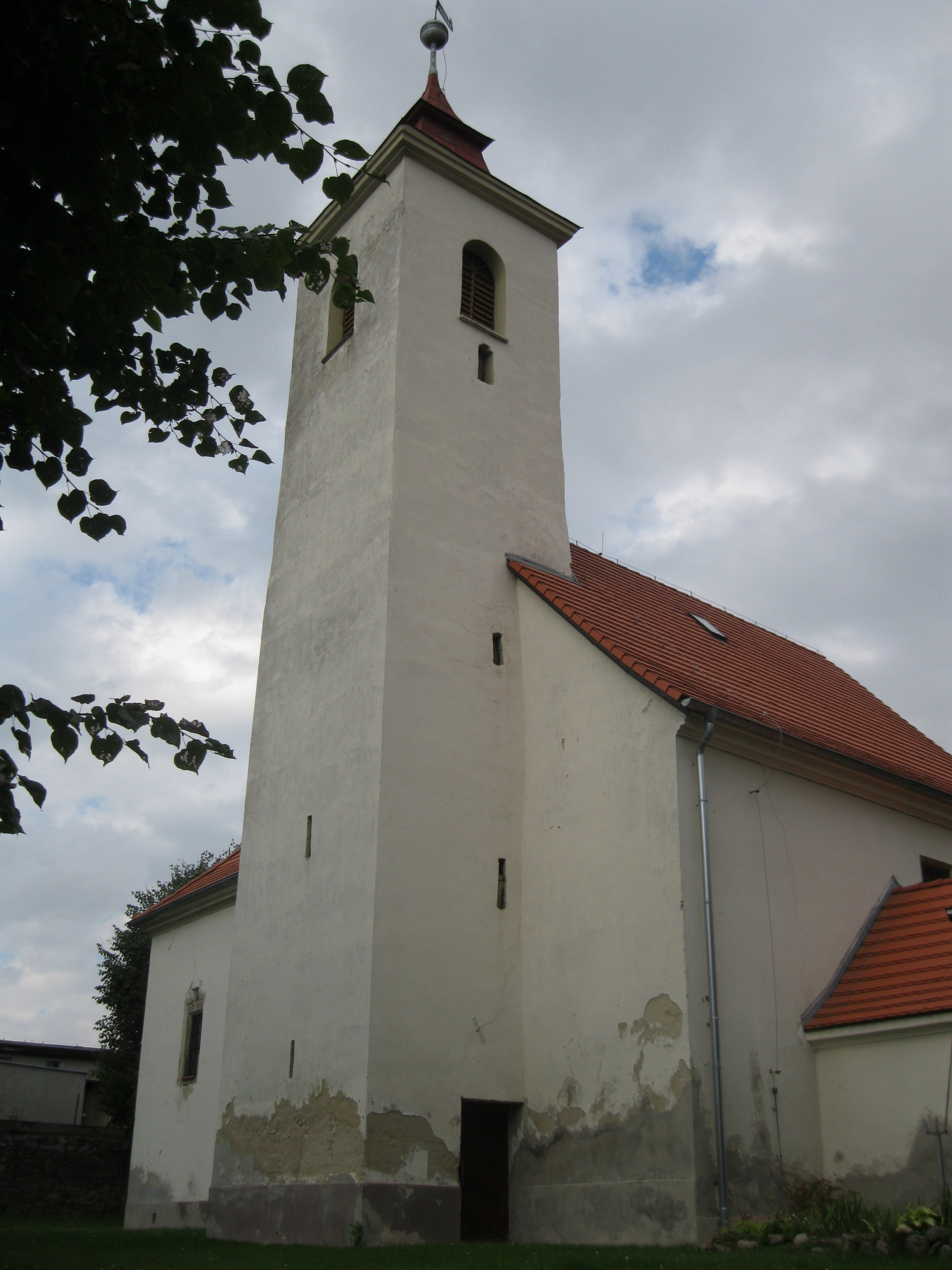
- Church of Saint Hedwig

- Location within Poland
- Coordinates: 50°53′35″N 16°27′49″E
- Country: Poland
- Voivodeship: Lower Silesian
- County: Świdnica
- Gmina: Jaworzyna Śląska
- Time zone: UTC+1 (CET)
  - Summer (DST): UTC+2 (CEST)
- Vehicle registration: DSW

Bolesławice [bɔlɛswaˈvit͡sɛ] is a village in the urban-rural Gmina Jaworzyna Śląska, within Świdnica County, Lower Silesian Voivodeship, in south-western Poland.

== History ==
When it was part of medieval Piast-ruled Poland, in 1193, the tithe from Bolesławice was granted to the Canons Regular Monastery in Wrocław. The name of the village is of Polish origin and comes from the Polish male given name Bolesław.
