= Stary Jaworów =

- Village
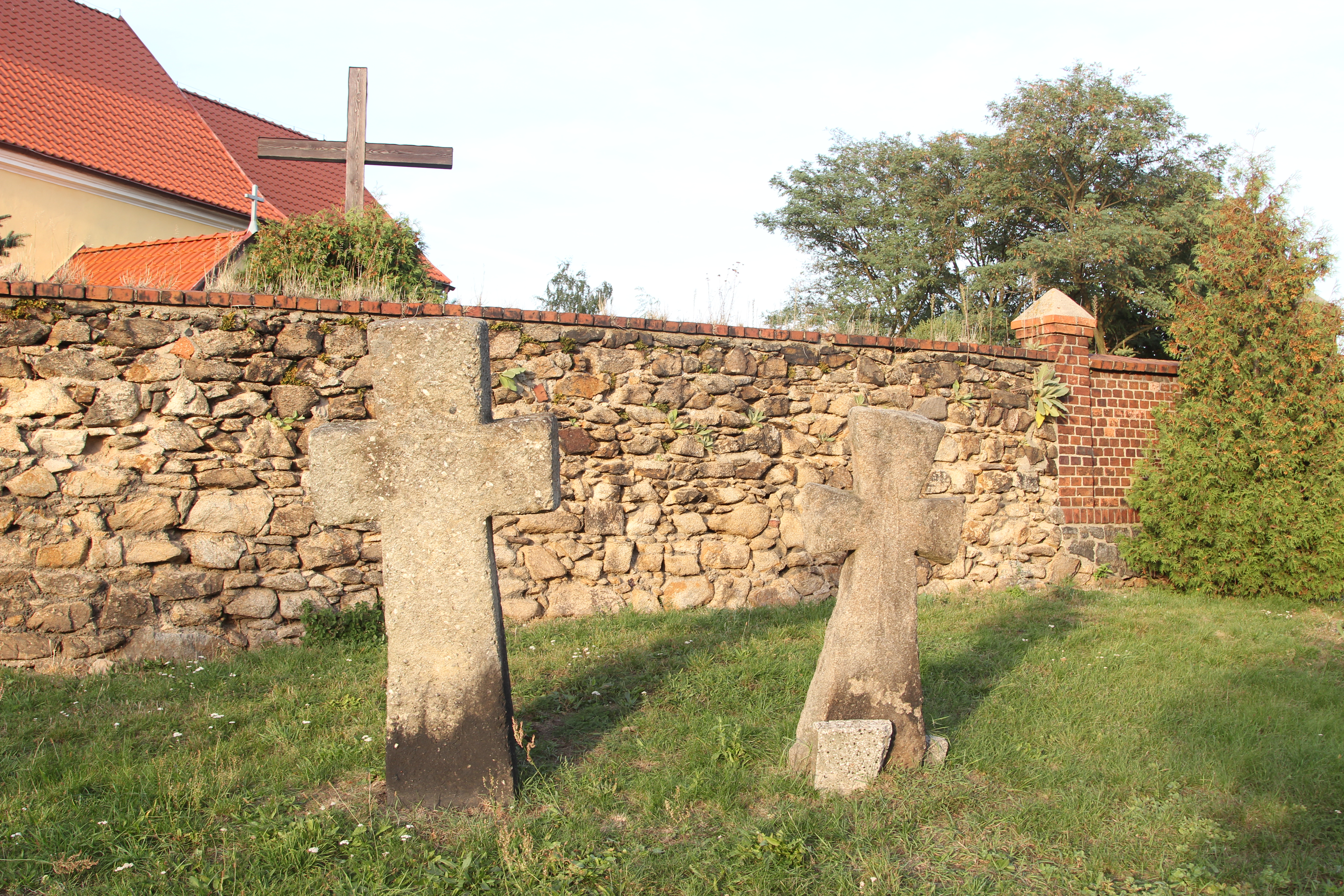
- Stone crosses at the church

- Location within Poland
- Coordinates: 50°53′27″N 16°25′54″E
- Country: Poland
- Voivodeship: Lower Silesian
- County: Świdnica
- Gmina: Jaworzyna Śląska

Stary Jaworów [ˈstarɨ jaˈvɔruf] is a village in the urban-rural Gmina Jaworzyna Śląska, within Świdnica County, Lower Silesian Voivodeship, in south-western Poland.
