= Deutz OMZ 122 R =

German shunting diesel locomotive

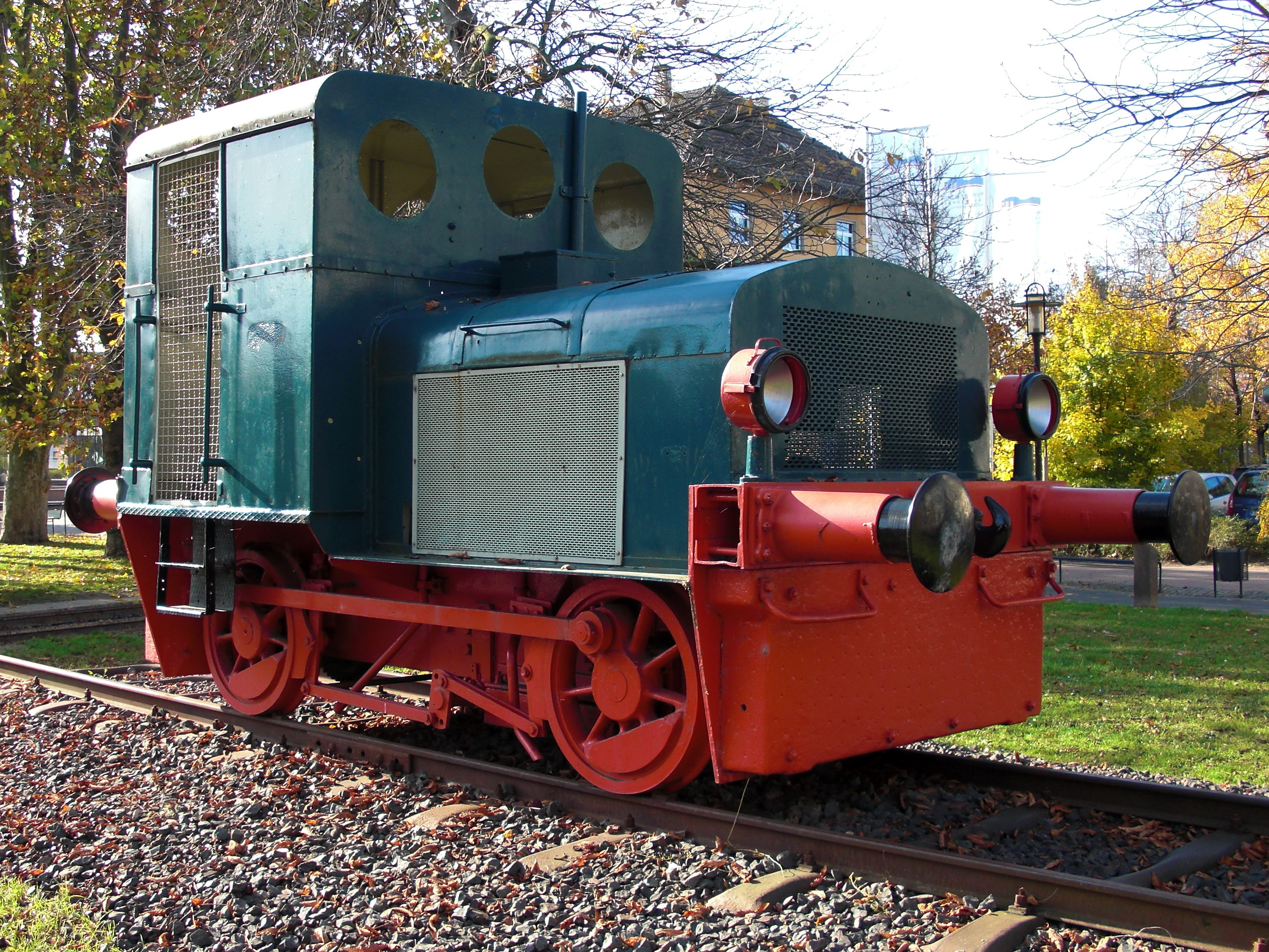
- Deutz 11737/1934 plinthed in Frankenthal
Type and origin
- Power type: Diesel-mechanical
- Builder: Deutz
- Build date: 1932 - 1942
- Total produced: 176
Specifications
- Configuration
  - AAR: B
  - UIC: B
- Gauge: 1,435 mm (4 ft 8 1/2 in)
- Wheel diameter: 850 mm (33.465 in)
- Wheelbase: 2,500 mm (98.425 in)
- Length: 5,420 mm (213.386 in)
- Width: 2,550 mm (100.394 in)
- Height: 2,980 mm (117.323 in)
- Axle load: 8 t
- Loco weight: 16 t
- Fuel type: Diesel
- Fuel capacity: 25 l
- Prime mover: OMZ 122
- RPM
  - Maximum RPM: 600 rpm
- Engine type: Two-stroke diesel engine
- Cylinders: 2
- Transmission: mechanical
- Train brakes: mechanical brakes
- Couplers: Screw coupler
Performance figures
- Maximum speed: 13 km/h (8 mph)
- Power output: 29.5 kW (39.6 hp)
Career
- Disposition: 30 preserved, remainder scrapped

Deutz OMZ 122 R is a German diesel-mechanical shunter locomotive built between 1932 and 1942 by Klöckner-Humboldt-Deutz AG in Cologne, Germany (most likely in the Third Reich). These locomotives were assigned to operate lightweight shunting duties around industrial areas. The first production series of the locomotives designated 10000-27999 were built between 1932 and 1940, and the second production series of the locomotives designated 33000-42999 were built between 1940 and 1942. 176 of the locomotives were built.

The Deutz OMZ 122 R series with 176 built examples is one of the most sold locomotives of the Deutz OM series, and also one of the long lived locomotive series.

== Design ==
The locomotive frame is made of 4 mm steel sheets, it had installed reinforced headstocks with two shaft buffers and a spring-loaded pulling hooks. The axle box cutouts was made in the locomotive's frame, in which the sliding axle bearings were embedded for two wheel sets, it was individually spring-loaded using flat springs. The body is made of welded and riveted steel sheets, the locomotive has an engine compartment and a single driver's cab.

They have a stem for the engine and a cab, similar to the DR Kleinlokomotive class I. The semi-circular shape of the stem and the three round cab windows in the front and rear are the features of the Deutz locomotives.

The locomotive has a 2-cylinder upright two-stroke OMZ 122 diesel engine made by Deutz capable of reaching 42 horsepower at 800 rpm, which drives a mechanical transmission and a 4-geared gearbox with a reversible transmission through a multi-plate clutch. The drive axle is driven by the transmission output through a chain and the drive of the other axle is connected with a coupling rod. The locomotive has headlights powered by electricity with a voltage of 12 volts. The locomotive's brake pads were braked inwardly with an angle lever approximately in the center of the locomotive. They were able to operate at very low speed of half step speed, reaching the maximum speed of 13 km/h (8 mph).

The locomotive design made it possible to save space, and the smoothness to run is also increased compared to vehicles with a blind shaft.

== Variants ==
The OMZ 122 R locomotive belongs to the OM series from Deutz, which included numerous versions with different motorizations for different track widths. For example, there is a feldbahn variant which is OMZ 122 F (F stands for feldbahn), it was built in 1935, its track gauge is 600 mm, it has a 36-horsepower crude oil engine, which was started by compressed air, and its total weight is 7.8 tons. Its total length is 3800 mm long, total width is 1600 mm wide and total height is 2600 mm high. The wheelbase is 1150 mm, and the maximum speed is 17.5 km/h (10 mph).

There is a meter gauge variant, which is Deutz OMZ 122 meterspur, which was built for the meter gauge railway between 1937 and 1941, 62 examples were built. They were withdrawn in 1982 and only two locomotives are preserved today.

During World War II, due to the fuel shortage, some of the locomotives were converted to wood and gas firing, as the fuel was mostly used by the military.

A Polish variant Fablok 8DL was made in 1939. The OMZ 122 R documentation was purchased by Fablok, the design was modified and the components built in Poland were added, which was slightly smaller and lighter than the original German design. The prototype of the locomotive was completed in September, but the tests were interrupted by the outbreak of the war.

== Service ==
OMZ 122 R locomotives entered service in 1932, they were assigned to operate lightweight shunting duties around industrial areas owned by industrial railways such as oil refineries, machine works, steelworks, sugar mills and paper mills. They also worked on areas before Poland annexed them, such as in Danzig and Silesia. Some of the examples were used as military locomotives, they served in World War II of which most of them were part of Wehrmacht high command army and some of the locomotives worked at aircraft manufacturing plants for Luftwaffe.

Many of the locomotives were destroyed in the war, and the remaining locomotives continued their service after the war, operating in the separated countries (East Germany and West Germany). Some of the locomotives were withdrawn from service in the 1960s - 1980s, replaced by the newer shunter locomotives. The last locomotives of the series operated to the 1990s, and the last ever locomotive to be withdrawn was 14652/1935, which ended its service in 2002. Some of the locomotives were preserved as monuments or railway museum exhibits today.

== Preservation ==
There are 30 locomotives either preserved at museums or plinthed as monuments.

| Locomotive number | Location of preservation | Build date | Retire date | Status | Notes |
|---|---|---|---|---|---|
| 33013 | Lokpark Braunschweig | 1940 | 1977 | Preserved | |
| 33114 | Marxzell Vehicle Museum | 1940 | | Preserved | |
| 36831 | Darmstadt-Kranichstein Railway Museum | 1940 | 1951 | Preserved | |
| 42990 | Historical locomotive shed in Wittenberge | 1942 | 1960 | Preserved | |
| 46452 | Initiative Sächsische Eisenbahngeschichte e.V., Dresden-Friedrichstadt | 1942 | | Preserved | |
| 11788 | Sigmundsherberg Railway Museum | 1934 | 1994 | Preserved | |
| 12638 | Selb-Rehau Model and Railway Club | 1934 | | Preserved | |
| 17225 | Schlaitz, Heide-Camp | 1937 | | Monument | |
| 20038 | Kerzers-Kalinach Railway Museum | 1939 | 1988 | Preserved | |
| 21500 | Centre Culturel Sientifique in Lorraine | 1938 | 1993 | Preserved | |
| 22972 | Traditional community 50 3708–0 in Blackenburg | 1938 | 1990 | Preserved | |
| 23041 | LWL-Industriemuseum | 1938 | 1989 | Preserved | |
| 26181 | Binos | 1939 | 1997 | Preserved | |
| 26182 | Förderverein Wupperschiene | 1939 | 1986 | Preserved | |
| 27356 | Technik Museum Sinsheim | 1940 | 1995 | Preserved | |
| 33124 | Silesian Railway Museum | 1940 | 1994 | Preserved | This locomotive is not the OMZ 122, it is OMZ 117 R. Despite being similar to OMZ 122 R locomotives, it was redesignated to 122, its numbering still remains. |

=== Osthannoversche Eisenbahnen DL 0605 ===
As an example of a CV, the example numbered 42990 at Osthannover Railway is to be refurbished here.

The locomotive was delivered to the Rheinisch-Westfälische Wasserwerksgesellschaft in 1942. In 1960 it was passed on to the Osthannoversche Eisenbahnen, where it became the smallest locomotive in the fleet. After the locomotive was bought, the engine was replaced by a new three-cylinder diesel engine designated A3L514. The water cooling system was replaced by air cooling system. The locomotive weight was reduced to 10 tons.

The locomotive was assigned to operate station shunting duties at Amelinghausen station until 1988, where it was then stored in Bleckede. After 1995, the locomotive was transferred the former Salzwedel railway museum, where it was used for shunting service. After the museum was dissolved in 2012, the locomotive was transferred to the Historical locomotive shed in Wittenberge.

== Preserved narrow gauge examples ==
=== 16373/1936 ===
The Frankfurter Feldbahn-Museum (FFM) has a locomotive OMZ 122 F (V 22) with a track gauge of 600 mm. It was delivered in 1936 numbered 16373. Originally at Nuremberg, it service lasted 26 years from 1955 to 1981 at a gravel plant near Gudow. The locomotive was transferred to the Britzer Museum Railway, and then to the FFM in 2009. Another locomotive from the gravel plant came via the same route to the Feld- und Kleinbahn Betriebsgesellschaft in Bad Malente. As of today the locomotive continues to operate feldbahn service at Verde-Walsrode Railway.

=== 13644/1935 ===
The locomotive was delivered to the customer Deutsche Tiefbau Ges.mbG in 1935, where it operated for 33 years, from 1935 to 1968. After 1968, the locomotive was transferred to H. Vatter company, where it operated at a quarry/porphyry plant in Dossenheim, it was numbered as Lok 7. The locomotive was then retired in 1974. In August 2004, it was bought by the private collection of P. Speyer and was Transported to Wiesloch Feldbahn and the industrial museum. The locomotive remains as an exhibit today.
