= Witków, Świdnica County =

Witków
- Village
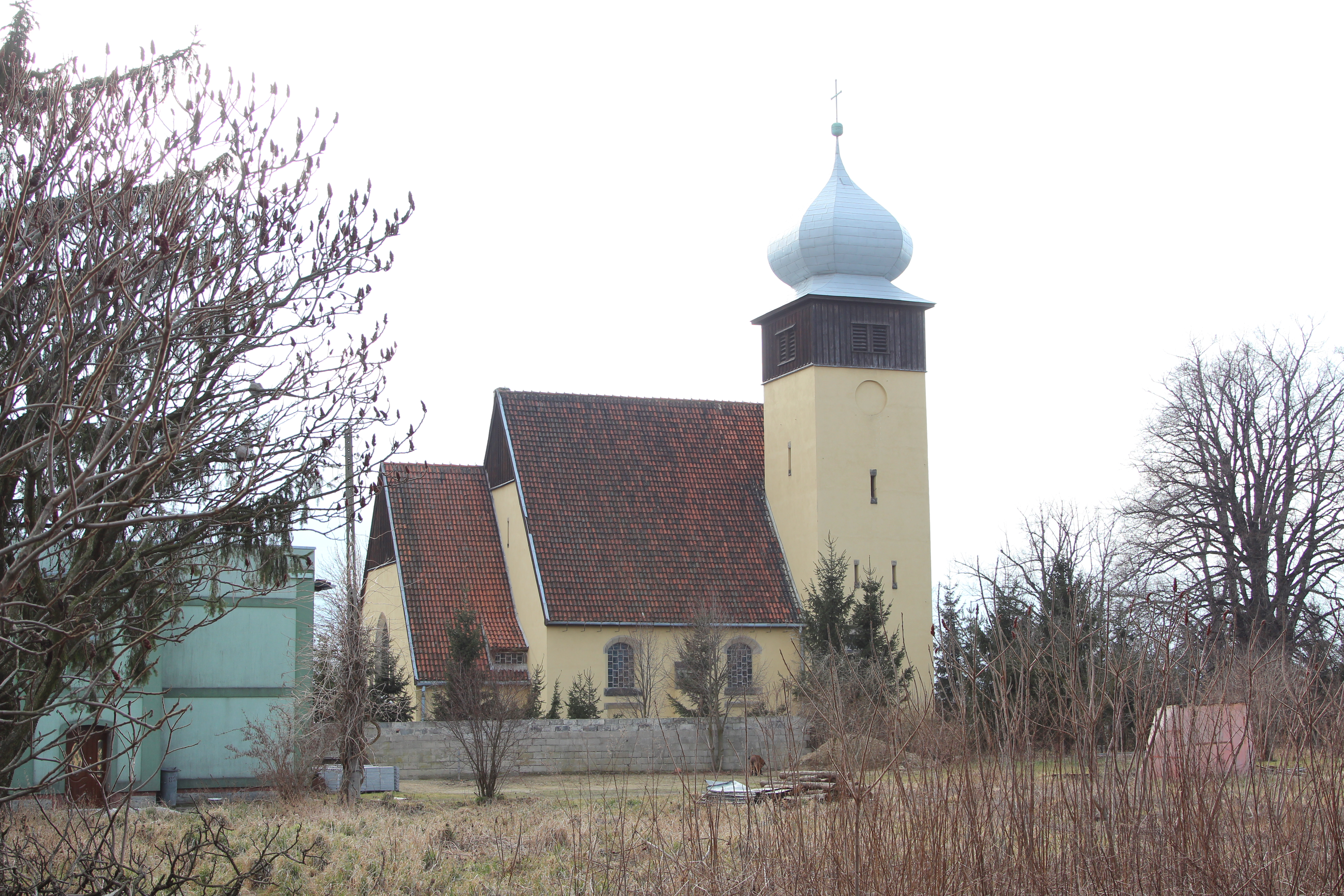
- Church of Our Lady of Fatima

- Location within Poland
- Coordinates: 50°54′N 16°26′E
- Country: Poland
- Voivodeship: Lower Silesian
- County: Świdnica
- Gmina: Jaworzyna Śląska

Witków [ˈvitkuf] is a village in the urban-rural Gmina Jaworzyna Śląska, within Świdnica County, Lower Silesian Voivodeship, in south-western Poland.
