= Gmina Jaworzyna Śląska =

Gmina Jaworzyna Śląska Jaworzyna Śląska Commune
- Gmina
- Flag Coat of arms
- Interactive map of Gmina Jaworzyna Śląska
- Coordinates (Jaworzyna Śląska): 50°55′N 16°26′E
- Country: Poland
- Voivodeship: Lower Silesian
- County: Świdnica
- Seat: Jaworzyna Śląska

Area
  - Total: 67.34 km^{2} (26.00 sq mi)

Population (2019-06-30)
  - Total: 10,249
  - Density: 152.2/km^{2} (394.2/sq mi)
  - Urban: 5,124
  - Rural: 5,125
- Website: https://www.jaworzyna.net/

Gmina Jaworzyna Śląska is an urban-rural gmina (administrative district) in Świdnica County, Lower Silesian Voivodeship, in south-western Poland. Its seat is the town of Jaworzyna Śląska, which lies approximately 9 kilometres (6 mi) north of Świdnica, and 49 kilometres (30 mi) south-west of the regional capital Wrocław.

The gmina covers an area of 67.34 square kilometres (26.0 sq mi), and as of 2019 its total population is 10,249.

== Naming ==
In the year 1761, during the Seven Years' War, Frederick the Great went into an entrenched mount guard (entrenched camp) close to Bolesławice (de:Bunzelwitz). With 50,000 troops he was up against 132,000 allied Austrian and Russian troops. During the Camp of Bunzelwitz King Frederick II was staying in a tent (de:Zelt). In order to remember to this campaign, the later close to that area established railway station was named Koenigszelt (en: King's tent, today Jaworzyna Śląska). In memory to the Camp of Bunzelwitz there was a memorial stone on the northern end of the station.

== Neighbouring gminas ==
Gmina Jaworzyna Śląska is bordered by the towns of Świdnica and Świebodzice, and the gminas of Strzegom, Świdnica and Żarów.

== Villages ==
Apart from the town of Jaworzyna Śląska, the gmina contains the villages of Bagieniec, Bolesławice, Czechy, Milikowice, Nowice, Nowy Jaworów, Pasieczna, Pastuchów, Piotrowice Świdnickie, Stary Jaworów, Tomkowa and Witków.

== Twin towns – sister cities ==
Gmina Jaworzyna Śląska is twinned with:

- Ostritz, Germany
- Peyremale, France
- Pfeffenhausen, Germany
- Teplice nad Metují, Czech Republic
