= Silesian Railway Museum =

Railway museum in Jaworzyna Śląska, Poland

- Muzeum Kolejnictwa na Śląsku

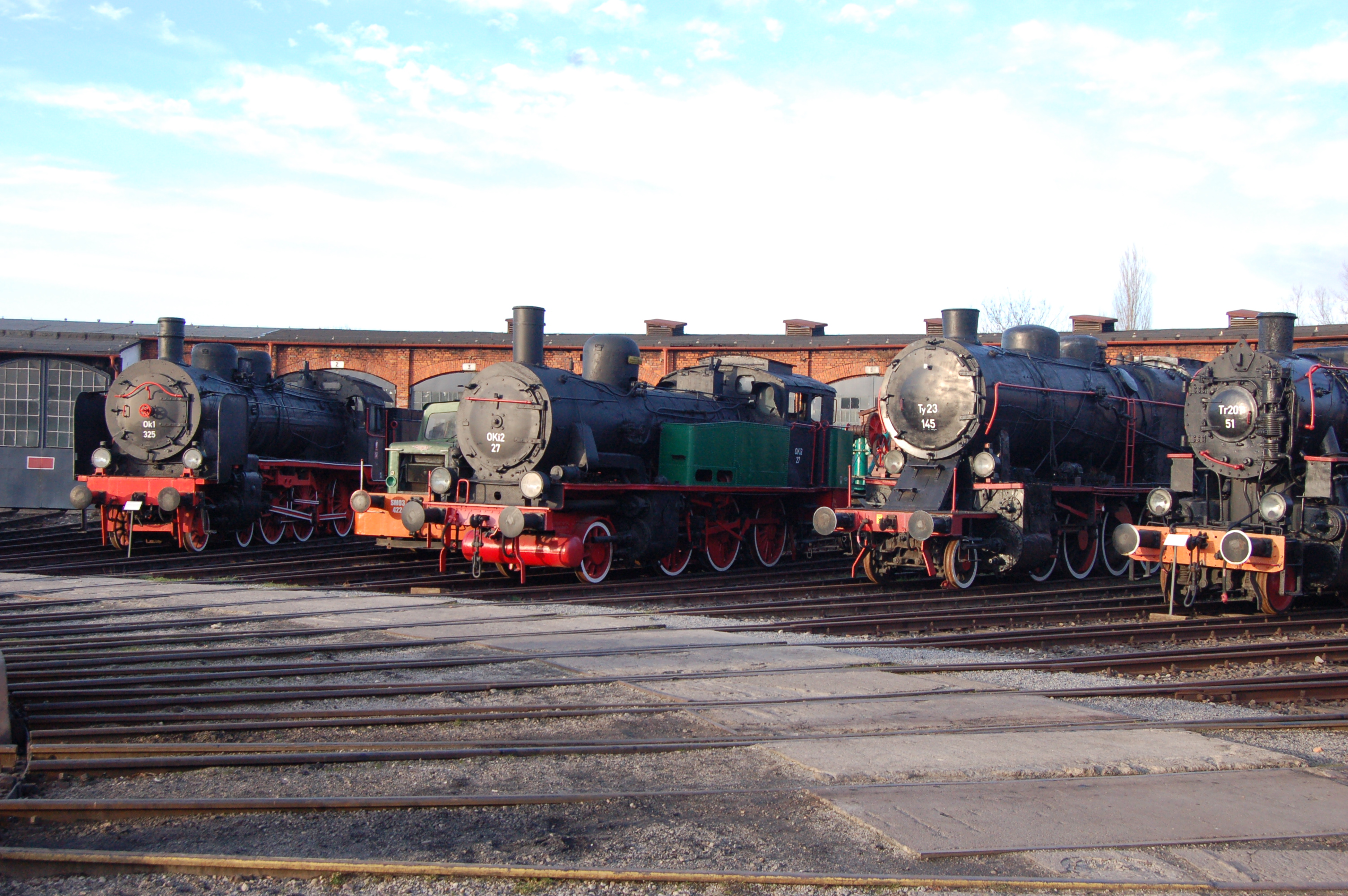
- Locomotive roundhouse

- Location within Poland Location within Lower Silesian Voivodeship
- Location: 4 Towarowa street, Jaworzyna Śląska, Lower Silesia, Poland
- Coordinates: 50°54′56.3″N 16°26′12.5″E
- Type: Railway museum
- Website: muzeumkolejnictwa.pl

Silesian Railway Museum (Polish: Muzeum Kolejnictwa na Śląsku) is an open-air railway museum in Jaworzyna Śląska, Lower Silesia, Poland.

The museum has the largest collection of rolling stock in Poland, consisting of over 150 railway vehicles ranging from the late 19th century to the 1970s. This includes the collection of 39 steam, diesel, and electric locomotives of German, Polish, American and British production, over 60 carriages, as well as specialized rail vehicles.

The museum covers 2 hectares (4.9 acres) and is located in the grounds of the former locomotive depot in Jaworzyna Śląska, which opened in 1908.

== History ==
The idea of turning active locomotion yard into railway museum emerged into early 90s. That decision was based on the fact, that until tat period several steam engines remained in service andd to honor the 150th amniversary of railways in Poland. First museum was opened in 1991 by Polish State Railways (PKP). Opening initiated process of gathering heritage equipment and rolling stock from various sources. Due to the financial problems of PKP, the old museum was closed in early 21st century.

The current museum was founded in 2004, after few years of efforts to save the collection of steam locomotives and gathered in Jaworzyna Śląska, the museum leased the area together with the exhibits from Gmina Jaworzyna Śląska. The collection of exhibits taken over from PKP consisted of 34 locomotives, 41 wagons and 8 workshop machines. Since then, the museum has been operating under the supervision of the Ministry of Culture and National Heritage. In 2016, the museum became a branch of the Foundation for the Protection of the Industrial Heritage of Silesia.

For over 20 years of operating, it created one of the largest collections of rolling stock and railway equipment in Poland. It was one of the few institutions in the country owning functional steam locomotives, such as the TKt48-18, built in 1951 and used in 2006–2020. Museum properties were used in various events and movie productions. Exhibits and area are being conserved regularly maintained and conserved.

== Preserved rolling stock ==
- TKt48
- Ty2
- Ty42
- Tr201
- Tr203
- Pt47
- OKi2
- Tr7
- Ty45
- Ty23
- TKB/B
- SM03, 409Da
- Ol49
- SM41
- ST43
- TKi3
- EU04
- EP23
- TY51
- 410D
- Ty246
- TKP Śląsk
- SA102
- SM30
- SN81
- TKh2
- Tp2
- OKl2
- Ok1
- Ok22
- Pt31
- Ls40
