= Jaworzyna Śląska =

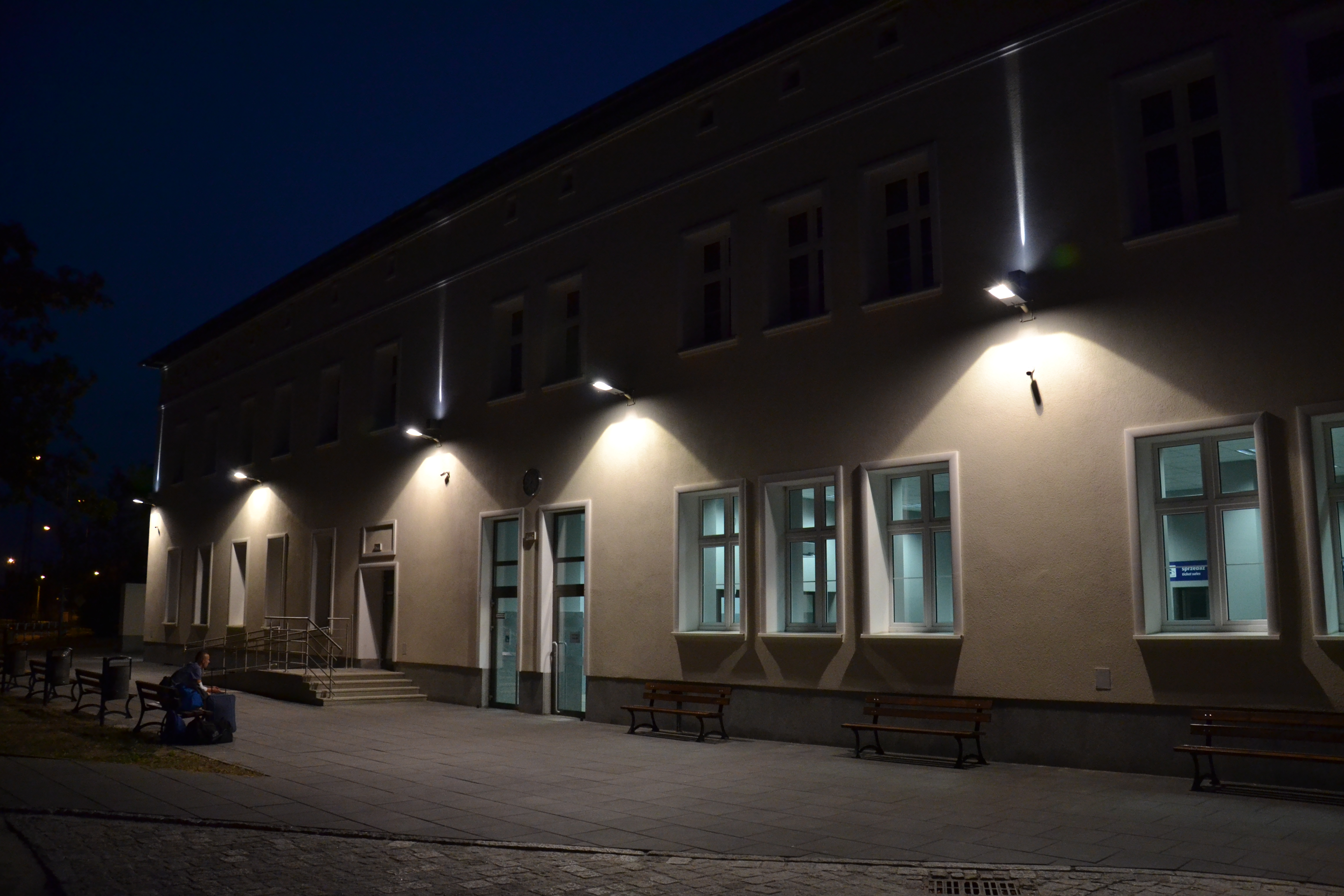
- Railway station

- Flag Coat of arms

- Location within Poland
- Coordinates: 50°55′N 16°26′E
- Country: Poland
- Voivodeship: Lower Silesian
- County: Świdnica
- Gmina: Jaworzyna Śląska
- Town rights: 1954

Area
  - Total: 4.34 km^{2} (1.68 sq mi)
- Highest elevation: 238 m (781 ft)
- Lowest elevation: 220 m (720 ft)

Population (2019-06-30)
  - Total: 5,124
  - Density: 1,180/km^{2} (3,060/sq mi)
- Time zone: UTC+1 (CET)
  - Summer (DST): UTC+2 (CEST)
- Postal code: 58-140
- Area code: (+48) 74
- Vehicle registration: DSW
- Website: https://www.jaworzyna.net

Jaworzyna Śląska [javɔˈʐɨna ˈɕlɔ̃ska] (German: Königszelt) is a town in Świdnica County, Lower Silesian Voivodeship, in south-western Poland. It is the seat of the administrative district (gmina) called Gmina Jaworzyna Śląska. The town is located within the historic region of Lower Silesia.

In 2019, the town had a population of 5,124.

== Transport ==
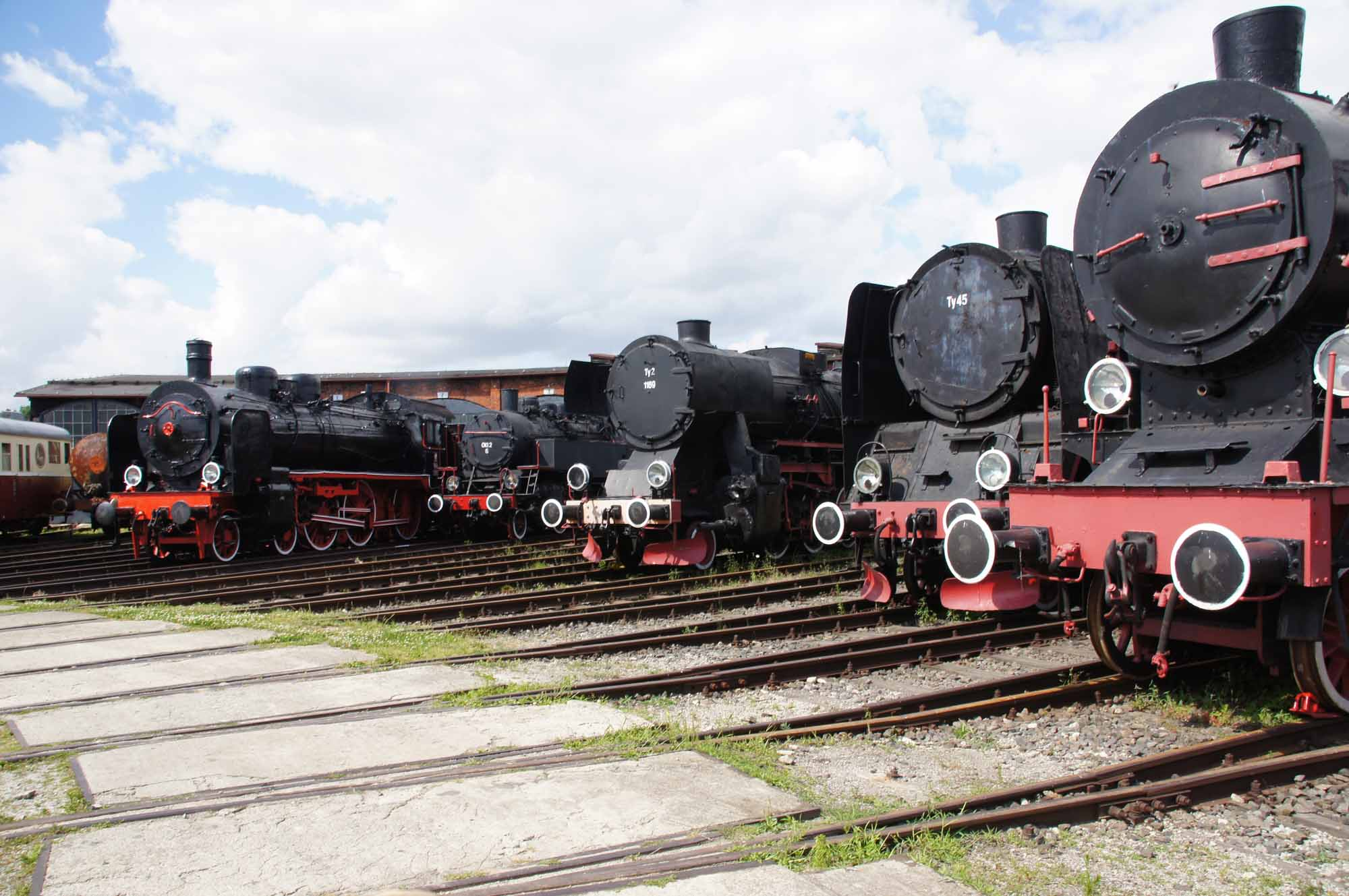
Museum of Railway in Silesia

Jaworzyna Śląska railway station, an important railway junction, located along the major line from Wrocław to Wałbrzych. In Jaworzyna, this line crosses with less important connections to Strzegom and Kamieniec Ząbkowicki.

The Museum of Railway in Silesia (Muzeum Kolejnictwa na Śląsku) is located in Jaworzyna Śląska.

== Economy ==
A large porcelain factory is the town's largest employer.

== Notable people ==
- Tadeusz Mytnik (born 1949), Polish cyclist, 1975 Tour de Pologne winner
- Gustav Schubert (1916–1945), Luftwaffe pilot

== Twin towns – sister cities ==
See twin towns of Gmina Jaworzyna Śląska.
