= Janów-Nikiszowiec =

- Katowice District
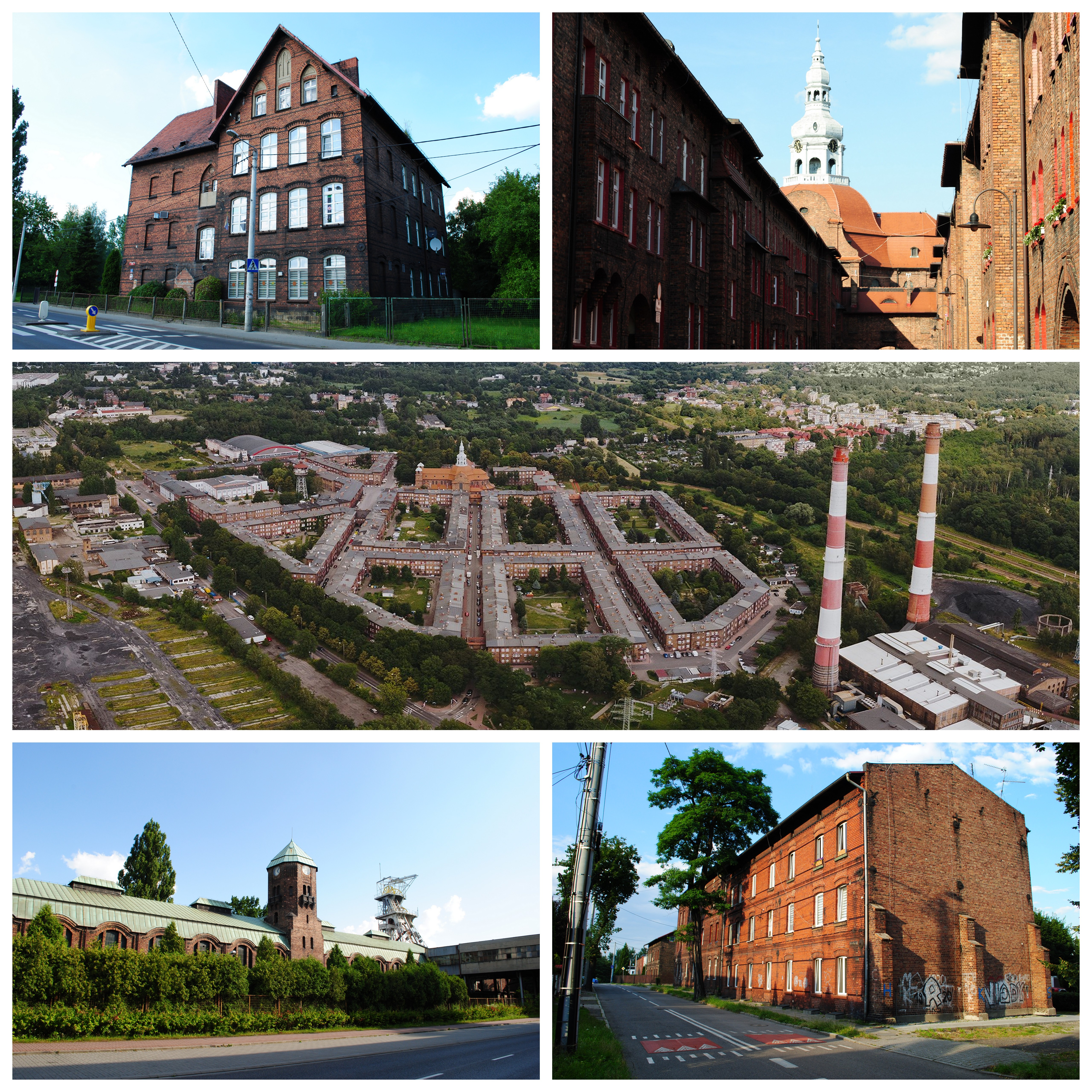
- Building of Municipal Kindergarten No. 62 on Oswobodzenia Street; St. Anne Street with the spire of the Church of St. Anne visible; a general view of the Nikiszowiec housing estate (in the foreground) and Janów (in the background); the Pułaski shaft of the Wieczorek Coal Mine; Leśnego Potoku Street

- Location of Janów-Nikiszowiec within Katowice
- Coordinates: 50°14′36″N 19°05′14″E
- Country: Poland
- Voivodeship: Silesian
- County/City: Katowice
- Established: 1 January 1992

Area
  - Total: 8.65 km^{2} (3.34 sq mi)
- Elevation: 255–305 m (837–1,001 ft)

Population (2019)
  - Total: 9,337
  - Density: 1,080/km^{2} (2,800/sq mi)
- Time zone: UTC+1 (CET)
  - Summer (DST): UTC+2 (CEST)
- Area code: (+48) 032

Janów-Nikiszowiec (German: Janow-Nickischschacht) is a district of Katowice, located in the eastern part of the city, within the group of eastern districts, along the Bolina river. It encompasses a significant portion of the former Gmina Janów (excluding Giszowiec), comprising: Janów, Kolonia Wysockiego, Nikiszowiec, Stawiska (southern part), and the Nowy Nikiszowiec housing estate, and in the past also the Amanda Colony and Huta Arnold.

Since its foundation in the 18th century until the Industrial Revolution, Janów was associated with the Mieroszewski family, and later with the Tiel-Winckler family. In the first half of the 19th century, industrial development began in the present-day district, accompanied by the establishment of new company-owned colonies, including Amanda and Zuzanna (near the coal mines) and Arnold (near the zinc smelter). From the second half of the 19th century, Janów-Nikiszowiec was closely associated with the Georg von Giesches Erben concern, company, which in 1883 merged numerous small mines into one larger one – Giesche Coal Mine (now Wieczorek Coal Mine). Along with its development, a new housing estate for the mine workers – Nikiszowiec – was built between 1908 and 1919, and after World War II, Kolonia Wysockiego. On 9 May 1924, Nikiszowiec was incorporated into Gmina Janów. In 1951, the gmina was merged with Szopienice, and on 31 December 1959 with Katowice.

The district has a diverse functional and spatial structure, dominated by residential and industrial uses, but also with a well-developed service and tourism sector (mainly in Nikiszowiec). The northern and southern boundaries of the district are marked by two major roads – national road 79 (Bagienna Street) and the A4 motorway. Several important Katowice roads also run through Janów-Nikiszowiec, including Szopienicka and Oswobodzenia streets. The district has an area of 8.65 km² (5.25% of Katowice's area) and had 11,496 residents in 2007 (3.6% of the city's population).

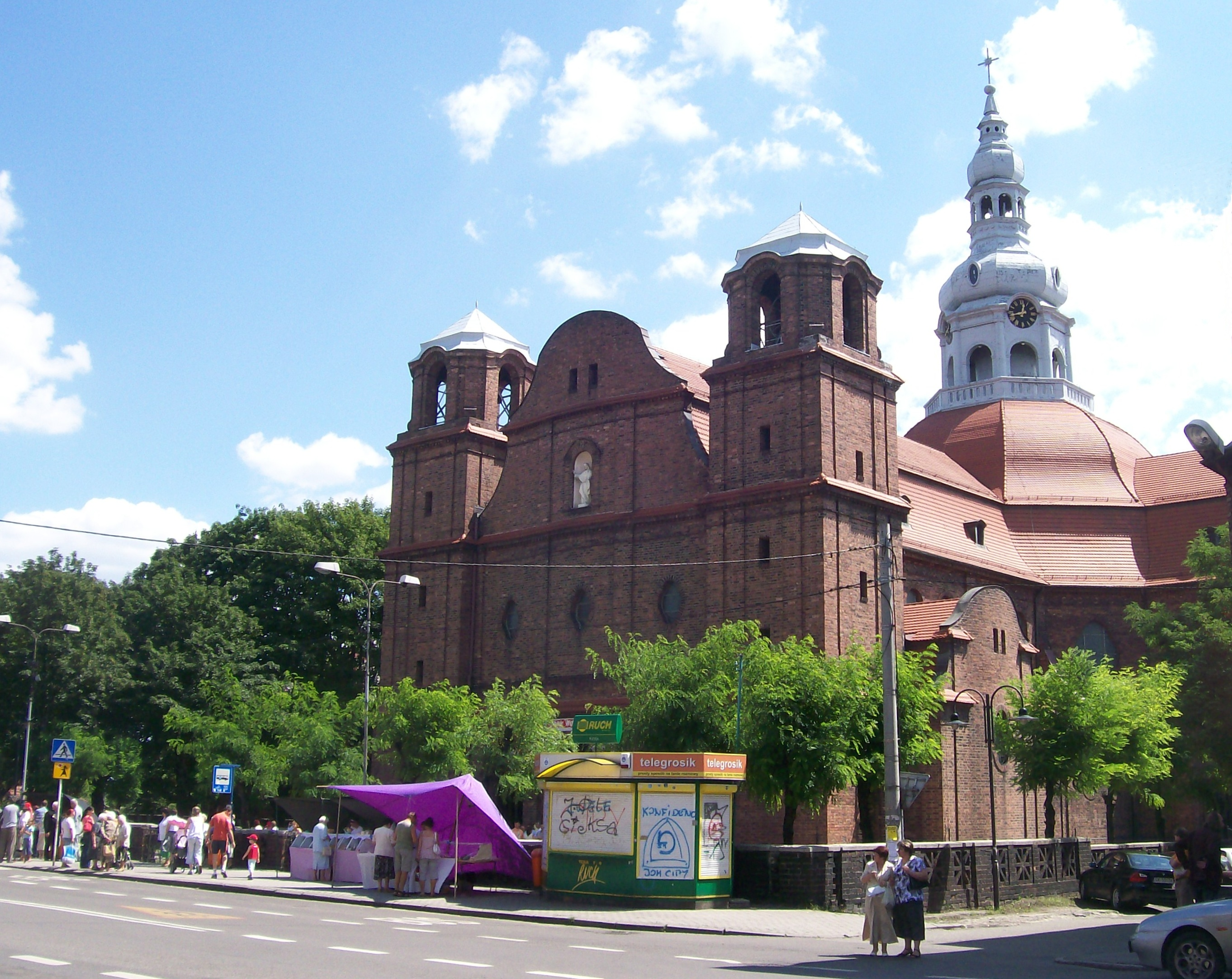
Church of St. Anne in Janów

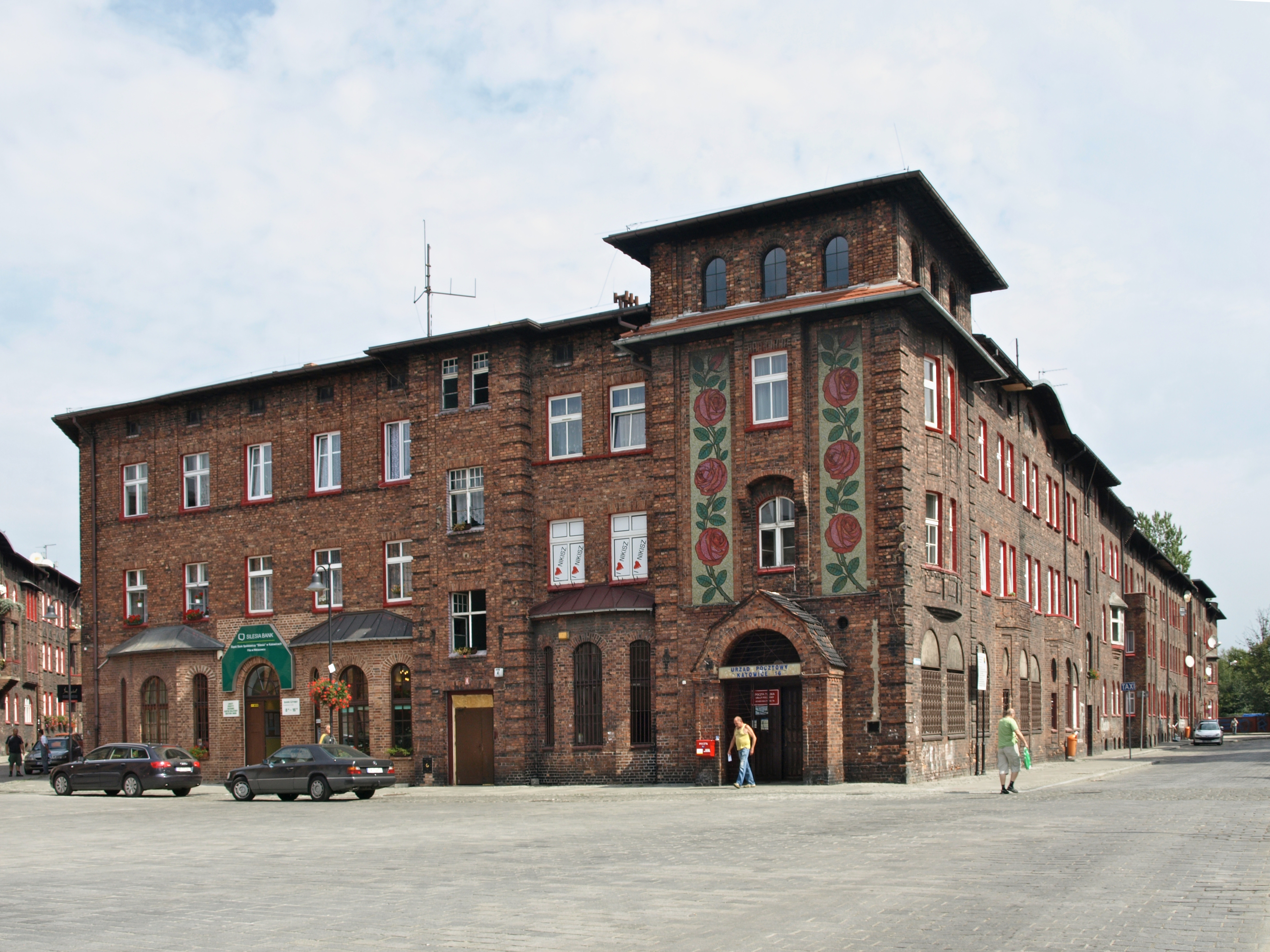
Post office in Nikiszowiec

== Geography ==
=== Location ===
Administratively, Janów-Nikiszowiec is located in the Silesian Voivodeship and is one of the districts of Katowice (no. 16), situated in the eastern part of the city, approximately 7 km east of the city center. It borders Zawodzie and Szopienice-Burowiec to the north, the city of Mysłowice (the districts of Bończyk-Tuwima and Janów Miejski-Ćmok) to the east, Giszowiec to the south, and the district of Osiedle Paderewskiego-Muchowiec to the west. The district's boundaries are:

- to the north – along Kolonia Amandy and Porcelanowa streets, then along the southbound lane of Bagienna Street (national road 79) from the intersection with 1 Maja and Obrońców Westerplatte streets to the intersection with Krakowska Street, and then along that street to the city limits;
- to the east – along the border between Katowice and Mysłowice near the Bolina river;
- to the south – along Mysłowicka Street and then, from the intersection with the A4 motorway, along that road to the Murckowska junction;
- to the west – along Gospodarcza Street and the eastern boundary of the municipal cemetery.

A large part of Janów-Nikiszowiec is located in the Bolina river valley, mainly on its left bank. According to Jerzy Kondracki's physio-geographical regionalization, Janów-Nikiszowiec is located in the Katowice Upland mesoregion, which forms the southern part of the Silesian Upland macroregion. The Silesian Upland itself is a part of the Silesian-Kraków Upland subprovince. Historically, the district forms part of eastern Upper Silesia.

=== Geology ===
In terms of geological structure, Janów-Nikiszowiec is located in the Upper Silesian Sinkhole. The strata filling the sinkhole date from the Upper Carboniferous period and consist of shales, sandstones, and conglomerates with seams of bituminous coal that formed over 300 million years ago. The age of the rock outcrops in Janów-Nikiszowiec is closely linked to the terrain. The Carboniferous rock outcrops, located in the highest parts of Janów-Nikiszowiec, consist mainly of claystones, mudstones, and coal from the Załęże and Orzesze formations; additionally, near Bagienna Street, there are sandstones, conglomerates, and coal from the Siodło formations. South of the areas built on Carboniferous rocks, mainly in the center of Nikiszowiec and Janów, as well as in the area of Kolonia Wysockiego and Leśnego Potoku Street, there are Quaternary formations from the Pleistocene – eluvial deposits of tills. Areas north of Janów consist of fluvioglacial sands and gravels formed during the Riss glaciation in the Neopleistocene. Formations from the same period are also found in the Bolina river valley – postglacial Pleistocene deposits in the form of fluvisols, silts, sands, and river gravels.

=== Terrain ===
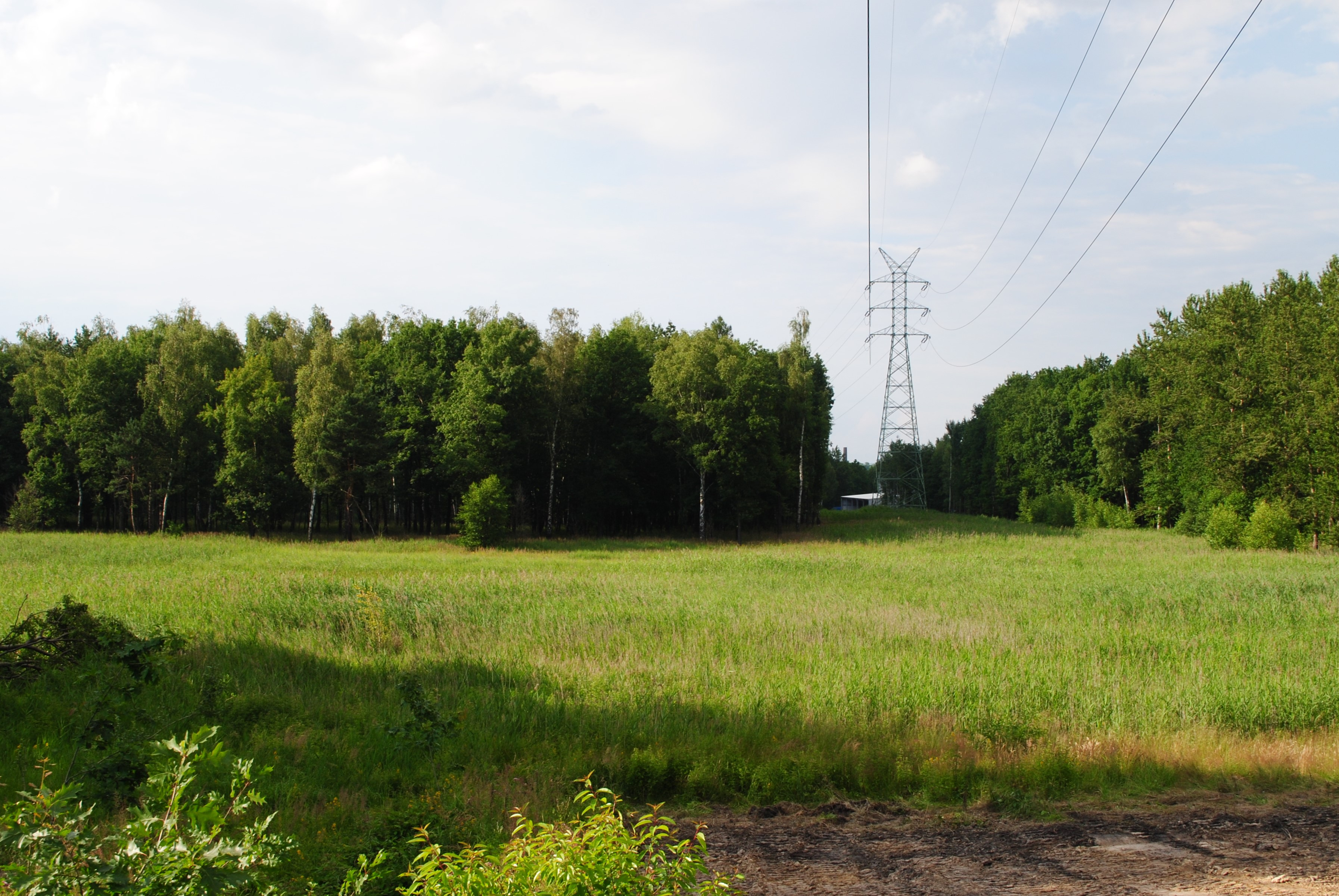
Depression formed as a result of land subsidence north of Nowy Nikiszowiec

In terms of physical-geographical units, Janów-Nikiszowiec is located in the Silesian-Kraków Upland subprovince, within the Silesian Upland, in the southern part of the Katowice Upland mesoregion, while in terms of morphological units, the district is situated mainly on the Murcki Plateau. The northern slopes, descending toward the Rawa Depression, are dissected by two long valleys, including the Bolina flowing through Janów-Nikiszowiec and, in the western parts of the district, the valley of the Leśny Stream. There are large areas of Tertiary denudational flattenings located at elevations above 300 m above sea level. In the district, near Stawiska and Krakowska streets, there is also a section of the Mysłowice Basin. In the area where Janów-Nikiszowiec borders Szopienice-Burówiec and Zawodzie lies the boundary between the Murcki Plateau and the Mysłowice Basin – both part of the Katowice Plateau – and the Rawa Depression, which is part of the Bytom Plateau. The highest point in Janów-Nikiszowiec is Mrówcza Górka, located in the area of Gospodarcza Street. It reaches an elevation of 305.7 m above sea level. The lowest point, however, is located in the Bolina valley near the border with Mysłowice, at an elevation of approximately 253 m above sea level.

The landscape of Janów-Nikiszowiec has undergone significant changes as a result of human economic activity, mainly due to the extraction of raw materials, industrial development, and the construction of transportation infrastructure. In Janów, there are, among other things, former mining dumps, located mostly near the former Amanda Colony, as well as subsidence processes, which have resulted in the formation of, among other things, artificial ponds and water pools in the depressions, including the pool located north of Nowy Nikiszowiec and Trzewiczek Pond.

=== Soils ===
Janów-Nikiszowiec is an area with diverse soil types. The northern part of the district has been heavily impacted by human activity, and as a result, the soils in that area are classified as anthrosols. They are mainly composed of sandstone and sand. These soils are often degraded due to industrial activity and altered as a result of construction development. They are also contaminated with heavy metals. In the higher elevations of Janów-Nikiszowiec, where Carboniferous rock outcrops are present, luvisols have formed. Soils of the same type, but formed from alluvial clays as well as silty and clayey sands, have developed in the lower-lying parts of Janów-Nikiszowiec (mainly in the residential areas of Nikiszowiec and Janów). In the Bolina area, luvisols and brown earth formed from clayey sands have developed. Their pH is mostly acidic or close to neutral. In terms of soil quality classes, the soils in the district are classified as good and average (class III – the Mrówcza Górka area, and class IV – the Nowy Nikiszowiec and Janów areas along the Bolina valley).

=== Climate ===
The climate of Janów-Nikiszowiec does not differ significantly from that of Katowice as a whole, but it is modified by local factors (microclimate). The area has a transitional temperate climate, with oceanic influences predominating over continental ones. Westerly winds dominate (accounting for about 60% of the total), with easterly and southerly winds accounting for a smaller share. The average annual temperature for the 1961–2005 period at the nearby station in Muchowiec is 8.1°C, though the urban heat island effect is also noticeable there, which locally modifies the air temperature. The warmest month is July (17.8°C), and the coldest is January (−2.2°C). The average annual sunshine duration for the 1966–2005 period was 1,474 hours. The average annual precipitation for the 1951–2005 period was 713.8 mm.

=== Surface and groundwater ===
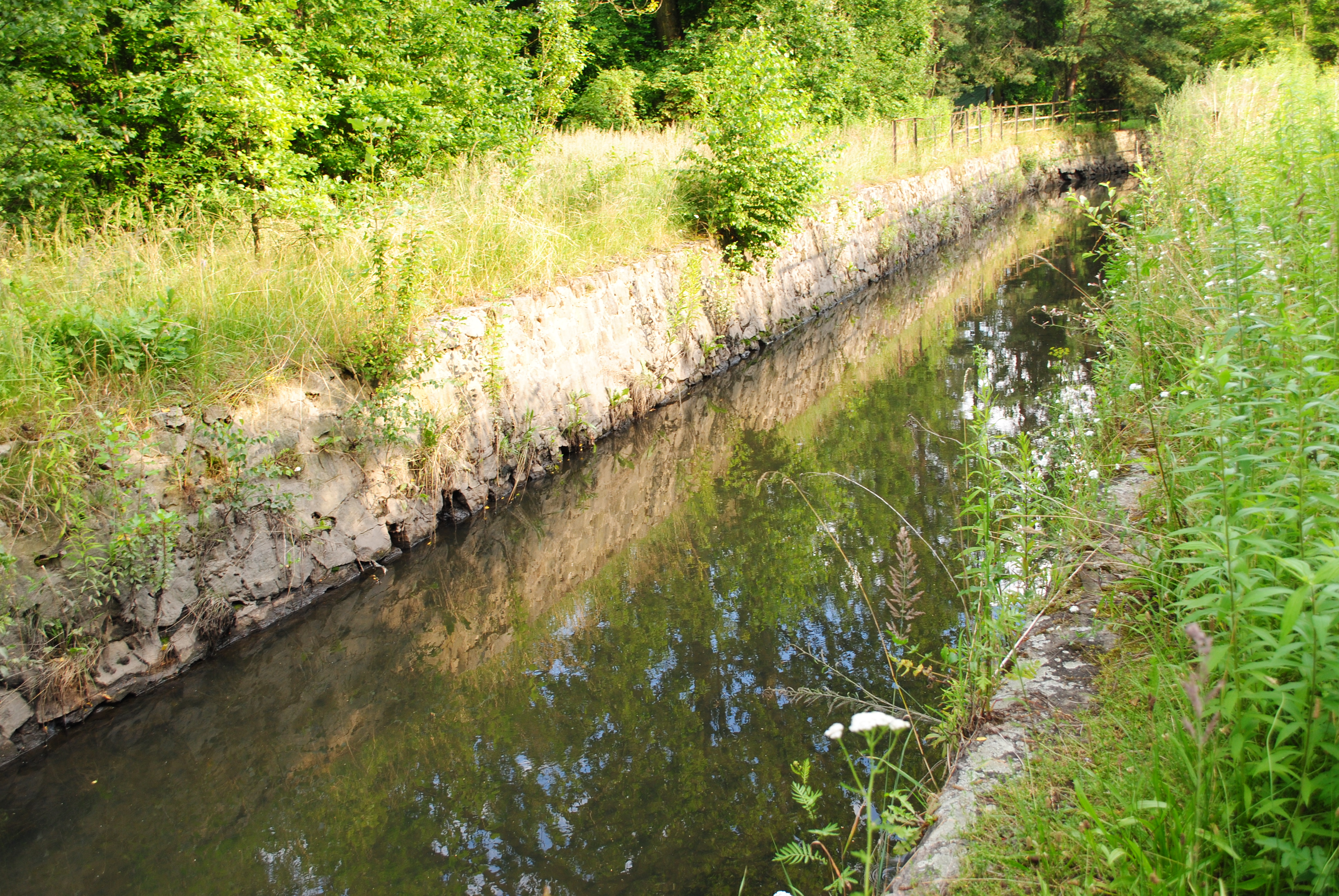
Bolina in the area of Hodowców Street

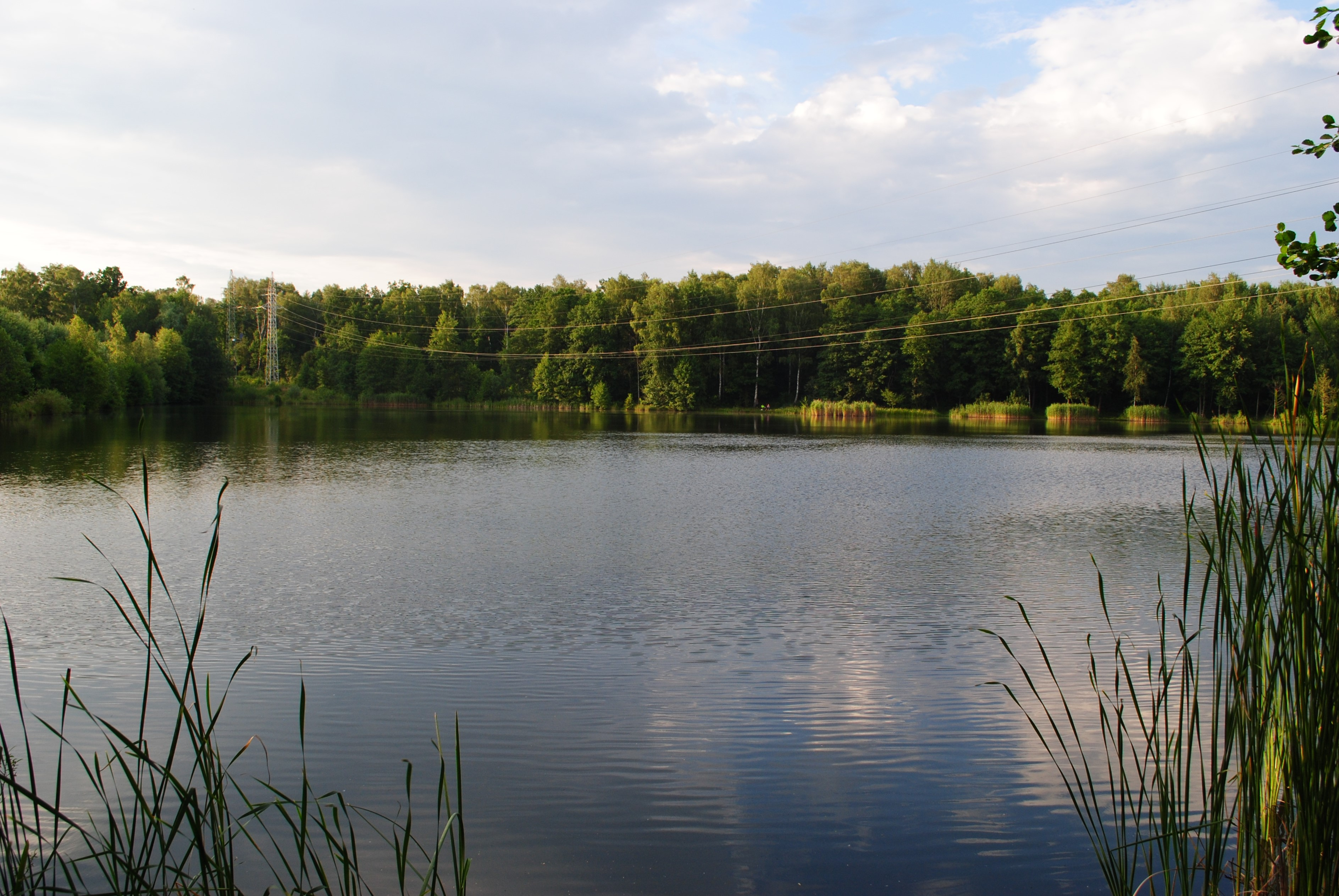
Bolina II Pond

Most of Janów-Nikiszowiec lies within the catchment of the Bolina, which is part of the Vistula drainage basin. Within the district, the Bolina flows northeast and joins the Czarna Przemsza further on in Mysłowice. In terms of water quality, the Bolina river at its confluence with the Czarna Przemsza was classified as Class V in 2006, which represents the lowest water quality class, rendering the water unsuitable for use. The northern part of the district around Porcelanowa Street, the northern slope of Mrówcza Górka, part of Nowy Nikiszowiec, and the vicinity of Upadowy Pond is located in the catchment of the Rawa. A third-order drainage divide runs between the two catchments.

Most of the man-made water bodies are located in the Bolina valley. One pond is located in the Rawa valley, and there are also water bodies in closed basins. The following water bodies are found there:

Name	Area (ha)	Catchment
Bolina Pond	2.75	Bolina
Bolina II Pond	4.21	Bolina
Janów Pond	2.13	closed drainage area
Stawiska, ponds nos. 19.B–D	0.90	Bolina
Stawiska, ponds nos. 19.A and 19.E	0.70	Bolina
Trzewiczek Pond	0.92	closed drainage area
Upadowy Pond	5.52	Rawa

Janów-Nikiszowiec is located within the Silesian-Kraków hydrogeological region. Aquifers are present there in all stratigraphic layers, but their significance depends on geological and hydrogeological factors, as well as human influence. None of the major groundwater reservoirs are found there; instead, the district is covered by groundwater body No. 134. The groundwater balance is significantly influenced by mining activities related to mine dewatering.

=== Nature and environmental protection ===
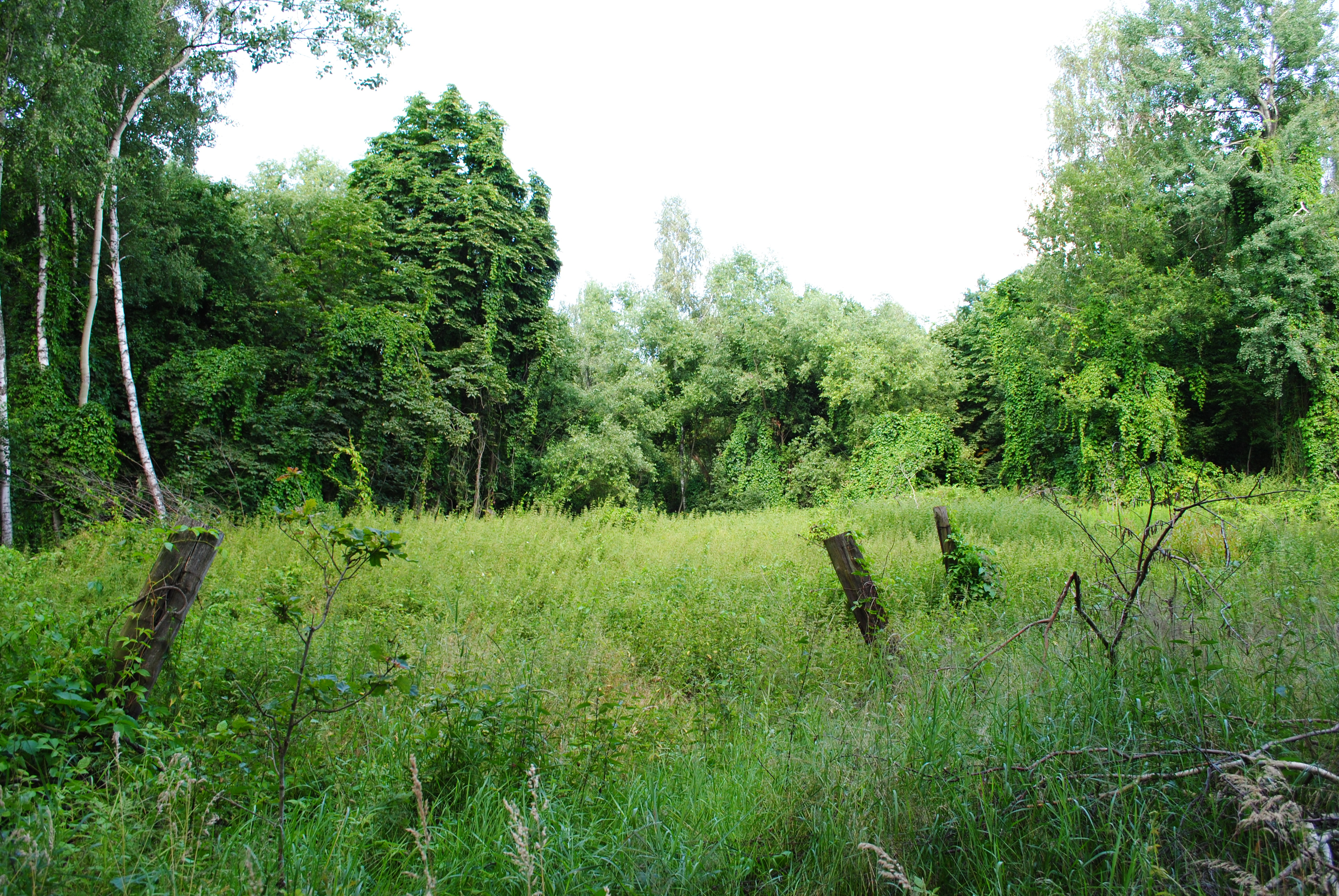
Forest clearing in the area of the former Amanda Colony

Janów-Nikiszowiec is characterized by a significant proportion of green space. The southwestern part of the district was once part of the former Silesian Forest. The Murcki Plateau was originally covered mainly by beech forests and oak-hornbeam forests. River valleys were overgrown with riparian forests. These areas began to undergo transformation with the development of heavy industry in the early 20th century, mainly in the northern regions. Along with the expansion of human activity, changes also occurred in the environment, including the terrain (spoil tips and sinkholes), the hydrological network (e.g., the canalization of rivers and the creation of artificial reservoirs), and the flora and fauna. Some large animals have disappeared from the area (only red deer and wild boars remain), while new species associated with open terrain have appeared. Additionally, non-native plant and animal species have been introduced, some deliberately (mainly fish, bred especially in the Upadowy Pond).

The forests in Janów-Nikiszowiec are managed by the State Forests and administered by the Katowice Forest District's Janów Forestry Division. Its headquarters are located at 95 Leśnego Potoku Street. These forests are concentrated mainly in the northern, western, and southern parts of the district. In the forest stand stretching along the Bolina valley, the dominant species is Scotch pine, though oaks also grow there. Closer to Nikiszowiec, there are alder carrs, as well as ash trees and beeches. In the northern and western parts of the district, the dominant species is silver birch, while in the area of the former Amanda Colony, it is larch, elderberry, aspen, and alder buckthorn.

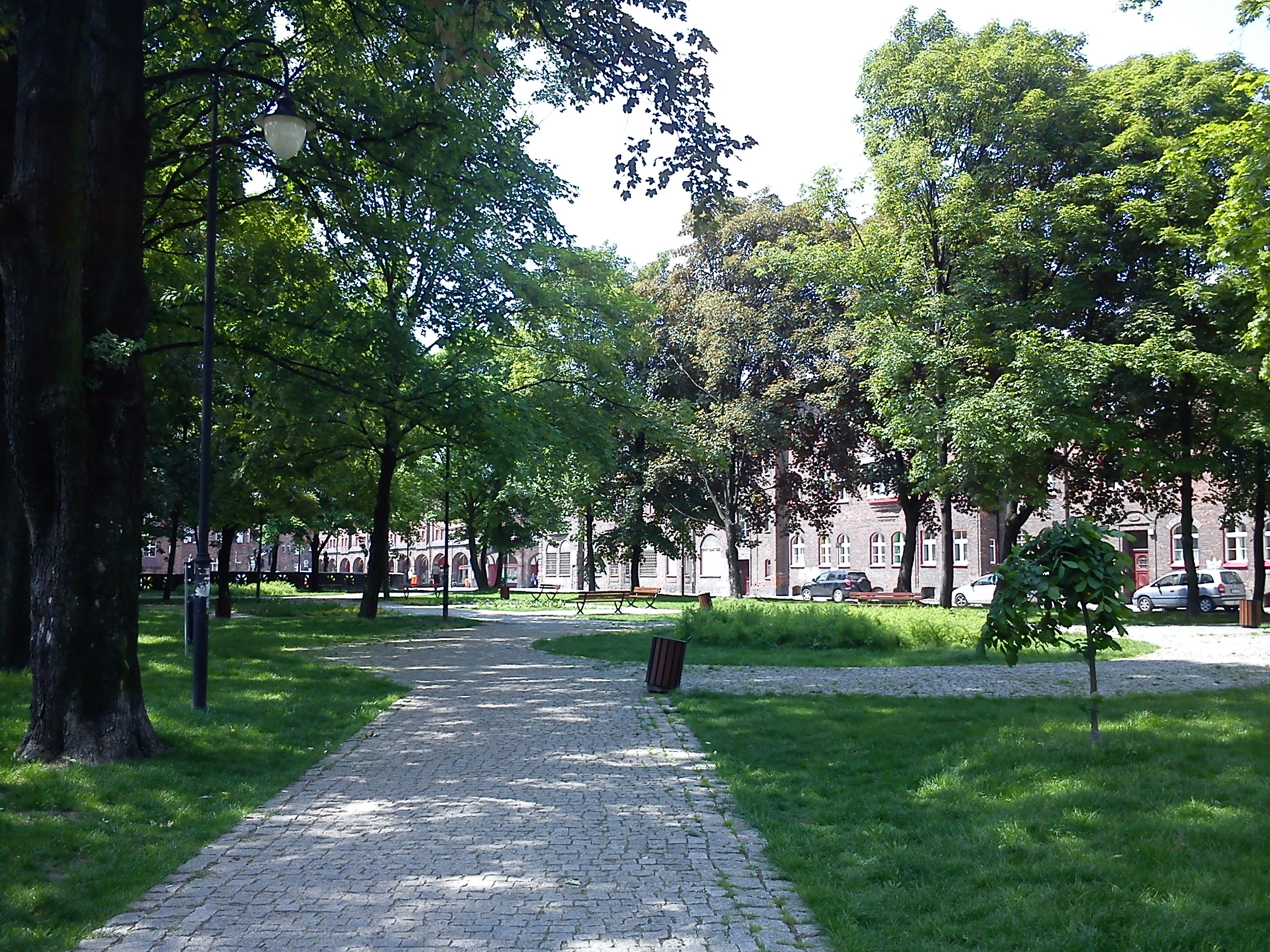
Emil and Georg Zillmann Square

There are no designated nature conservation areas or natural monuments in Janów-Nikiszowiec. The following landscaped green spaces are found there:

- Bolina Park – a park located on Leśnego Potoku Street, along the Bolina river and next to Bolina Pond. It was established in the 1950s as a recreational area for miners from the Wieczorek Coal Mine and their families;
- Emil and Georg Zillmann Square – a square located in the Nikiszowiec housing estate. It commemorates Emil and Georg Zillmann, the architects of this estate.

The allotment gardens in Janów-Nikiszowiec are administered by the Silesian Regional Board of the Polish Allotment Gardeners' Association, Katowice Branch:

Garden name	Location	Area (ha)	No. of plots (2007)
Janowianka, Colony 1	Zamkowa Street	2.05	70
Janowianka, Colony 2	Alojzy Ficek Street	0.49	15
Wieczorka	Górniczego Dorobku Street	10.27	200

== History ==
=== Origins ===
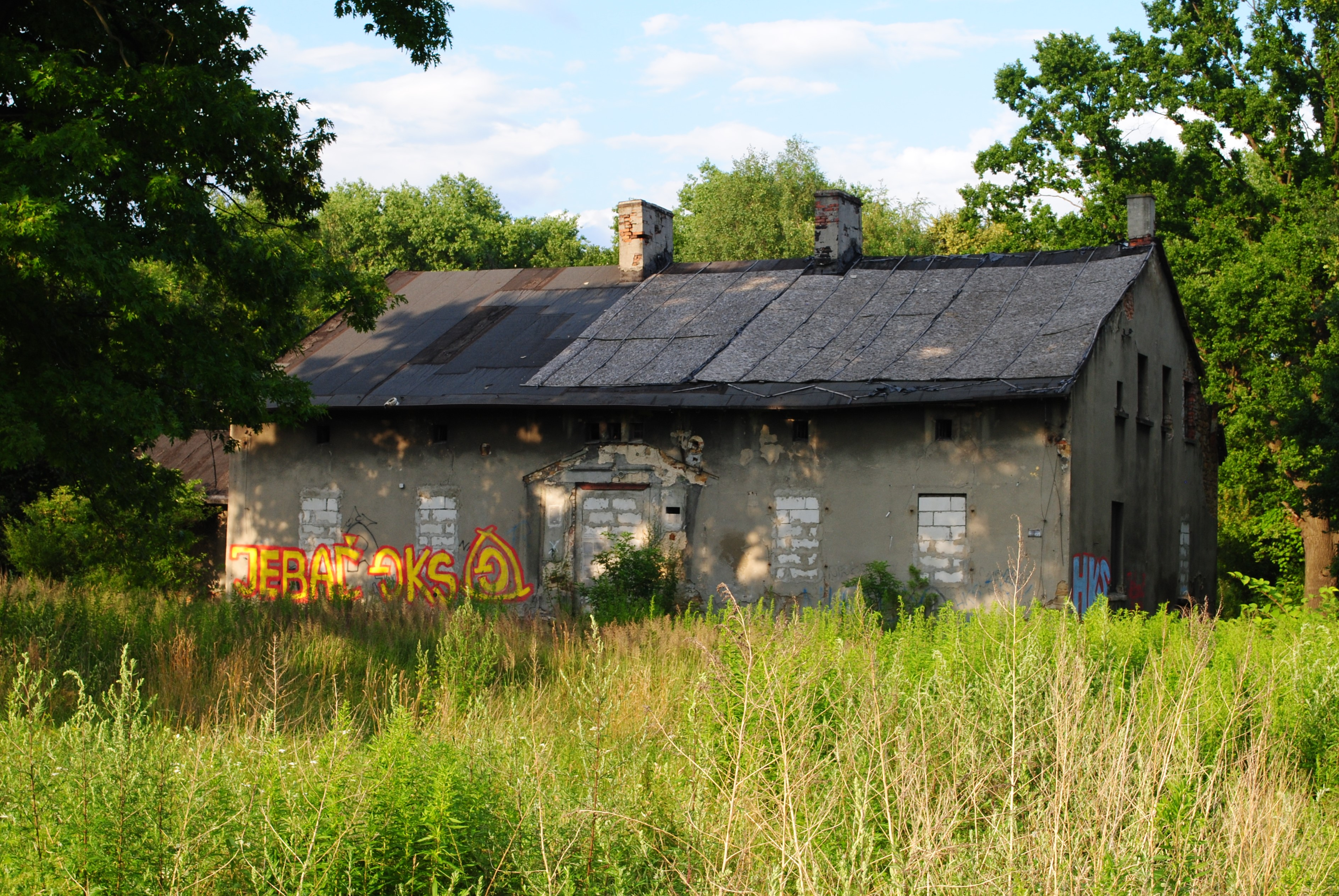
Former Mieroszewski manor at 3a Nad Stawem Street (demolished on 21 October 2021)

Settlement in the area of the current Janów-Nikiszowiec district began to develop in the 18th century, but one hypothesis suggests that the now-defunct village of Jaźwce, mentioned as early as the 14th century, was located within the present-day Janów. The first mention of Janów as a forest settlement dates back to 1742, but the locality had already appeared on earlier maps, including one from 1736 under the name "Jonow".

Until 1617, the lands of Janów belonged to the Salomon family, and later to the Mieroszewski family. In the early 18th century, a decision was made to build a new settlement on the right bank of the Bolina river. The first building was a wooden hunting lodge, constructed on the same site as the later manor house at 3a Nad Stawem Street. During the same period, Jan Krzysztof Mieroszewski opened a folwark, named "Janowiec" after its founder, on a hill on the right bank of the Bolina. The newly established folwark gave rise to the settlement developing nearby, which came to be known as Janów. The folwark itself was first mentioned in a document dated 30 January 1724.

Aleksander Mieroszewski – the last heir of the Mieroszewski family – converted his entire estate into a cash entail on 11 May 1839, along with the right to use the title of entail holder, to the Tiel-Winckler family. During his reign, before and during the November Uprising, Janów was one of the most important locations where underground meetings took place. Aleksander Mieroszewski laid out an English landscape garden between the manor house and the Bolina. In 1848, the first school was established in Janów, located on Oswobodzenia Street In its first year of operation, 84 children attended it.

=== From industrial development to World War I ===
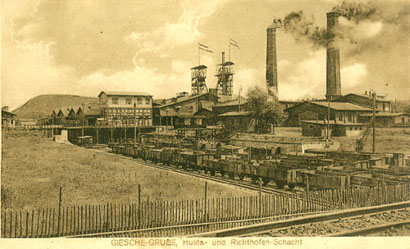
Giesche Coal Mine (now Wieczorek Coal Mine) around 1915

In the first half of the 19th century, intensive industrial development began in the present-day Janów-Nikiszowiec, initiated by the growth of coal mining and zinc smelting. In the 1830s, four mines were opened in Janów: Agnes Amanda (formed in 1840 from the merger of two mines: Agnes and Amande), Gute Amalie, Morgenroth, and Susanne. Their co-owner was Aleksander Mieroszewski, and after the estate was sold, the Tiel-Winckler family. The Amanda Colony was established near the Gute Amalie mine, consisting of single-story and two-story houses. In the 1860s, the Zuzanna Colony was built near the Susanne mine; like the nearby Amandy colony, it consisted of small, overcrowded residential houses. Today, its area is located within Osiedle Paderewskiego-Muchowiec.

In 1841, the Arnold Steelworks began production, and the Huta Arnold colony was built alongside it. In the mid-19th century, the process of enfranchising the peasants of Janów took place, and by 1870, the Right Bank of the Oder Railway (between Szopienice Północne, Janów, and Dziedzice) was opened.

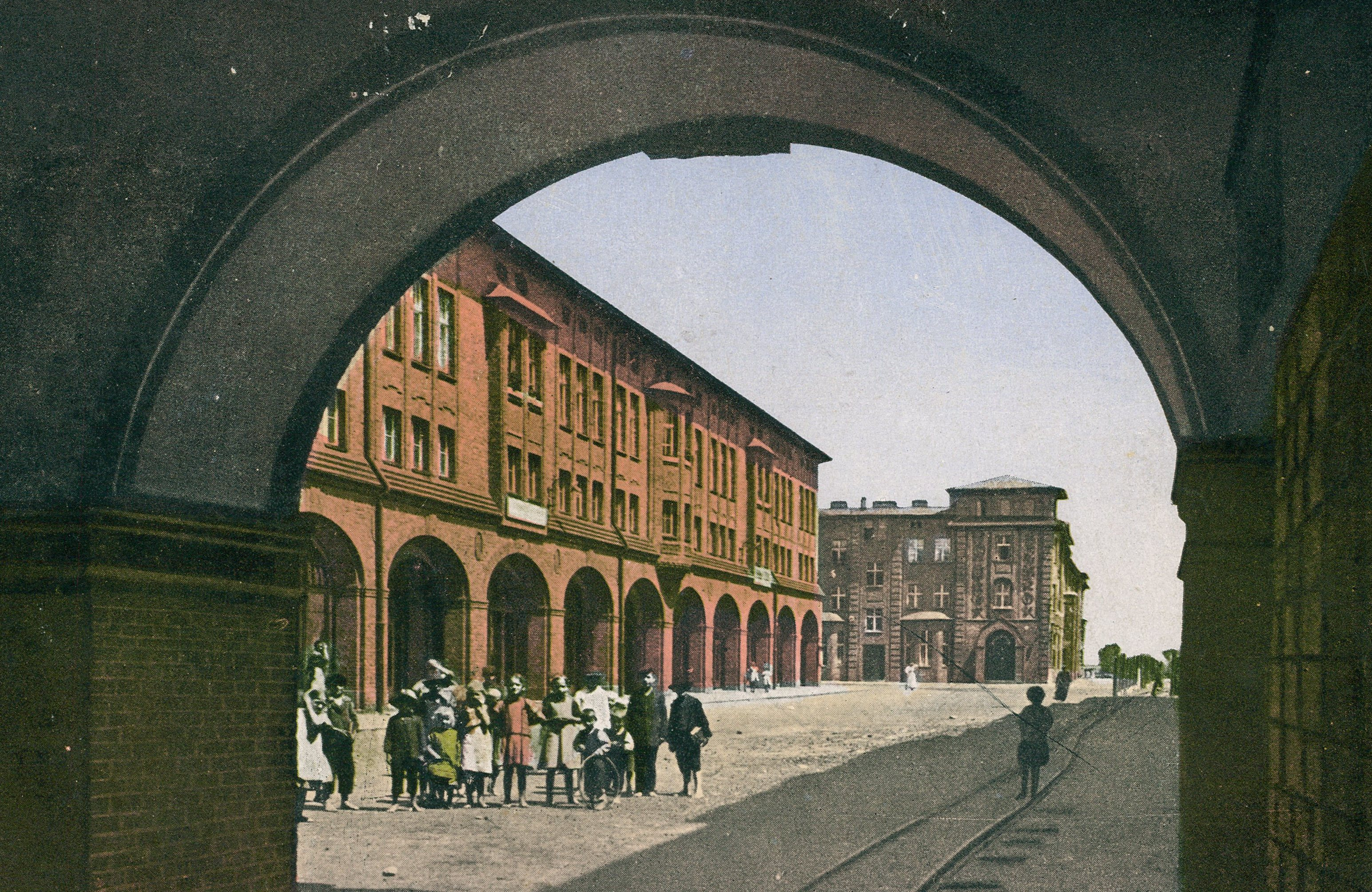
Nikiszowiec housing estate in 1912; view of Liberation Square

The mines were initially established in the forests, while Janów itself retained its agricultural character until the Georg von Giesches Erben company began investing in the area around the village. At first, the Hoffmann shaft (later renamed the Ligoń shaft) was built near the current intersection of Oswobodzenia and Szopienicka streets. In 1883, 10 nearby mines were merged into one – Giesche. On 9 May 1899, seeking to ensure further development, the company purchased the Reserve mining field along with adjacent lands from Count Hubert von Tiele-Winckler for 30 million marks. Almost two-thirds of the Mysłowice forest area (1,900 ha) was purchased. On 13 May 1907, the manor district of Giszowiec was established with its administration in Janów, covering the lands belonging to the Giesche heirs' concern.

In 1907, construction began on the Giszowiec mining settlement for miners employed at the Giesche Coal Mine, but as it later appeared, the number of apartments for mine workers proved insufficient. On 16 December 1908, the County Committee in Katowice granted permission to build a new workers' settlement – Nikiszowiec – in the vicinity of the Nickisch shaft, one of the 14 shafts of the Giesche Coal Mine (renamed the Poniatowski shaft in 1935). An area of 20 hectares was allocated for the construction of the new housing estate, which was ultimately intended to house approximately 5,000 workers and officials.

The housing estate was designed by architects Emil and Georg Zillmann of Charlottenburg. The first apartment building was completed in the fall of 1911. By the outbreak of World War I, six apartment buildings had been constructed, and the last one (IX) was completed in 1919. In 1914, construction began on the Baroque Revival Church of St. Anne at the central square of Nikiszowiec. The church was also designed by the Zillmanns.

=== Silesian Uprisings and plebiscite ===
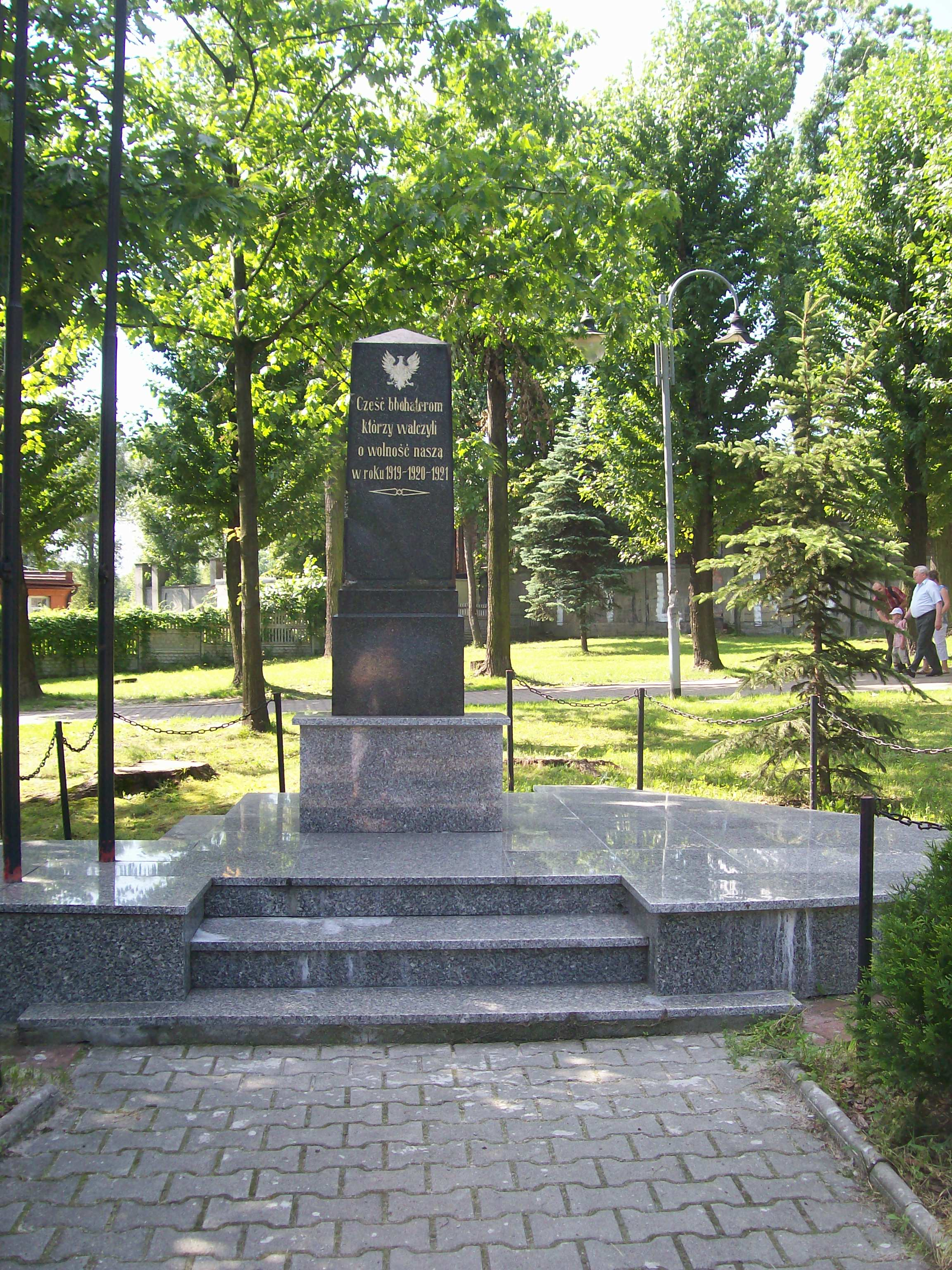
Monument to the Silesian Insurgents at the Artists of the Janów Group Square

After the end of World War I, most residents of Janów and Nikiszowiec expected Upper Silesia to be incorporated into Poland. Some of them decided to take up arms. In 1919, a cell of the Polish Military Organization of Upper Silesia was formed, preparing its members for armed combat. Feliks Marszalski became the commander, and Teodor Chrószcz his deputy. On 13 August 1919, miners from the Giesche Coal Mine joined the general strike, when the First Silesian Uprising broke out.

During the Silesian Uprisings (1919–1921), and especially during the First Uprising, fierce fighting took place in Nikiszowiec over the annexation of Upper Silesia to Poland. On 18 August 1919, fighting took place between the insurgents and the military police in Janów, after which Janów was captured. The insurgents from Janów and Nikiszowiec fought until 24 August 1919, after which they withdrew to Sosnowiec. Kazimierz Kutz's film Salt of the Black Earth recounts the events of that time. During the Second Silesian Uprising, Janów and Nikiszowiec were taken by the insurgents without a fight after the German police were disarmed, and on 19 August 1919, miners from the Giesche Coal Mine began a strike that lasted until the end of the uprising.

On 20 March 1921, in the Upper Silesian plebiscite, 2,045 residents of Janów (80.9% of the vote) and 1,946 residents of Nikiszowiec (74.3% of the vote) voted in favor of joining Poland. Since the results of the plebiscite across the entire region were not favorable to Poland, the Third Silesian Uprising broke out on the night of 2–3 May 1921. Janów and Nikiszowiec were captured by the insurgents without a fight on the first day of the uprising. Insurgents from Janów and Nikiszowiec took part in the Battle of Annaberg.

=== Second Polish Republic ===
Under the German–Polish Convention concluded in Geneva, Gmina Janów and the Giszowiec estate (including Nikiszowiec) were incorporated into the Second Polish Republic in May 1922. With the annexation of Janów and Nikiszowiec to Poland, changes in nomenclature began – "Nickischschacht" officially became "Nikiszowiec", and street names were also changed to Polish ones. In 1924, the Giszowiec manor area was dissolved, and the Nikiszowiec housing estate, together with Giszowiec, was incorporated into Gmina Janów on 1 July 1924. During the interwar period, Polish culture was promoted within the housing estate, and the activities of many social organizations were developed, including the Sokół Polish Gymnastic Society (the local branch was named "Nikisz-Giszowiec"), the Stanisław Moniuszko Men's Choir, the Wolność Mixed Choir (renamed "Halka" in 1927), the People's Libraries Society, and the Polish Scouting and Guiding Association.

Disillusioned by their deteriorating living conditions, the miners rebelled against job cuts and wage reductions. The local revolutionary movement was led by one of the leading communist activists in Upper Silesia, Józef Wieczorek a miner at the Giesche Coal Mine. In March 1937, a strike broke out there, which was the last major protest by Upper Silesian workers before the outbreak of World War II. The strikes taking place at that time were depicted in Kazimierz Kutz's film Pearl in the Crown.

=== World War II ===
On 4 September 1939, following the Nazi invasion of Poland, Nikiszowiec came under German occupation. All traces of Polish identity were removed from public life, and all Polish institutions and organizations were dissolved. On 3 February 1942, the German authorities changed the name of Gmina Janów, which seemed very Polish, to the German name Gieschewald, referring to the former name of the manorial area; Nikiszowiec was renamed Gieschewald-Mitte, Janów was changed to Gieschewald-Nord, and Giszowiec to Gieschewald-Süd.

During the occupation, various underground organizations operated in Gmina Janów with the aim of fighting the occupiers. Among other things, they organized sabotage and disruptive activities. Mass conscription into the Wehrmacht and the prolonged war led to a shortage of workers at the Giesche Coal Mine. As a result, women, young people, and prisoners of war were hired to work there. The prisoners, mainly Russians, were housed in barracks near the Zbyszko shaft (on present-day Transportowców Street).

As a result of the Red Army offensive toward Katowice, around 25 January 1945, the German authorities abandoned Janów and Nikiszowiec, and on 27 January 1945, Janów and Nikiszowiec, along with Katowice, were captured by the Soviets.

=== Post-war years ===
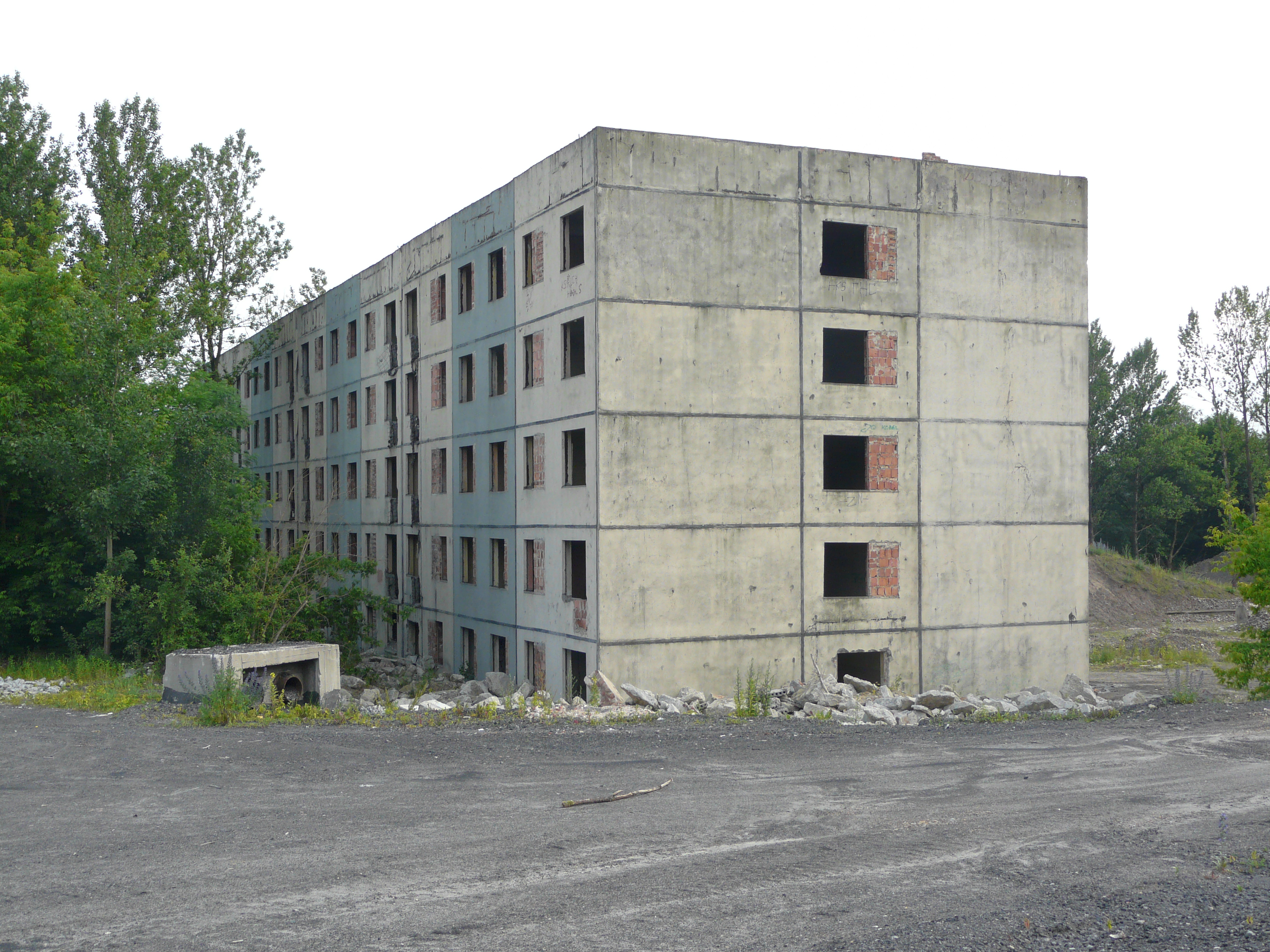
Former Miners' House building

The day after the Soviet army captured Janów and Nikiszowiec, on 28 January 1945, representatives of the committees formed in Janów, Nikiszowiec, and Giszowiec established a Provisional Gmina Council, headed by Józef Żymła of Giszowiec. The Polish names of streets and localities were restored. In 1947, Emanuel Zielosko became the head of Gmina Janów. On 22 March 1951, Janów and Nikiszowiec were incorporated into the city of Szopienice, and on 31 December 1959, they became part of Katowice. In 1978, Nikiszowiec was entered into the register of historic monuments and has been under legal protection ever since.

After World War II, the Giesche Coal Mine was nationalized; it was later renamed "Janów," and in 1946, "Wieczorek." Due to the increased demand for labor, efforts to expand housing facilities began in 1951; a second Miners' House was built between 1956 and 1957, and a third in the first half of the 1970s, located on Górniczego Dorobku Street. In the 1940s and 1950s, a new housing estate of single-family homes, Kolonia Wysockiego, was built between Nikiszowiec and Giszowiec.

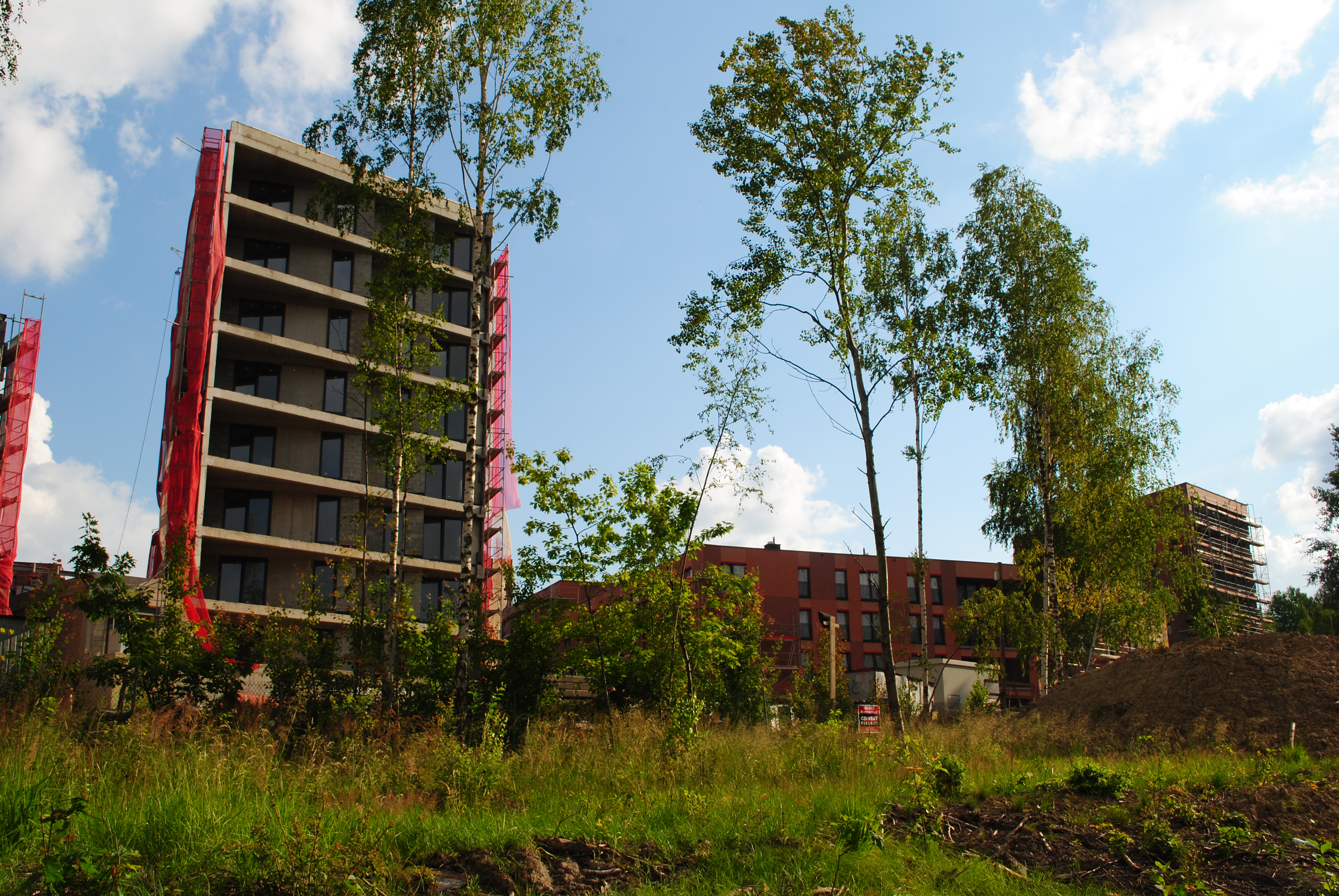
Nowy Nikiszowiec in 2020

In 1989, Poland began a political and economic transformation that also had a significant impact on Janów-Nikiszowiec, and especially on the Wieczorek Coal Mine. A year later, the mine’s restructuring process began, and as part of this, the mine divested itself of its non-mining operations, including sports facilities, a community center, and residential buildings. In 1995, the Jerzy combined heat and power plant was spun off from the mine. Since 2006, the Nikiszowiec housing estate has been one of the attractions of the Silesian Industrial Monuments Route.

In the spring of 2018, as part of the government's Mieszkanie Plus program, construction began on Nowy Nikiszowiec west of the Nikiszowiec housing estate, along the planned connector road linking Gospodarcza Street and Szopienicka Street. In September 2021, the first residents moved into Nowy Nikiszowiec.

== Demography ==
The demographic growth of present-day Janów-Nikiszowiec, especially at the turn of the 19th and 20th centuries, was very rapid. In 1783, Janów had a population of 141 people over the age of 16, including 3 peasants, 2 millers, 22 smallholders, and 3 cottagers. In 1910, before the construction of the Nikiszowiec housing estate, 5,360 people lived in Gmina Janów, of whom 4,475 spoke Polish, and 188 spoke both Polish and German. In 1936, Gmina Janów had a population of 17,820, of whom 517 lived in Janów, 7,185 in Nikiszowiec, and 5,463 in Giszowiec, which is now located outside the district. After 1988, a steady decline in the number of residents was recorded in Janów-Nikiszowiec. At that time, 12,611 people lived in Janów-Nikiszowiec, and in terms of age structure, the proportions were relatively balanced, with a slight predominance of the 15–29 age group. As of December 2007, Janów-Nikiszowiec had 11,496 residents (3.6% of the city's population), of whom approximately 3,800 lived in Nikiszowiec at the time, and 2,100 in Kolonia Wysockiego. At that time, it was the 15th most populous district of Katowice (out of 22 districts). The average population density was 1,330 people per km² and was lower than the average for Katowice as a whole – 1,916 people per km². People aged 15–29 and 45–59 were the most numerous, while those aged 0–14 constituted the smallest share.

Population structure in Janów-Nikiszowiec by gender and age (as of 31 December 2015)
Period/Number of inhabitants	Pre-working age (0–18 years)	Working age (18–60/65 years)	Post-working age (over 60/65 years)	Total
Total	1,636	6,511	1,947	10,094
Women	817	3,079	1,334	5,230
Men	819	3,432	613	4,864
Feminity ratio	100	90	218	108

Sources: 1783 (people over 16 years of age), 1873, 1885, 1900 (according to another source, Janów had 2,429 residents in 1901), 1905, 1910, 1936, 1939, 1988, 1997, 2005, 2010, 2015, 2019.

Population projections developed in 2007 estimated the population of Janów-Nikiszowiec under the pessimistic scenario at 11,256 people in 2010 (99.3% of the 2007 figure), 10,844 people (95.6%), and 9,945 people in 2030 (87.7%). Under the optimistic scenario, the population of Janów-Nikiszowiec was estimated at 11,270 people in 2010 (99.4% of the 2007 figure), 11,011 people in 2020 (97.1%) and 10,304 people in 2030 (90.9%).

== Politics and administration ==
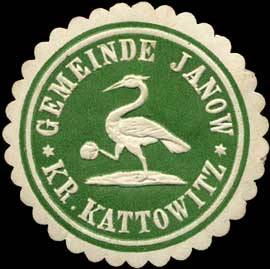
Pre-war seal of former Gmina Janów

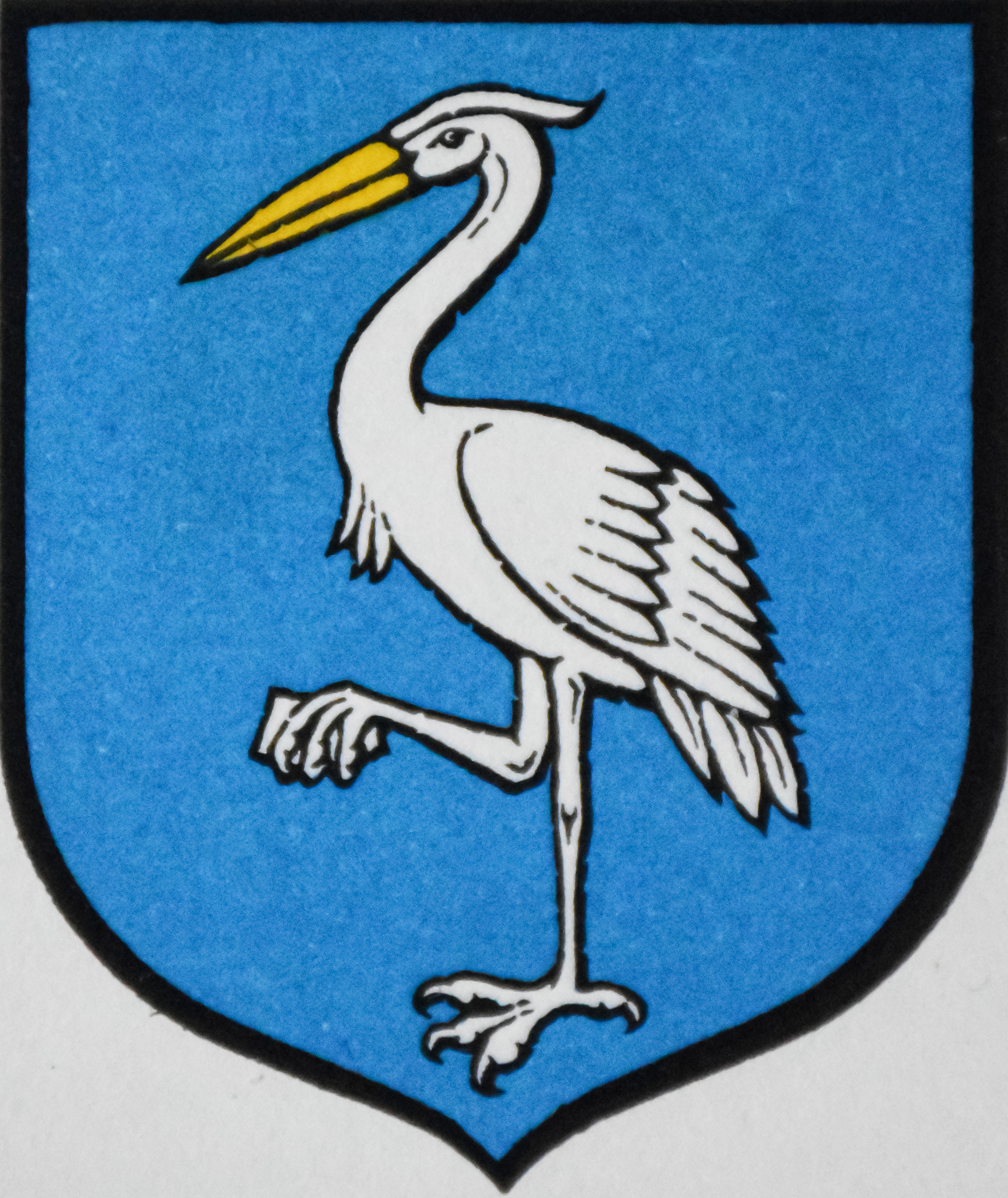
Coat of arms of former Gmina Janów from 1930

Until 1617, the lands of Janów-Nikiszowiec belonged to the Salomon family, who received them following the division of the Mysłowice estates. Through marriages between the Salomons and the Mieroszewski family, the latter eventually became the owners of lands in Mysłowice (including Janów and the surrounding forest areas). On 26 November 1678, the Mysłowice entailment charter was established on these lands. Jan Krzysztof Mieroszewski became the first entail holder, ruling these lands until 1755; in the meantime, as a result of the Silesian Wars, these territories passed from Austrian to Prussian control. Janów became part of the Pszczyna County.

In 1818, present-day Janów-Nikiszowiec was incorporated into the newly established Bytom County, and Aleksander Mieroszewski – the last heir of the Mieroszewski family – sold his estate to the Tiel-Winckler family on 11 May 1839, retaining the title of entail holder.

As industry developed, the Bytom County was divided, and in 1873, present-day Janów-Nikiszowiec became part of the newly established Katowice County. A year later, the separate Gmina Janów was created, along with its own seal bearing the Taczała family coat of arms, depicting a heron standing on one leg and holding a stone in the other. In the act of purchase for the Reserve mining field and the surrounding land on which the Giszowiec and Nikiszowiec settlements were built, the Georg von Giesches Erben company reserved the right to set aside these territories for the establishment of an independent manorial estate. Since 1905, efforts were made to create it, with lands entirely under the company's jurisdiction. The seat of the Giszowiec manorial estate was located in Janów.

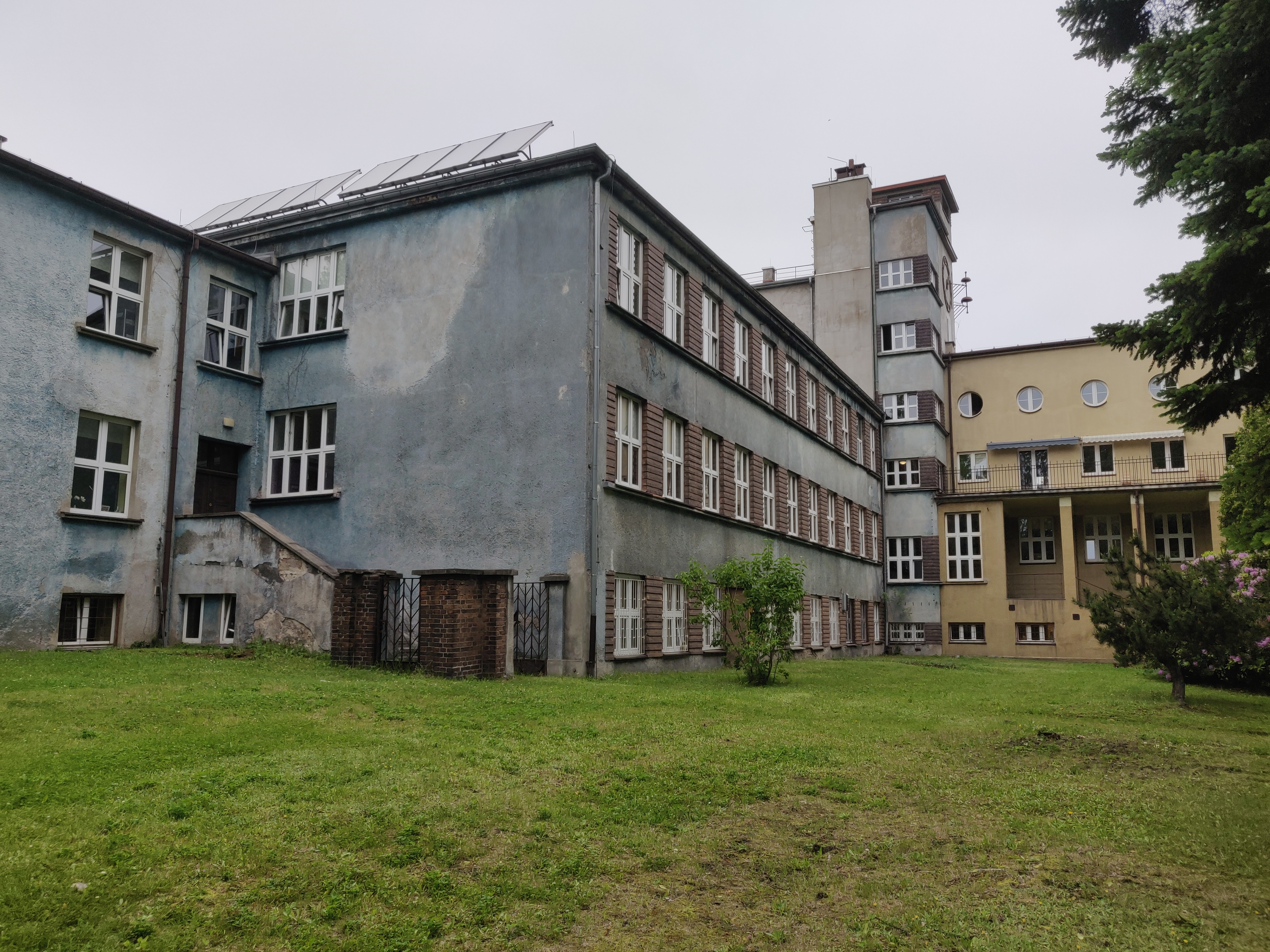
Building of former Gmina Janów office on 59 Szopienicka Street

After World War I, on 15 May 1922, Janów and Nikiszowiec were incorporated into Poland and became part of the autonomous Silesian Voivodeship. The Giszowiec manorial estate, within which the Nikiszowiec housing estate was located, remained a separate gmina with its own administration until 1924. At that time, due to the abolition of independent manorial estates, it was incorporated into the rural Gmina Janów, which then included Janów, Giszowiec, and Nikiszowiec. In terms of land ownership, as much as 95.2% of the gmina's territory belonged to the Giesche company. Between 1929 and 1930, a new building for the Gmina Janów Office was constructed. During World War II, on 8 October 1939, Gmina Janów, along with all of Upper Silesia and the Dąbrowa Basin, was incorporated into the Third Reich, into the Province of Silesia, and into the Katowice Regency, which was established on 26 October 1939. During the occupation, the seat of Gmina Janów was moved to Giszowiec. After World War II, the gmina returned to Poland. In 1947, Janów, along with Nikiszowiec, was incorporated into the Szopienice urban county, and on 31 December 1959, to Katowice, becoming one of its districts.

On 29 September 1997, the Katowice City Council adopted a new division of the city into local government subdivisions, designating Janów-Nikiszowiec as the 16th subdivision within the eastern district group, while also establishing its exact boundaries. In elections to the Katowice City Council, Janów-Nikiszowiec belongs to District No. 2, along with the districts of Dąbrówka Mała, Giszowiec, and Szopienice-Burowiec. Between 2006 and 2010, this district had five representatives on the City Council.

== Economy ==
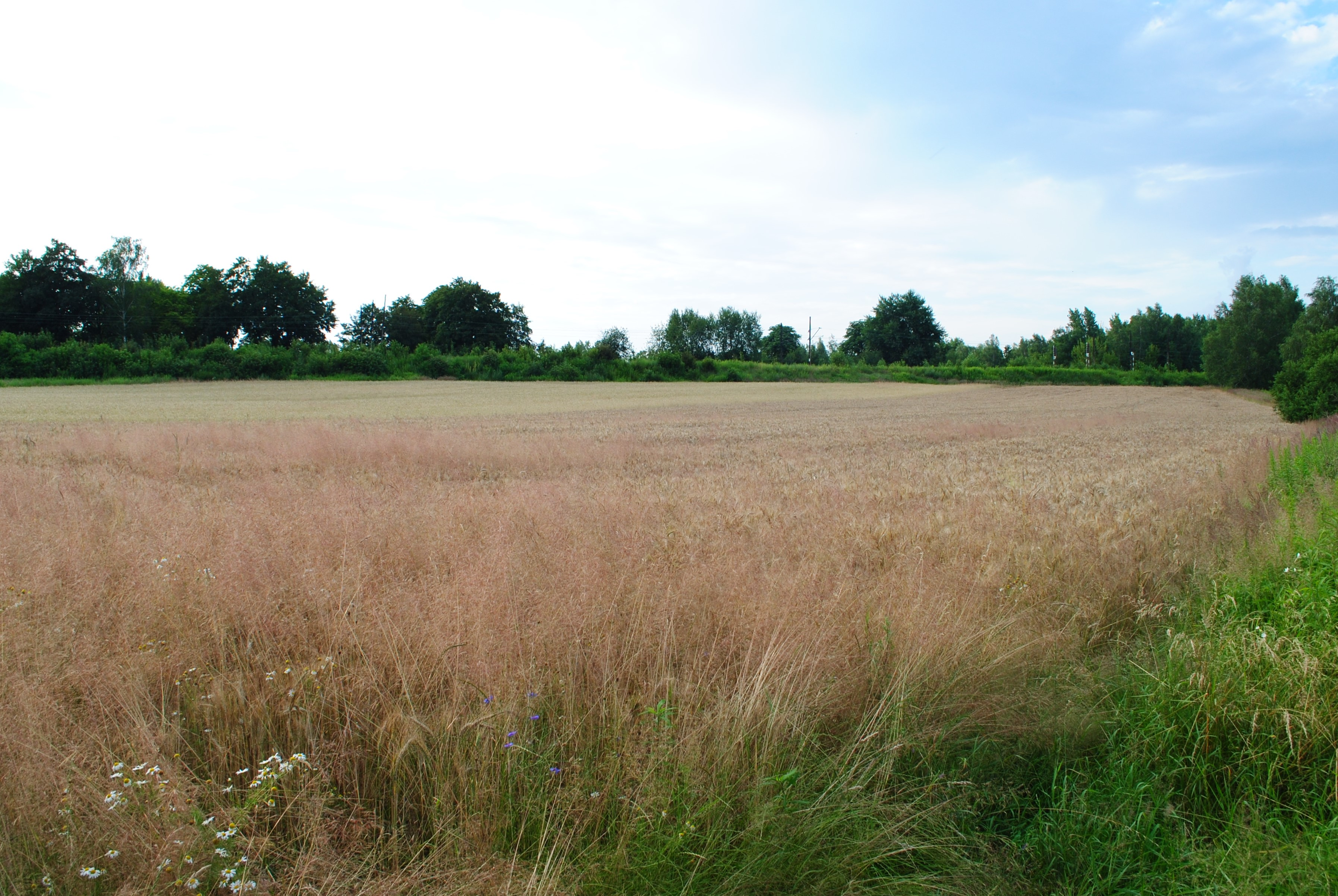
Farmland near Hodowców Street

Until the 1830s, the areas of Janów-Nikiszowiec were mainly forested, and Janów itself was a typical agricultural settlement where, in addition to farming, people engaged in forestry, iron mining and smelting, and where quarries, a potassium screening plant next to the forge, and a glassworks operated. The development of coal mining in Janów-Nikiszowiec dates back to 1788, when a charter was granted to establish the Bergtal Coal Mine, where mining operations took place from 1792 to 1823.

The rapid industrial development of Janów-Nikiszowiec was initiated by the development of coal mining and zinc smelting. Four mines were opened in Janów: Agnes Amanda, Gute Amalie, Morgenroth, and Susanne. In 1841, the Arnold smelter began production. In the second half of the 19th century, two more mines were opened, belonging to the Georg von Giesches Erben concern: Guter Albert and Giesche. In 1883, 10 nearby mines were merged into one – Giesche. After the Giesche heirs' company purchased the Reserve mining fields in 1899, further development of the mine began in 1904 – at that time, drilling began on the Carmer (Pułaski) shaft, and in 1907, the auxiliary Nickisch (Poniatowski) shaft.

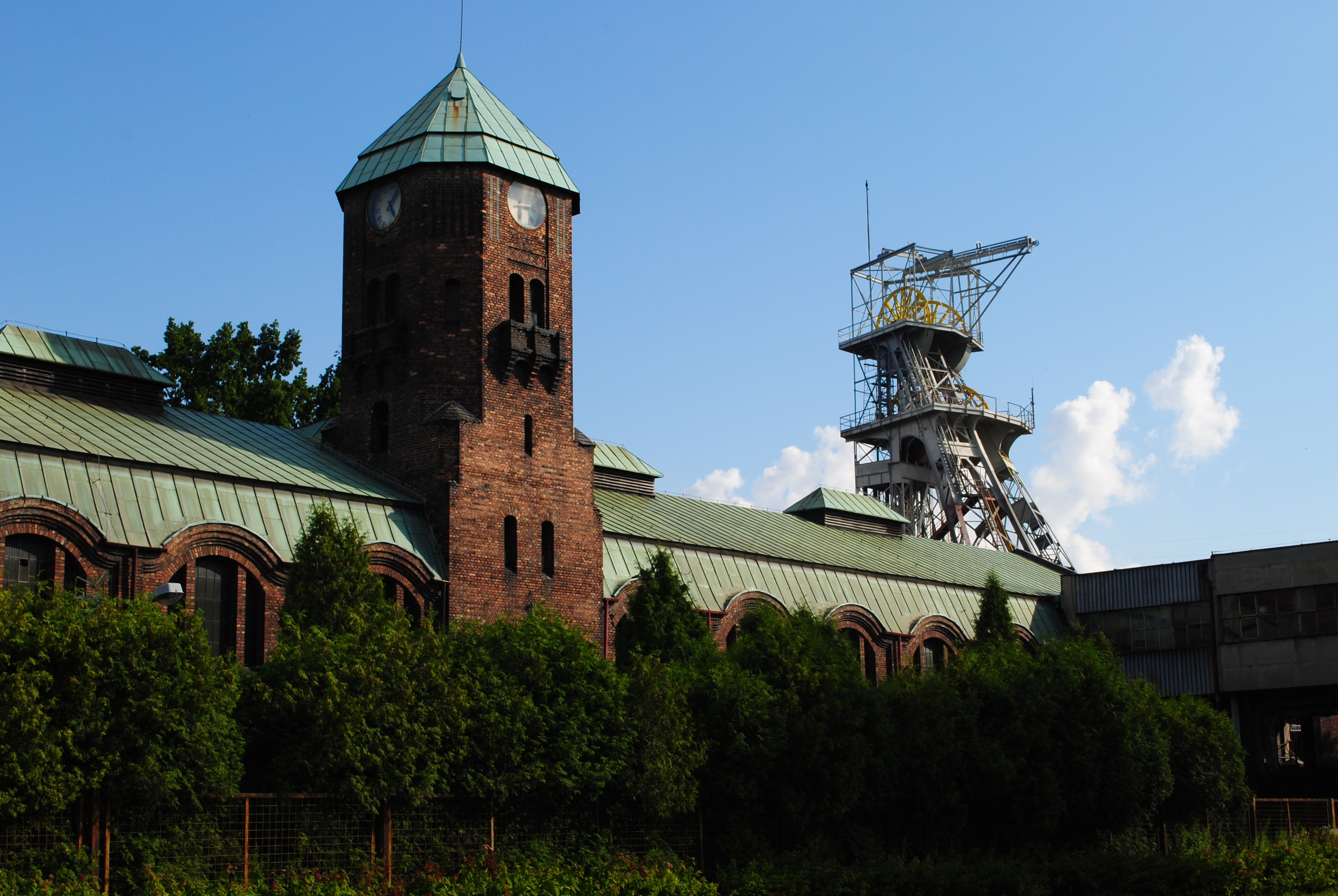
Guild hall and the hoist tower of the Pułaski shaft at the Wieczorek Coal Mine

In the interwar period, following the incorporation of parts of Upper Silesia into Poland, and with it the Giesche mines, a new company, Giesche, was established. In 1926, the Georg von Giesches Erben concern entered into an agreement with American companies, forming the Silesian-American Corporation, which launched a series of investments, including the expansion of the power plant at the Carmer shaft (renamed Pułaski in 1935). During World War II, due to the Third Reich's high demand for coal, production at the Giesche Coal Mine was increased (among other measures, by expanding the workforce and reopening the previously closed Pułaski shaft). After World War II, the mine was nationalized, renamed Janów, and on 1 October 1946, renamed Wieczorek in honor of Józef Wieczorek.

In 1989, Poland's political and economic transformation began, and a year later, the mine’s restructuring process started. Many operations associated with the mine were spun off into separate companies, and as part of this process, the mine divested itself of its non-mining activities. In 1995, the Jerzy combined heat and power plant was spun off from the mine. At the same time, the mine reduced its production – in 1990, 2.32 million tons of coal were mined, and in 2004, 1.75 million tons. Along with this, employment declined – in 1990, it stood at almost 5,900 people, and in 2001, 2,840 people were employed at the mine.

As of 31 December 2013, there were 913 businesses registered in Janów-Nikiszowiec under the REGON system, accounting for 2.0% of all businesses in Katowice, of which 838 were microenterprises (80 enterprises per 1,000 district residents – at the time the lowest in Katowice, where the citywide average was 145 microenterprises per 1,000 residents). In 2013, there were 315 unemployed people in Janów-Nikiszowiec.

Following the restructuring of the mining industry, business activity in Janów-Nikiszowiec is concentrated in the northern part of the district, near Lwowska, Szopienicka, Surowcowa, and Transportowców streets, as well as, to a lesser extent, in the rest of the area. As of mid-August 2020, the following industries operate in Janów-Nikiszowiec: pharmaceutical distribution Farmacol (77 Szopienicka Street); steel scrap recycler CMC Poland (30 Surowcowa Street); furniture industry production plant Komandor (35 Transportowców Street); steel-rubber rope manufacturer SAG (58a Szopienicka Street); tool manufacturer Iscar Poland (14 Gospodarcza Street); meat processing plant Arad (17 Ociepki Street); plastics semi-finished product supplier MPS-Mechanik (1b Oswobodzenia Street); as well as companies associated with the machinery industry (including Hitin, headquartered at 62c Szopienicka Street), and the construction industry (including the Labotest laboratory at 38 Lwowska Street).

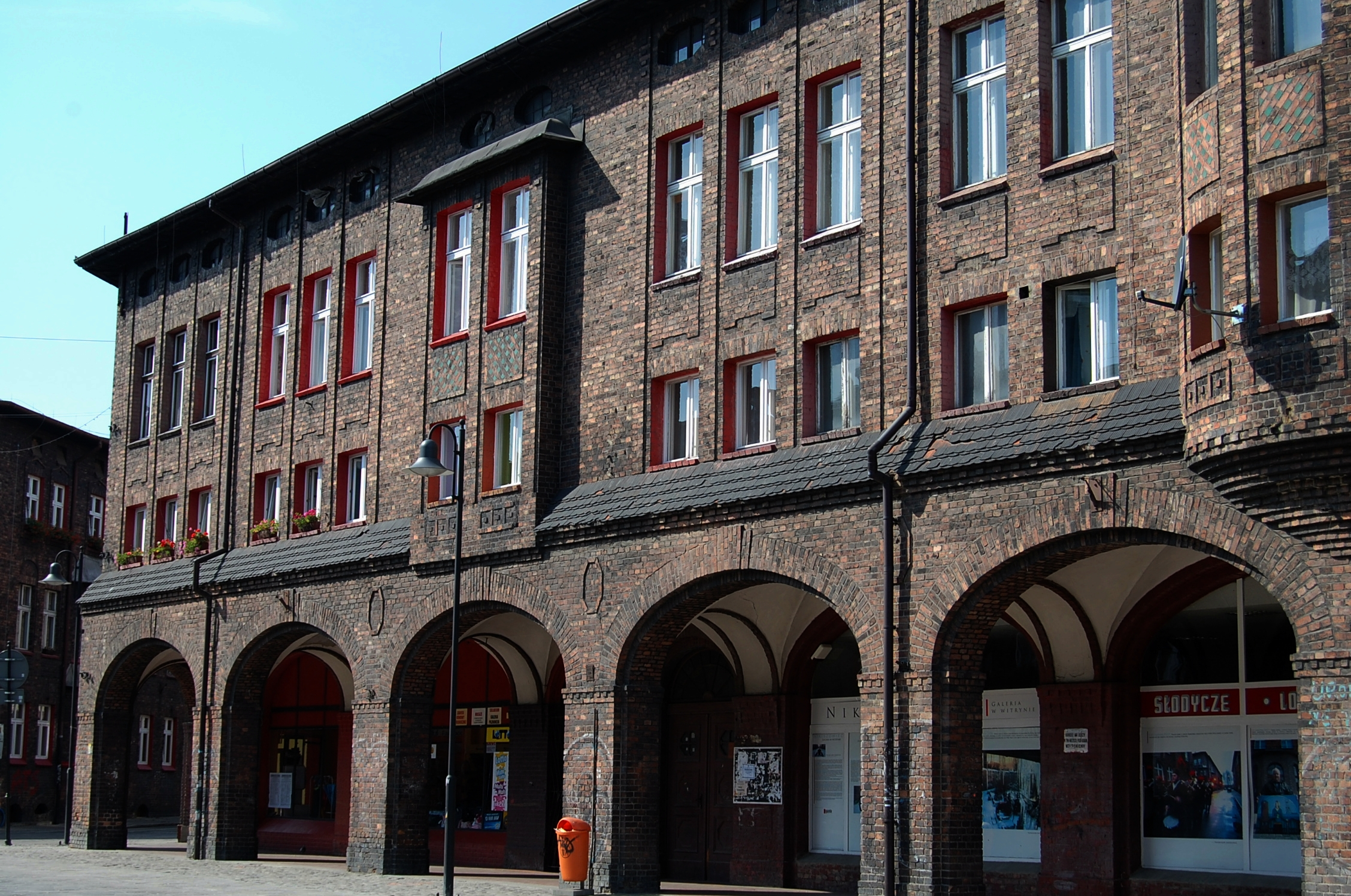
Former Konsum – a building with arcades at Liberation Square, housing shops and other service establishments

Agricultural activity continues in Janów-Nikiszowiec. According to data from January 2008, based on land registry records, the area of arable land was 68.7 ha, while according to actual land use, agricultural areas in Janów-Nikiszowiec total 1.02 ha. They are concentrated in Janów, in the vicinity of Hodowców Street.

Throughout the entire district, there are retail and service establishments from various sectors, including the only Biedronka supermarket in Janów-Nikiszowiec (66 Oswobodzenia Street). Three local retail and service centers have developed in the district:

- The area of the intersection of Lwowska, Oswobodzenia, and T. Ociepka streets – an area where services have developed along the main street, which has rural origins, along with its major side streets;
- The area of Zamkowa and Grodowa streets (the section from Zamkowa Street to Leśnego Potoku Street);
- Liberation Square along with the adjacent streets – it functions as a central square, created as part of a planned urban layout during the construction of Nikiszowiec in the first half of the 20th century.

== Transport ==
=== Road transport ===
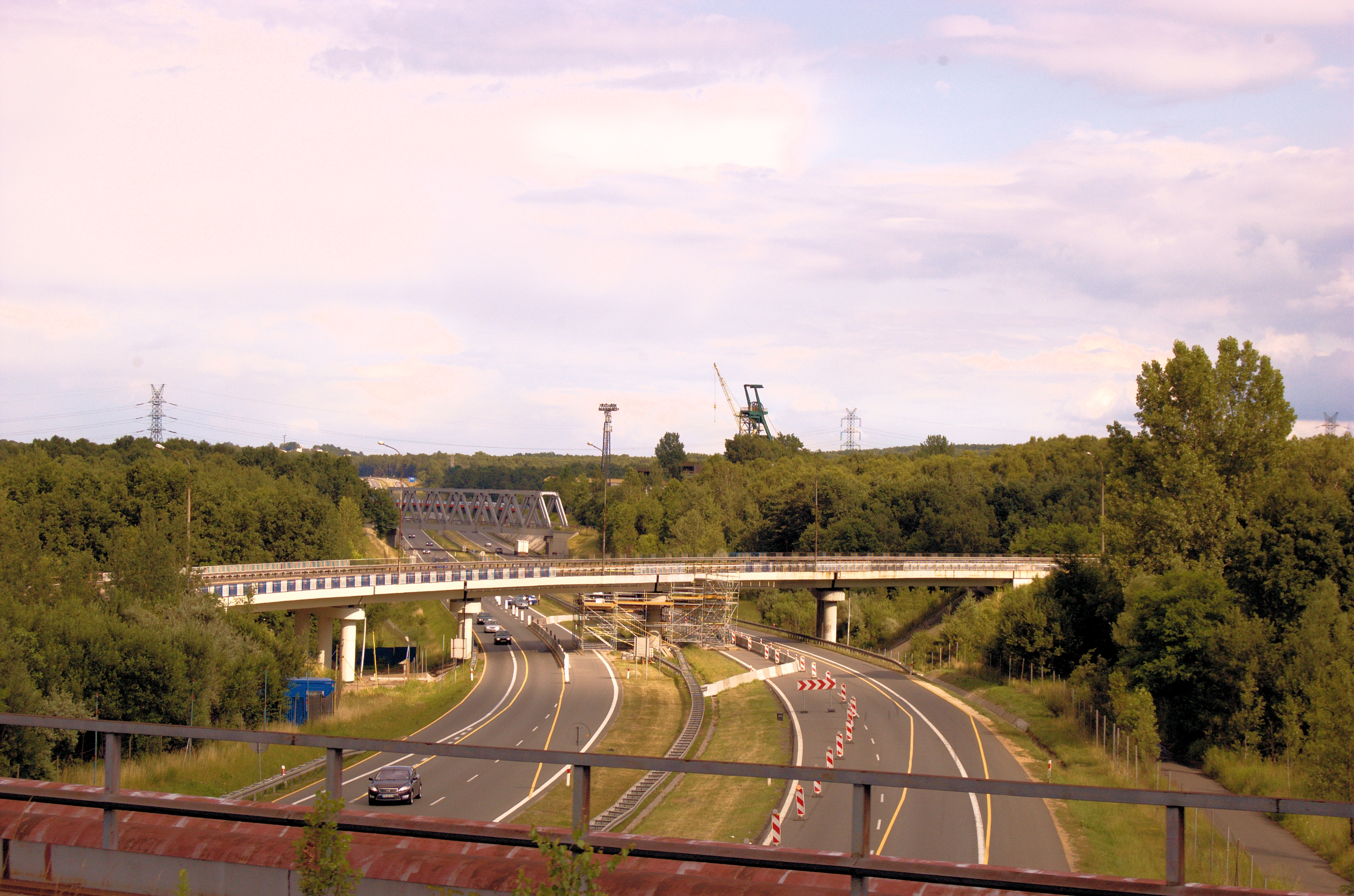
A4 motorway at the border between Giszowiec and Janów-Nikiszowiec; in the foreground, the overpass along Szopienicka Street

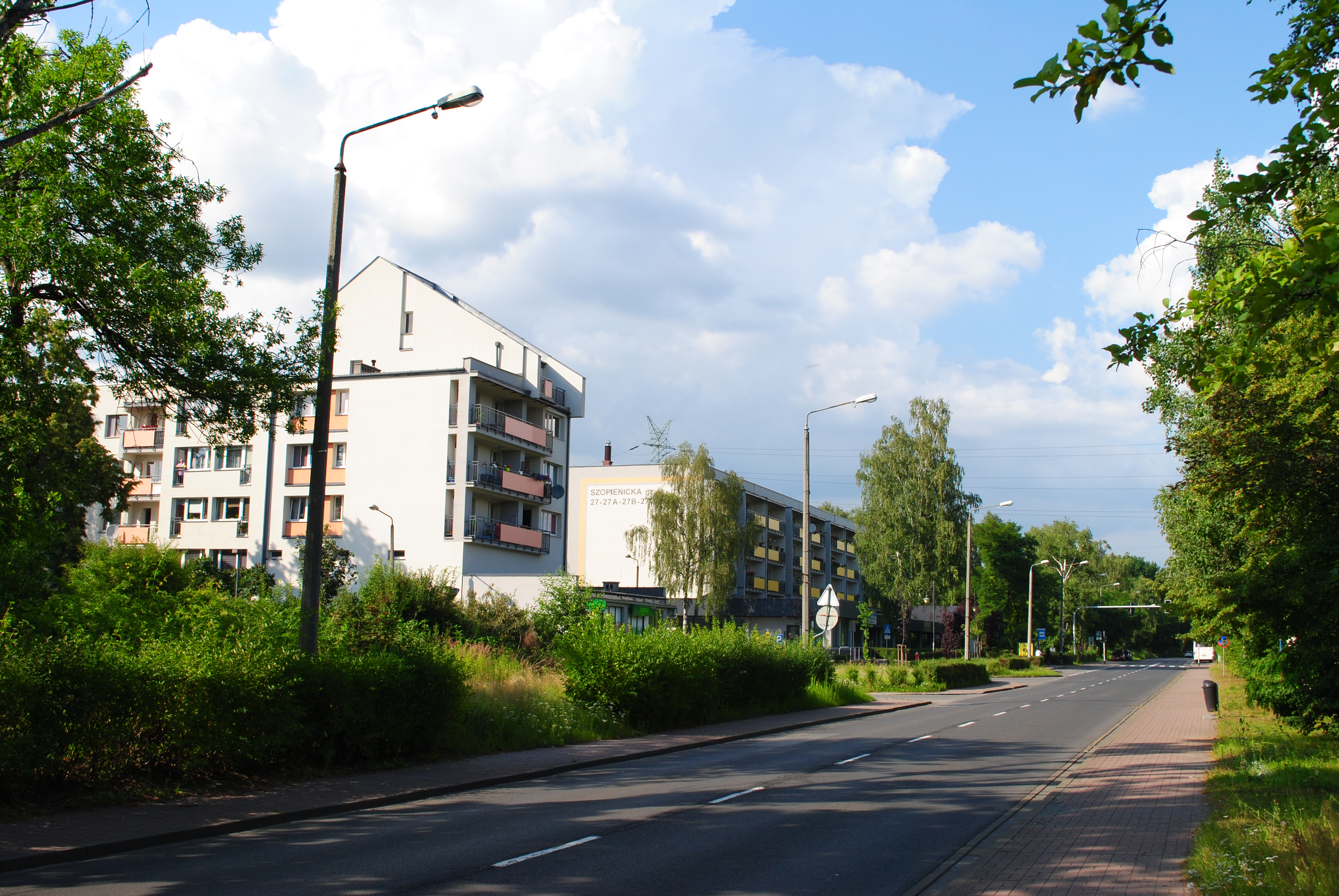
Szopienicka Street near Kolonia Wysockiego

The road network of Janów-Nikiszowiec is diverse, mainly due to Janów's rural origins (Oswobodzenia Street, which is a distributor road), as well as the planned urban design of Nikiszowiec (a regular street grid with a central point – Liberation Square). In Janów-Nikiszowiec, the main road network consists of Lwowska Street, Oswobodzenia Street, and Szopienicka Street. Lwowska Street runs north-south and connects the district with Szopienice-Burowiec. Oswobodzenia Street cuts through the oldest part of Janów and connects the district with Mysłowice in a southeast direction. Szopienicka Street runs north-south through the center of the district and connects to the north with Bagienna Street (national road 79) and with Szopienice. It runs southward and, near the Szyb Wilson Gallery, connects with Oswobodzenia Street. Further southwest, it connects with Nikiszowiec and Kolonia Wysockiego, and, crossing the A4 motorway, connects Janów-Nikiszowiec with Giszowiec.

Other major roads in Janów-Nikiszowiec include Gospodarcza Street (distributor road) and Górniczego Dorobku, Zamkowa, Grodowa, Leśnego Potoku, and Teofil Ociepka streets (local roads).

Several national and international roads run through Janów-Nikiszowiec:

- A4 motorway – runs along the district's southwestern and southern borders. In addition, the Murckowska interchange, connecting the motorway to national road 86 is located nearby. This motorway provides interregional and international connections to the west (Opole, Wrocław, and further to Germany) and to the east (Kraków, Rzeszów, and to Ukraine);
- National road 79 (Bagienna Street and Krakowska Street) – runs along the northern border of Janów-Nikiszowiec in an east-west direction. It connects the district to the west with Chorzów and Bytom, and to the east with Mysłowice, Jaworzno, Chrzanów, and Kraków.

In terms of internal connections with the various macro-regions of Katowice, Janów-Nikiszowiec is well connected to neighboring districts and the center of Katowice, mainly via Bagienna Street; however, it has the poorest connections with Ligota and Brynów. In addition, there is no alternative route from Nikiszowiec to the Bagienna Street–Walenty Roździeński Avenue corridor. The average traffic volume during the afternoon rush hour in September 2007 on Szopienicka Street near Nikiszowiec was 1,068 vehicles, 83.3% of which were passenger cars, while on Oswobodzenia Street during the same period, the average traffic volume was 1,055 vehicles, 92.1% of which were passenger cars.

=== Railway transport ===
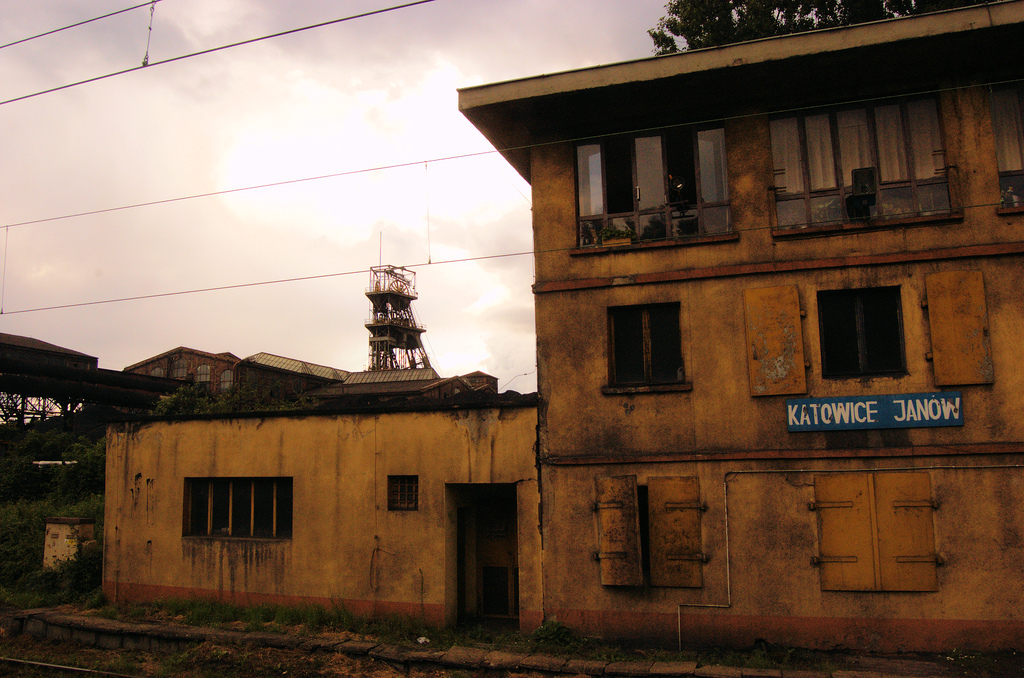
Katowice Janów block post

The first railway in Janów-Nikiszowiec was the Right Bank of the Oder Railway (now Katowice Szopienice Północne–Katowice Muchowiec KMb railway). It was opened on the section running through the district (from Szopienice Północne to Murcki and further to Dziedzice) on 24 June 1870. The railway was nationalized in 1884. It is used only for freight traffic. Parallel to it, an electrified freight line connecting the Dorota block post in Dąbrowa Górnicza with the Panewnik block post via Muchowiec was opened on 27 September 1953 (Dąbrowa Górnicza Towarowa–Panewnik railway) and, in 1960, a railway connecting Mysłowice with Murcki (Mysłowice MwB–Katowice Muchowiec KMa KMb railway). On these railways, near the Pułaski shaft of the Wieczorek Coal Mine, there is the Katowice Janów block post (formerly a freight station).

Narrow-gauge railways also ran near Nikiszowiec, carrying both freight and passengers. In 1906, the Georg von Giesches Erben company received a concession to operate a private narrow-gauge railway, and on 6 January 1914, the Regional Railway Directorate issued a permit to launch passenger service. The newly built railway connected Giszowiec with the Albert (Wojciech) shaft in Szopienice. The first passenger train likely ran in 1916. This railway was commonly known as the Balkan, and travel on it was free. At that time, the Balkan ran 28 times on weekdays and 21 times on weekends. After World War II, the line was electrified. The last train ran on 31 December 1977.

=== Public transport ===
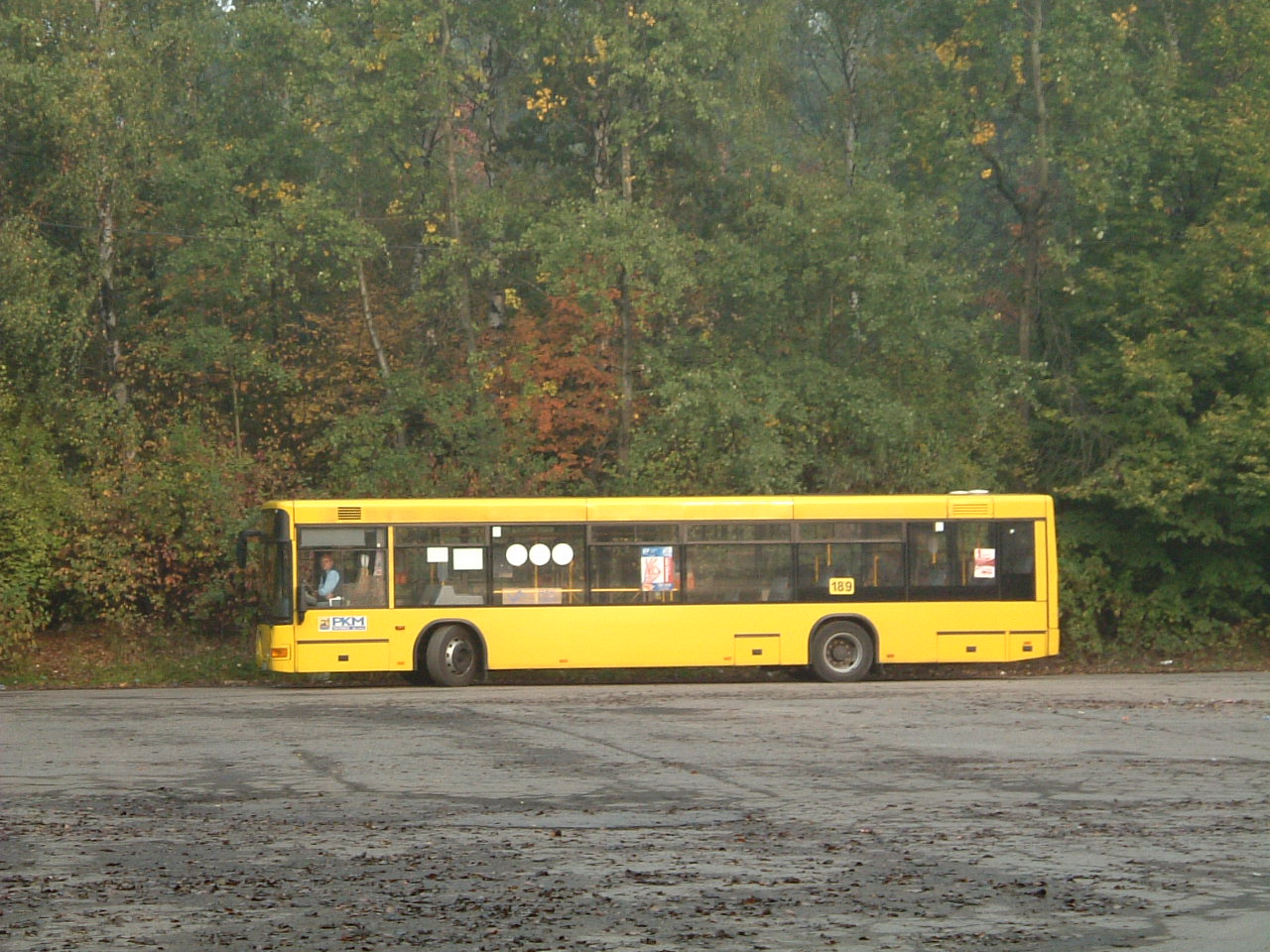
Janów Ośrodek Bolina bus terminal on Leśnego Potoku Street

Public transportation in Janów-Nikiszowiec has been in operation since the 1920s, when Nikiszowiec was connected to Katowice by a bus line. Currently, it is operated by the Metropolitan Transport Authority and provides connections to the other districts of Katowice as well as to the neighboring cities of Mikołów, Mysłowice, and Siemianowice Śląskie.

As of July 2020, buses run on all the main streets in the district (except for the A4 motorway). There are 9 bus stops in Janów, with 11 bus lines, including one night line, serving the Janów Lwowska Szkoła stop. These lines connect Janów with the other districts of Katowice in all directions and with neighboring cities. In Nikiszowiec (including near the former Wilson shaft), there are 6 bus stops, with 7 bus lines stopping at the Nikiszowiec Kościół stop, which also connect this part of the district with neighboring districts and nearby cities. In addition, buses run along Bagienna Street; within the district's boundaries are the southern platforms of three stops, of which 12 bus lines (including 2 night lines) depart from the platform of the Wilhelmina Skrzyżowanie stop, as well as one Jaworzno line. Buses also depart from this stop toward Dąbrowa Górnicza via Sosnowiec, Chełm Śląski via Imielin, and Bieruń via Lędziny. Bus stops are also located at the former Amanda Colony (Gospodarcza Street) and at Kolonia Wysockiego (two stops on Szopienicka Street).

Electronic displays of the Dynamic Passenger Information System are installed at the Janów Lwowska Szkoła and Nikiszowiec Szyb Pułaski stops.

== Technical infrastructure ==
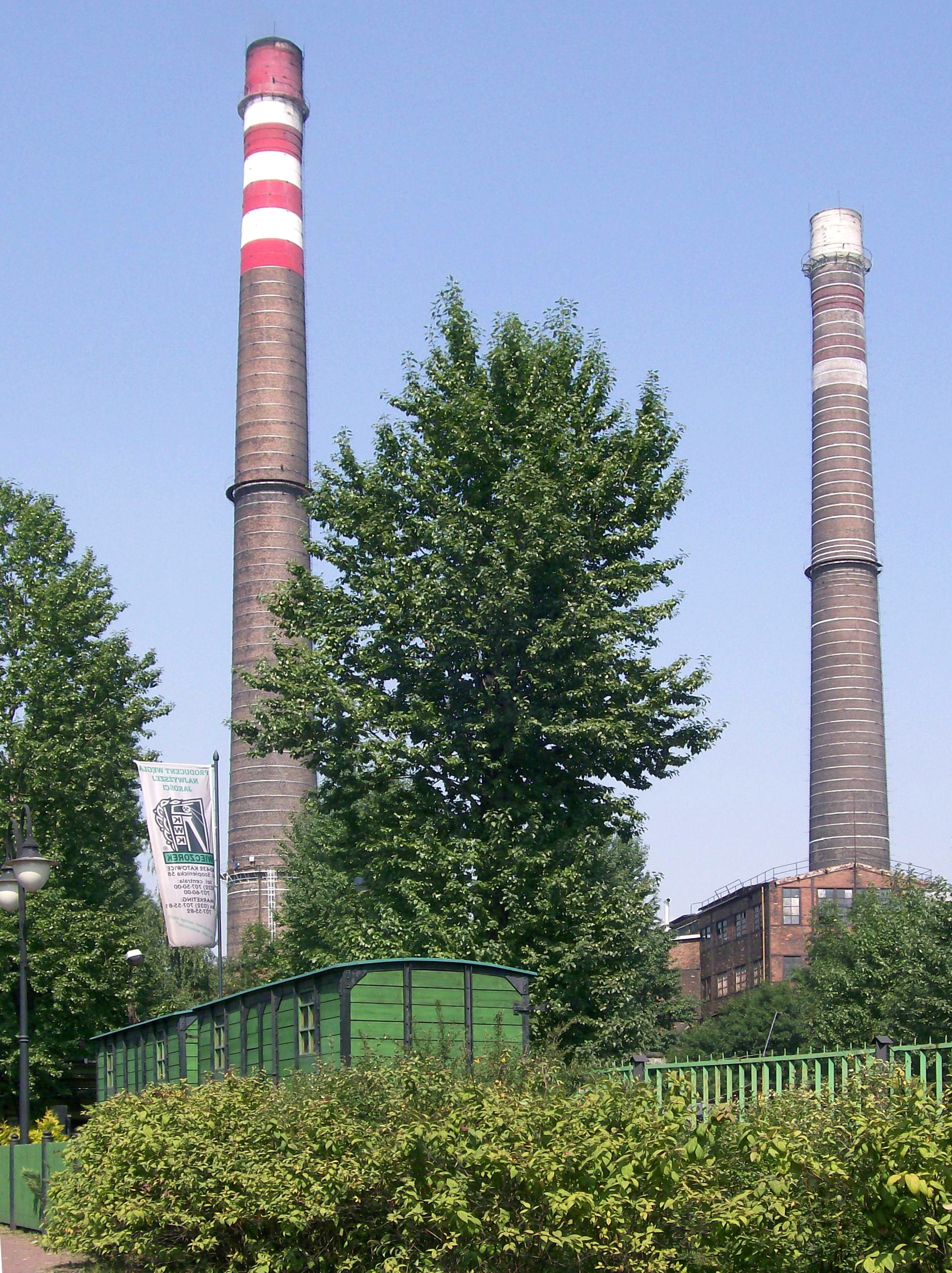
Former Jerzy combined heat and power plant; currently Dalkia Polska Energia – Wieczorek Production Plant

There are no drinking water intakes within the district – Janów-Nikiszowiec, like the rest of Katowice, uses surface water from the following reservoirs: Goczałkowice on the Vistula, Czanieckie Lake on the Soła, and water intakes in Dziećkowice Lake, Maczki, and Kozłowa Góra. Water from the Water Treatment Plant is distributed via main and distribution water mains. Main water mains managed by Katowice Waterworks (including the 500/400 Giszowiec-Janów main) run through the district, as well as a water main managed by the Upper Silesian Waterworks Company (the 1400 Murcki – Zagórze main).

The sewer system is managed by Katowice Waterworks and is currently part of the catchment area of the Radocha wastewater treatment plant in Sosnowiec; ultimately, it is intended to become part of the catchment area of the Dąbrówka Mała-Centrum wastewater treatment plant.

Electricity is supplied to the residents of Janów-Nikiszowiec via a 110-kV high-voltage grid connecting the town to nearby power plants. The only substation in the district is located on Szopienicka Street, near the former Jerzy combined heat and power plant. It is the Janów substation with a 110/6 kV voltage level, with two 16 MVA transformers. A 220 kV extra-high-voltage transmission line also runs between Kolonia Wysockiego and Nikiszowiec and further north along Nowy Nikiszowiec, originating from the Łagisza power plant. The power grid is managed by the Tauron Group. The average electricity consumption per household in Katowice was 865.7 kWh in 2006.

Heat is supplied by the Dalkia Polska Energia – Wieczorek Production Plant, located near Nikiszowiec at 58 Szopienicka Street. Its thermal capacity in September 2009 was 131.1 MW.

== Architecture and urban planning ==
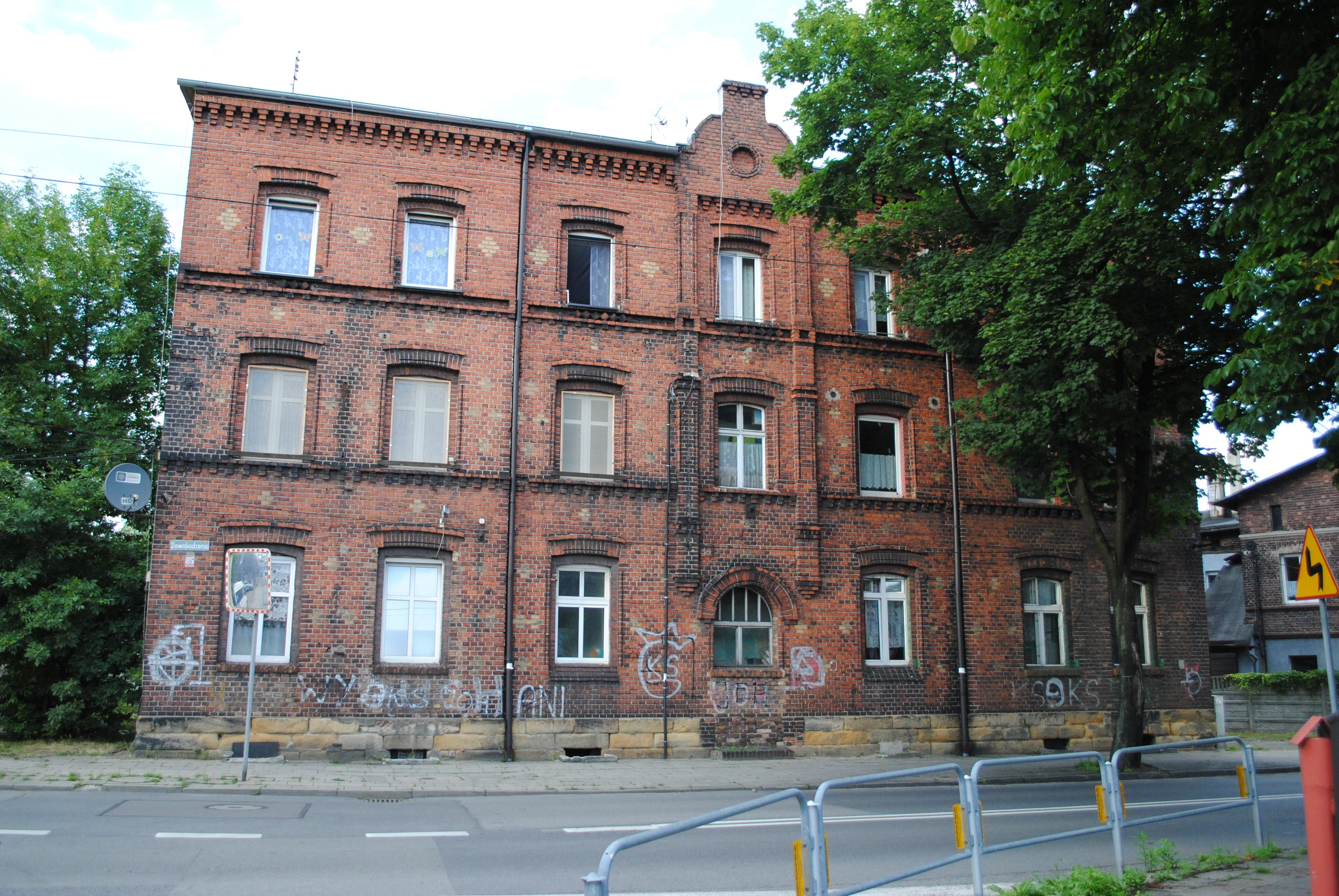
Familok at 85 Oswobodzenia Street

The architecture of Janów-Nikiszowiec is diverse. It is concentrated mainly along Oswobodzenia (a street with rural roots in Janów, originally a built-up linear settlement), Zamkowa, Grodowa, Leśnego Potoku, Nad Stawem (a mix of high- and low-rise residential buildings), and Szopienicka streets, where the Nikiszowiec housing estate and Kolonia Wysockiego are located. These buildings have diverse origins. The oldest structures in Janów-Nikiszowiec are concentrated along Oswobodzenia Street, where some of the buildings were constructed before 1900 (including 40, 60, 67, 89, 96, and 116 Oswobodzenia Street, as well as individual buildings on Grodowa, Leśnego Potoku, and Nad Stawem streets). Janów underwent significant expansion by 1922. The historic Nikiszowiec housing estate was also built during this time. In the interwar years, individual buildings were constructed, including the Church of St. Anne, whose construction had begun before World War I, and the new building of the Gmina Janów Office.

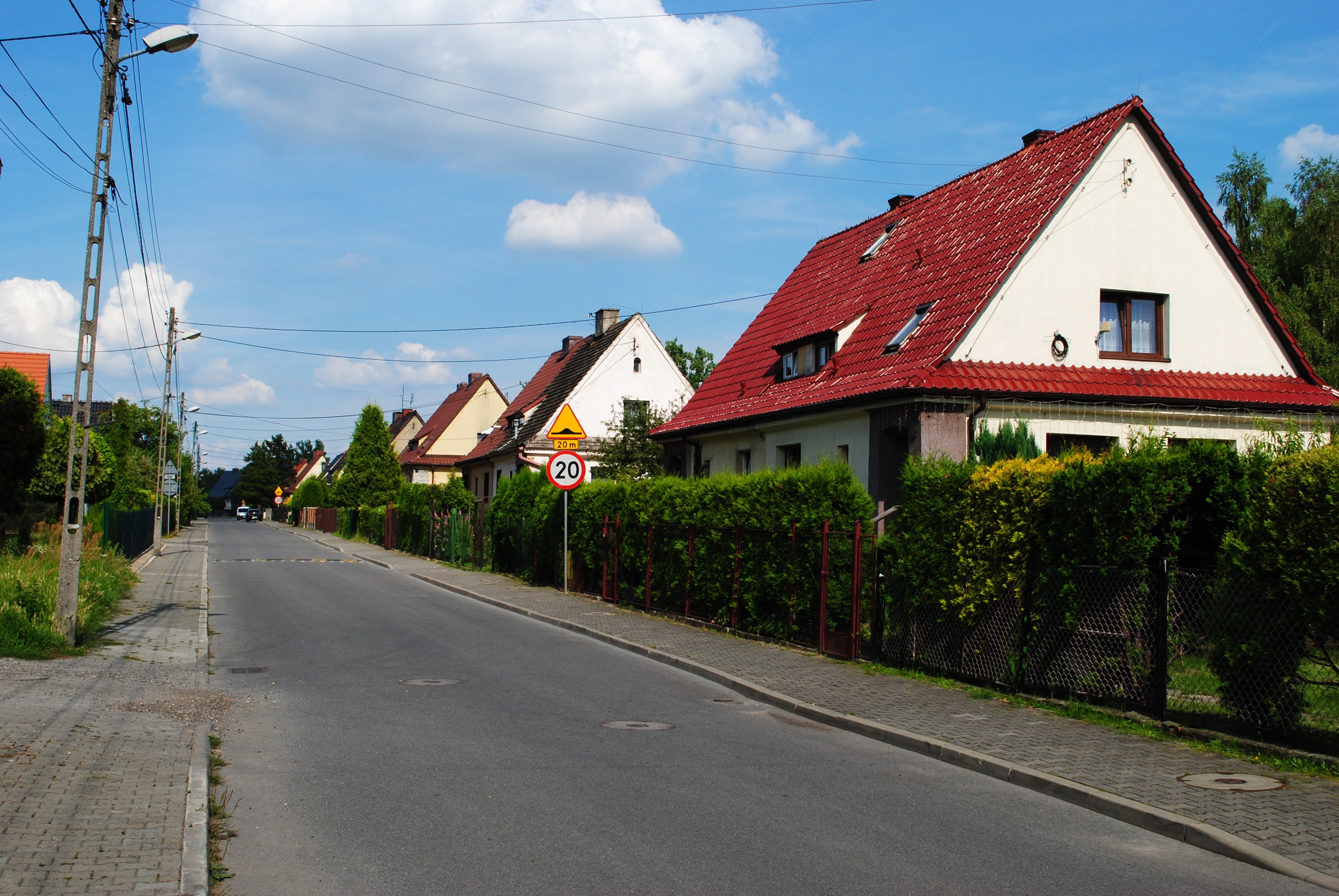
Kolonia Wysockiego (T. Kulik Street)

Janów-Nikiszowiec underwent significant urban development from 1945 to 1972. During this period, in the 1940s and 1950s, a housing estate was built near Zamkowa Street, which was later expanded between 1968 and 1970. In addition, Kolonia Wysockiego was built between 1950 and 1952, while apartment blocks at 36 and 38 Oswobodzenia Street and a neighborhood of single-family homes on Bzów Street were completed between 1960 and 1961. Apartment blocks at 31–35 Leśnego Potoku Street were completed in 1963. During this period, the Jantor sports hall and individual single-family homes in various parts of Janów were also built. Between 1972 and 1989, construction of new buildings in Janów and Kolonia Wysockiego was further intensified. In the 1970s, new apartment blocks were built on Zamkowa, Grodowa, and Leśnego Potoku streets, along with a shopping center, and by the end of the 1980s, new single-family homes were being built, mainly along Boliny, Ruczajowa, and Strumienna streets. During the same period, new apartment blocks were built in Kolonia Wysockiego: between 1974 and 1977 on Braci Woźniaków Street, and between 1981 and 1983 at 13–27 Szopienicka Street. After 1989, relatively few structures were built. At that time, individual residential buildings and utility buildings were constructed (including developments on Gospodarcza and Ociepka streets); in 2010, a new hospital building at 65 Szopienicka Street; and in 2013, a Biedronka store on Oswobodzenia Street.

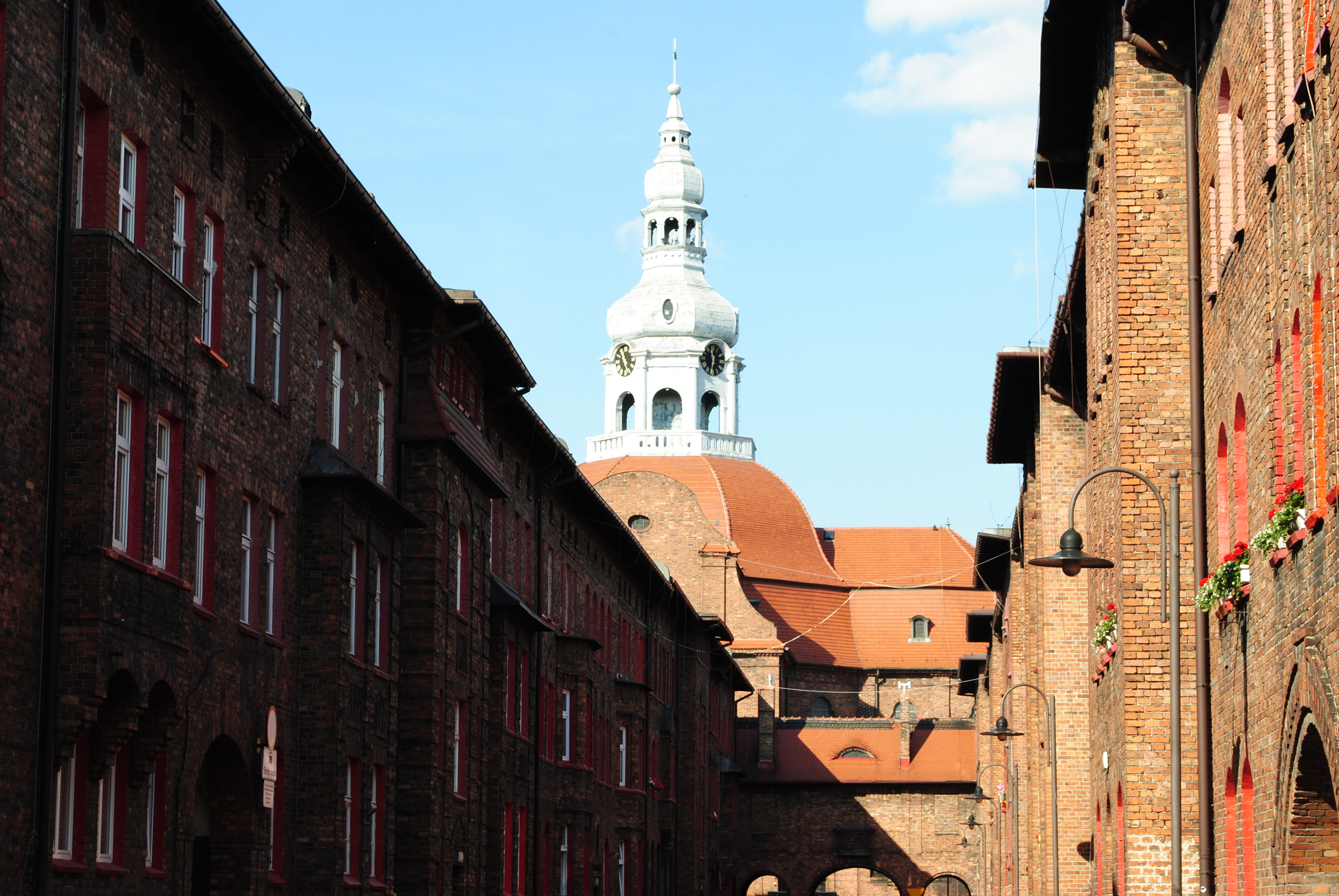
St. Anne Street in Nikiszowiec; in the background the Church of St. Anne

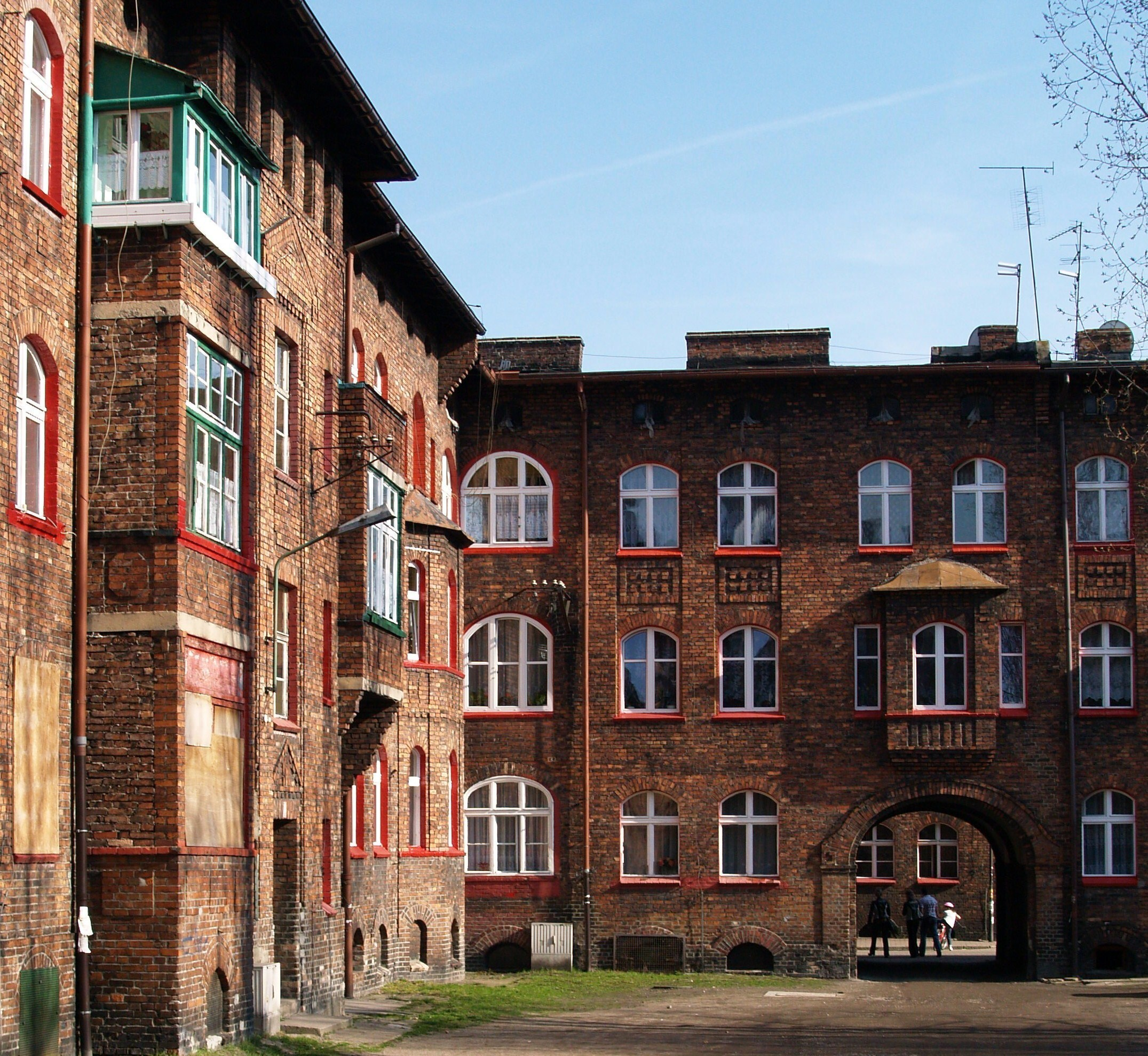
Fragment of a courtyard in Nikiszowiec

The Nikiszowiec workers' housing estate is located in Janów-Nikiszowiec. The entire complex consists of nine interconnected brick buildings and the Baroque Revival Church of St. Anne. The Nikiszowiec complex was built according to a design by Emil and Georg Zillmann. The first apartment block was completed in 1911, and the last – IX – was finished in 1919. The housing estate acquired its current appearance in 1927, when construction of the church was completed. Approximately 1,000 apartments were built in the housing estate, along with a park, an administrative building, a guild hall, a bathhouse with a boiler room for the entire crew of the Giesche Coal Mine, a dormitory with 504 beds, a church, an inn, a police station, shops, a laundry, and a school with apartments for teachers. The residential building consisted of 165 apartments. A typical apartment in Nikiszowiec consisted of two rooms with a kitchen and had an area of approximately 63 m².

The buildings, clad in raw red brick, form the architectural unity of the housing estate. The buildings are distinguished by many details: bay windows of varying heights, depths, and shapes, as well as entrance portals. The urban layout of Nikiszowiec was designed in a regular grid pattern of streets intersecting at right angles. Viewed from above, the estate resembles an amphitheater with a stage at its center, which is Liberation Square.

=== Historic sites ===
According to the Register of Cultural Property of the National Institute of Cultural Heritage, the following structures in Janów-Nikiszowiec are listed as historic sites:

- The urban and spatial layout of the Nikiszowiec workers' housing estate from between 1908 and 1918, registry no. A/1230/78 of 19 August 1979. By a regulation of the President of the Republic of Poland dated 14 January 2011, the estate was designated a historic monument;
- The Pułaski shaft complex of the Wieczorek Coal Mine on Szopienicka Street from between 1903 and 1911, registry no. A/1384/89 of 20 March 1989, including the headframe with a hoist tower, sorting plant, engine room, forge, mechanical workshop, carpentry shop, changing room, and bathhouse.

=== Spatial planning ===
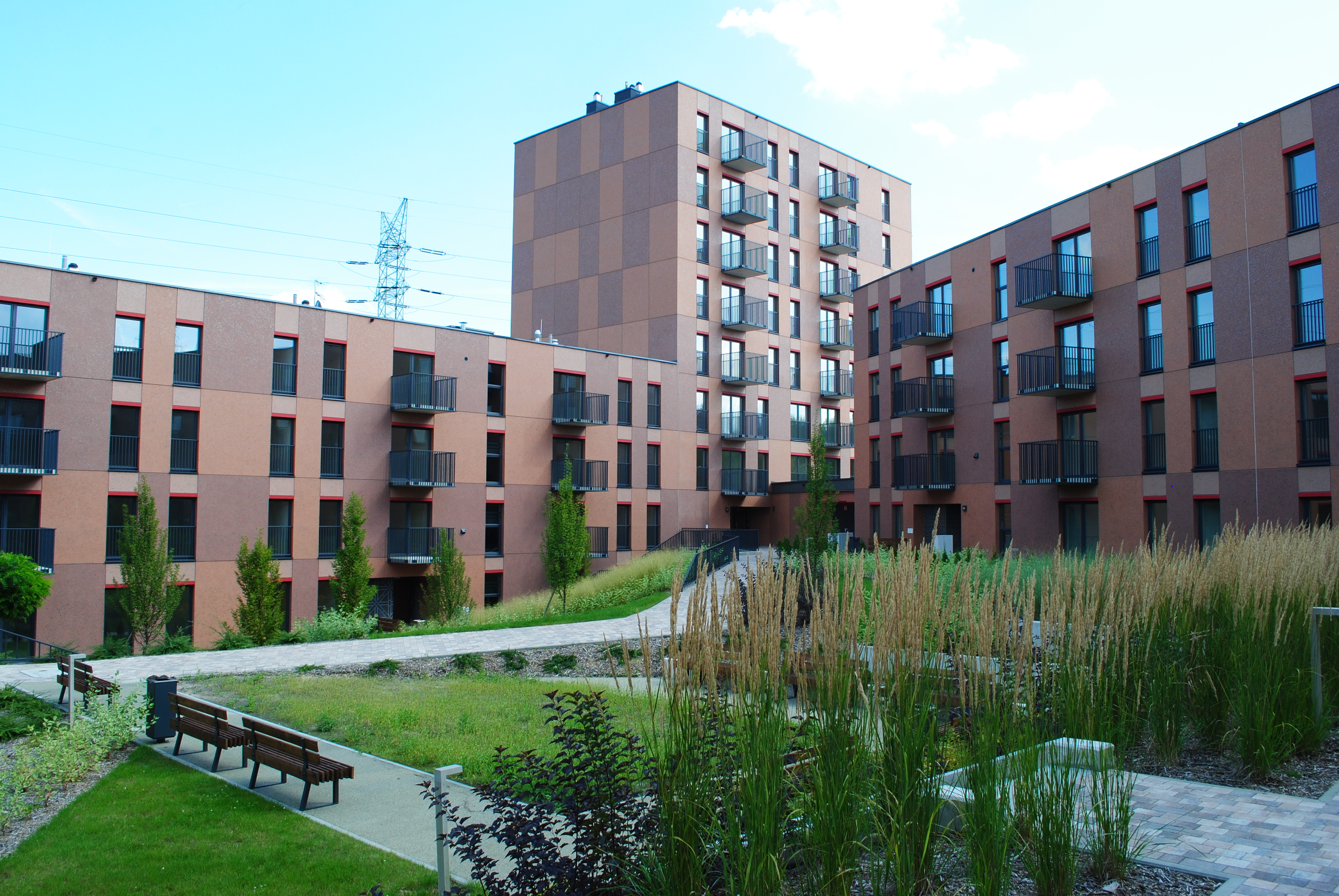
Part of the Nowy Nikiszowiec housing estate

Within the spatial structure of Katowice, Janów-Nikiszowiec is a settlement unit located in the southeastern sector, developed within the former Gmina Janów, specifically the Nikiszowiec housing estate, one of the company-sponsored estates associated with the Wieczorek Coal Mine (together with Nikiszowiec). In terms of the proportion of built-up area to total land area, Janów-Nikiszowiec does not deviate from the average for Katowice as a whole (23%). The weighted average number of stories in buildings in the district was 1.78 in 2007, which was lower than the average for Katowice as a whole (2.13).

In terms of actual land use, Janów-Nikiszowiec is characterized by a high proportion of forested areas. According to data from January 2008, the total share of forests in the land use structure of the Janów-Nikiszowiec urban unit was 36.86% (287.45 ha out of 779.86 ha of the urban unit's area) and is close to the value for the entire city of Katowice, which is 41.38%. In addition, a large share is occupied by undeveloped green areas (13.06%; 101.86 ha), transportation areas (11.92%; 92.93 ha), and vacant building sites (10.87%; 84.74 ha). Compared to other urban planning units, Janów-Nikiszowiec is characterized by a significant share of undeveloped green areas, which is twice as high as for Katowice as a whole (higher only in the units of Osiedle Tysiąclecia, Zarzecze, and Dąbrówka Mała). Furthermore, the proportion of industrial and commercial areas and vacant building sites is significantly higher there than in Katowice. In Janów-Nikiszowiec, the area of single-family residential development was 24.88 ha in 2008, and that of multi-family residential development was 35.27 ha.

== Education ==
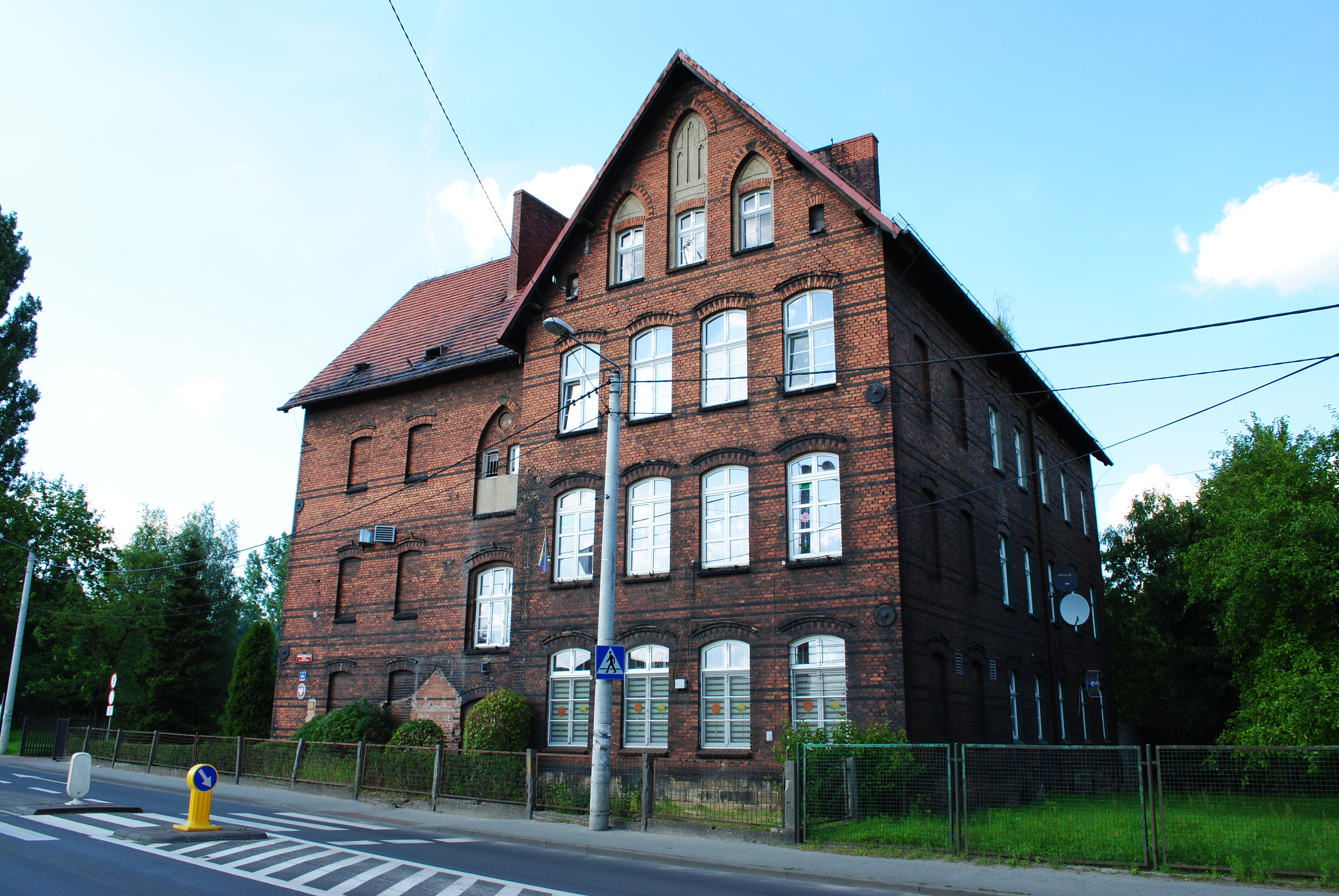
Municipal Kindergarten No. 62 at 61 Oswobodzenia Street in Janów

Educational activities in Janów-Nikiszowiec have been conducted since 1848. Previously, children from Janów attended school in Mysłowice, but due to population growth, discussions about building a new school in Janów were already underway as early as 1844. The school opened four years later, in 1848, on Oswobodzenia Street. In its first year of operation, 84 children attended the school, and a year later there were 116.

The further development of education in the district was linked to the construction of the Nikiszowiec housing estate – at that time, space was set aside for two schools. The first school, with 16 classrooms, was opened on 16 October 1911. At that time, classes began in four sections, attended by 217 students. Meanwhile, the population of Nikiszowiec was growing, so it was decided to build a second school, construction of which began in 1913. In June 1918, a nursery school for children was established, run by the Sisters of St. Hedwig.

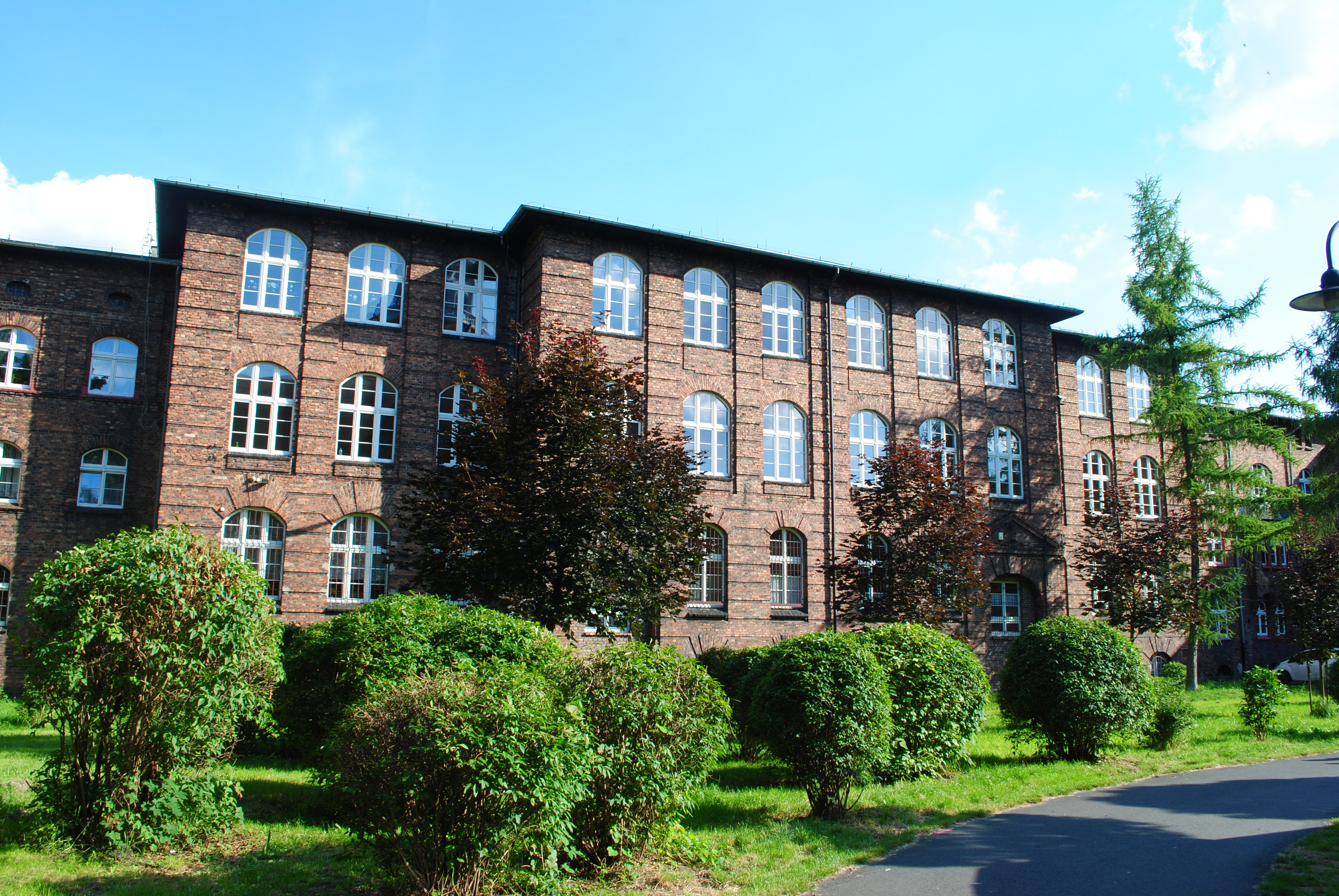
Primary School No. 53 at 18 Liberation Square in Nikiszowiec

In July 1924, when Nikiszowiec was incorporated into Gmina Janów, three schools in the estate came under its administration – at that time, the girls' public school was designated No. 3, the boys' school No. 4, and the German school No. 5. In addition, there were three kindergartens operating in Janów-Nikiszowiec – two of them run by the Sisters of St. Hedwig at 10 Zamkowa Street, and the third, a private one, operated by the German School Association in one of the classrooms of Public School No. 4. Starting in 1930, a three-year Rural Supplementary School was in operation. In 1964, the two elementary schools in Nikiszowiec were merged into a single institution – Stefan Żeromski Primary School No. 53, which remains in operation to this day. The Sisters of St. Hedwig ran the kindergarten until 1952, when the state authorities transferred it to lay administrators.

On 6 September 1980, the School of Life (renamed Special Primary School No. 6 in 1986) moved from Bogucice to the building at 92 Oswobodzenia Street, but the building was not adapted for students with disabilities. In 1994, the school moved to its current location at 2 Zamkowa Street, provided by the Wieczorek Coal Mine. Pursuant to the education reform reinstating the eight-year primary school system, on 23 November 2017, the soon-to-be-closed Juliusz Słowacki Junior High School No. 14, located at 47 Oswobodzenia Street, was merged with Primary School No. 53.

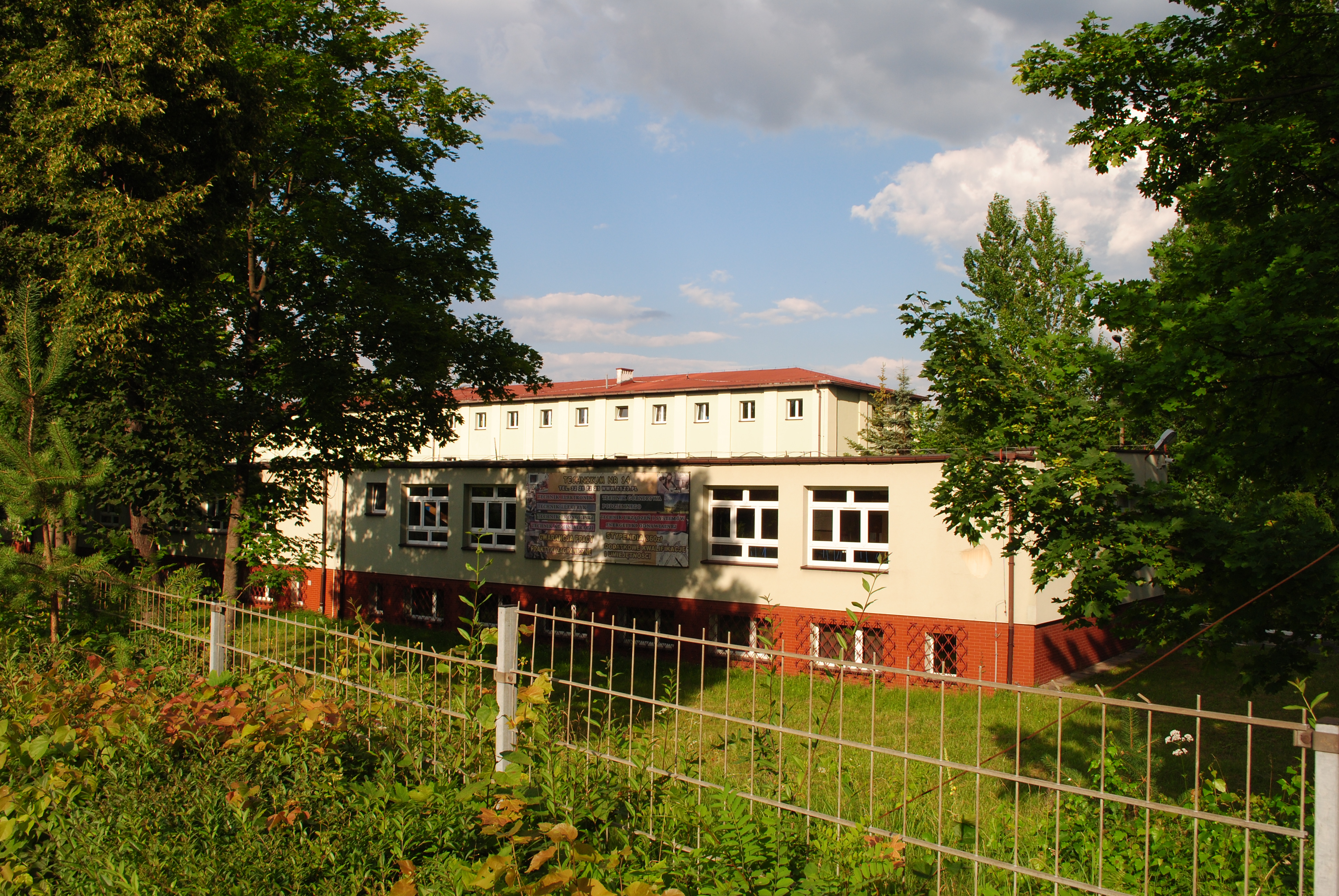
Adam Kocur Vocational School Complex No. 3

As of mid-August 2020, the following educational institutions are located in Janów-Nikiszowiec:

- Kindergartens:
  1. Municipal Kindergarten No. 32 (29 Szopienicka Street);
  2. Municipal Kindergarten No. 62 (61 Oswobodzenia Street);
  3. Plush Bear Municipal Kindergarten No. 63 (10 Zamkowa Street);
- Primary schools:
  1. Special Primary School No. 6 (2a Zamkowa Street);
  2. Stefan Żeromski Primary School No. 53 (three buildings: 18 Liberation Square; 58a Szopienicka Street; 47 Oswobodzenia Street);
- School complexes:
  1. Adam Kocur Vocational School Complex No. 3 (66 Szopienicka Street) – comprising Technical School No. 14 and Vocational School Grade I No. 4.

== Religion ==
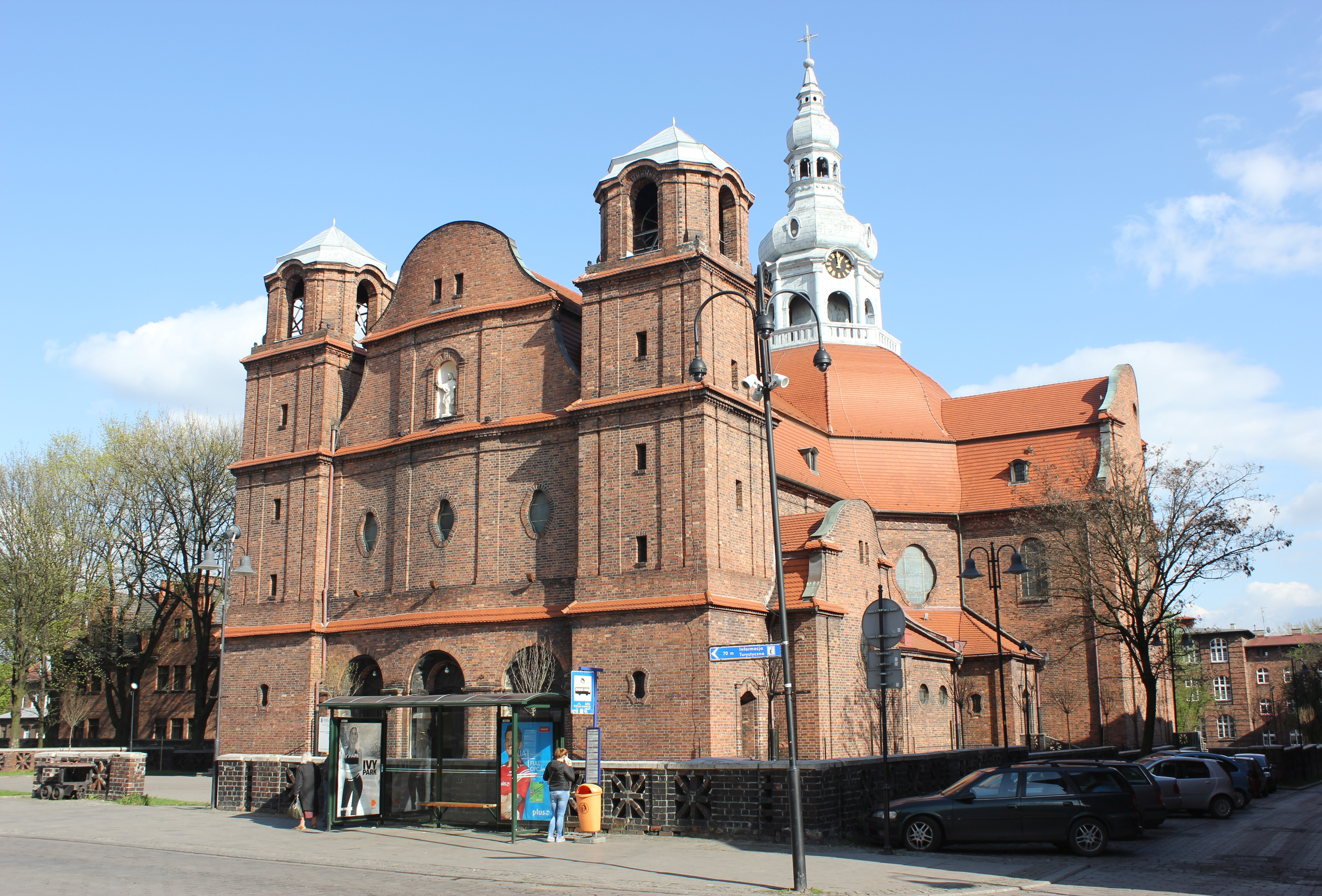
Roman Catholic Church of St. Anne at Liberation Square

The dominant religion in Janów-Nikiszowiec is Roman Catholicism. At the turn of the 19th and 20th centuries, the residents of the estate belonged to the Parish of the Sacred Heart of Jesus in Mysłowice. In 1902, the residents of Janów formed the Society of Catholic Citizens, which undertook the task of raising funds for the construction of a new church on the site. Originally, a church was planned for Janów, but due to mining damage in the designated area and the establishment of two new neighborhoods, the plans had to be changed. In 1908, the Georg von Giesches Erben company donated 60,000 marks for the construction of the church on the condition that the church be built according to plans approved by the company and be located in Nikiszowiec. At the company's request, plans and a cost estimate for the construction of the church and rectory were drawn up, and supervision of the construction was entrusted to Emil and Georg Zillmann.

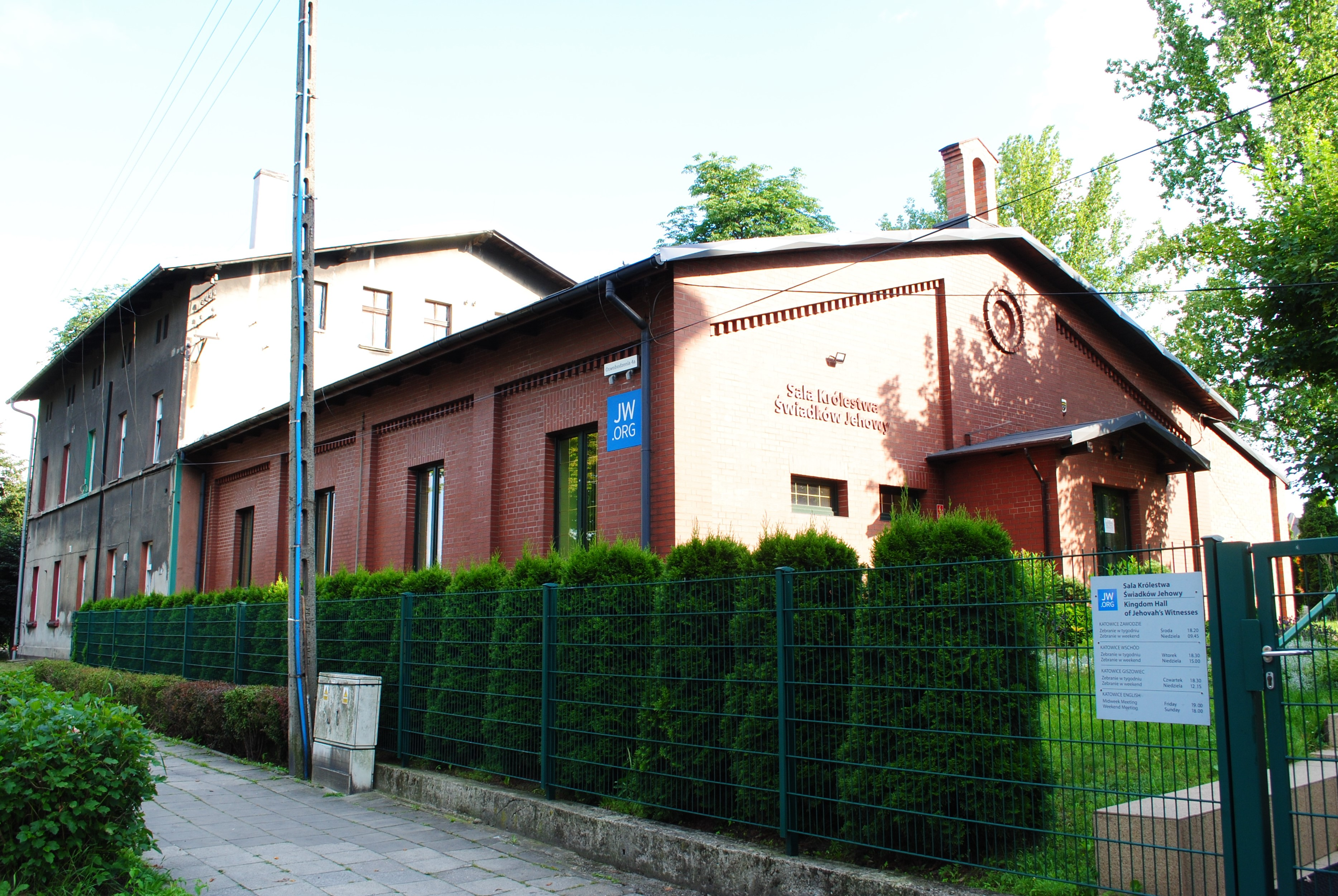
Kingdom Hall of Jehovah's Witnesses at 4a Oswobodzenia Street

Since the construction of the church was taking longer than expected, the company provided the boiler house building next to the Albert (Wojciech) shaft of the Giesche Coal Mine to serve as a temporary church. In October 1910, the makeshift church was consecrated, and in August 1912, an independent parish in Janów was separated from the Mysłowice parish. On 5 July 1914, the cornerstone for the new church was laid, but construction was halted a month later by the outbreak of World War I. Work resumed after the war and was completed in 1927.

The Roman Catholic Church remains the largest religious community in Janów-Nikiszowiec. In addition, at 4a Oswobodzenia Street, there is a Kingdom Hall of Jehovah's Witnesses, which serves congregations from the eastern districts of Katowice, as well as from Giszowiec and Zawodzie (Katowice–Angielski, Katowice–Giszowiec, Katowice–Wschód, Katowice–Zawodzie). Before World War II, Jews also lived there, attending the house of prayer in Szopienice.

The cemetery on Cmentarna Street belongs to the Parish of St. Anne. The cemetery covers an area of approximately 2.6 hectares.

== Culture ==
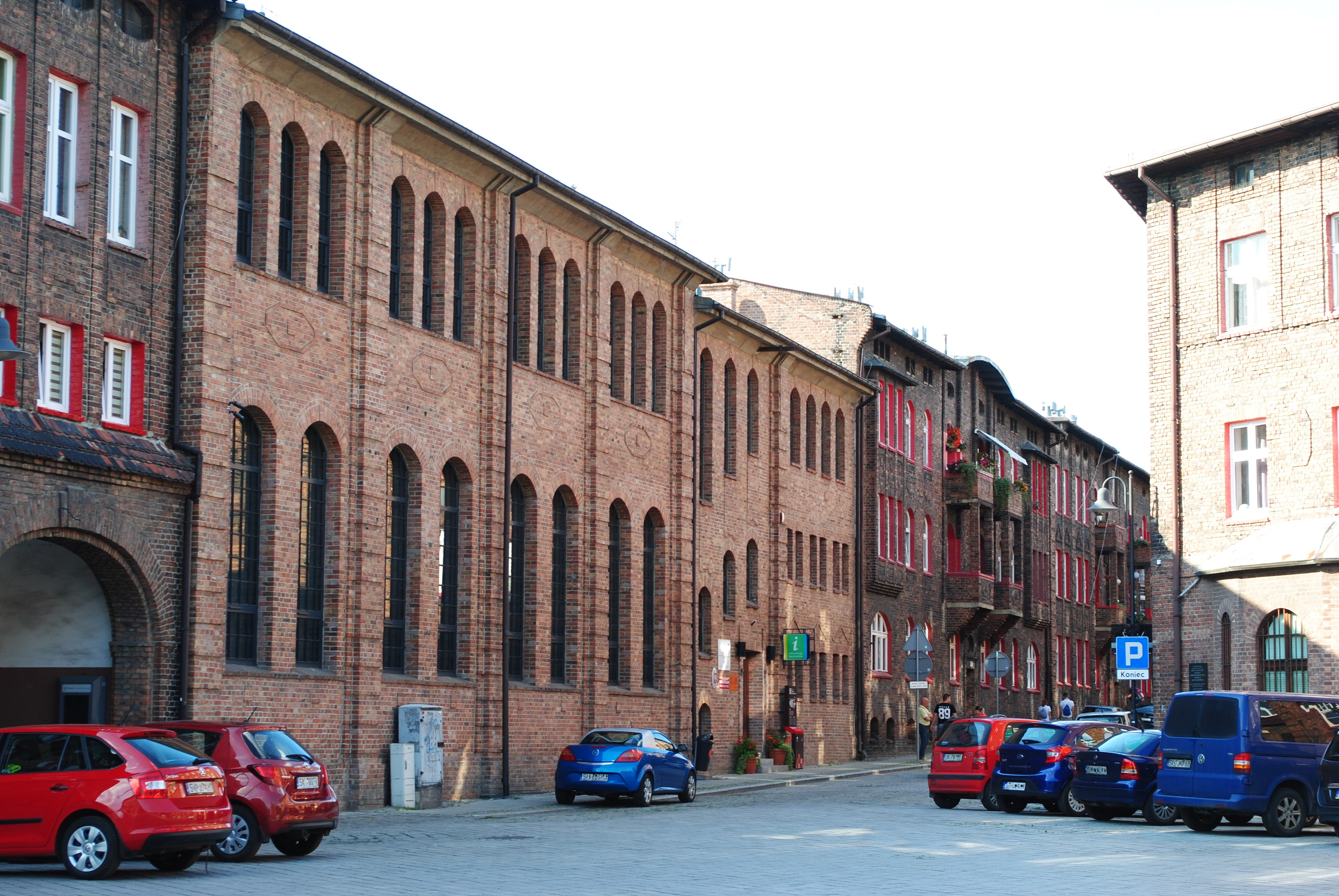
City Ethnology Department of the Katowice History Museum

Cultural activity in Janów-Nikiszowiec developed particularly rapidly during the interwar years. In 1937, there were 110 Polish socio-political and cultural organizations operating in Gmina Janów. Among the cultural organizations, the People's Libraries Society had been active since the Silesian Uprisings. Their library was located in the building of the boys' school in Nikiszowiec. In addition, numerous musical organizations were established, including a brass fire brigade orchestra founded in 1911 at the Giesche Coal Mine, which was reactivated after World War I as a miners' orchestra – Wiktor Bara served as its conductor at the time. Following reorganizations, it remained active until World War II. In addition, the Wolność mixed choir developed, which had 62 members in the year of its founding (1919). From 1927, the choir performed under the name Halka. The second choir established in Janów-Nikiszowiec was the Stanisław Moniuszko Men's Choir, founded on 1 November 1922. The German choir – Männergesang Verein Janow – was also active during that period.

After World War II, the cultural activities of the residents of Janów and Nikiszowiec were closely linked to the Wieczorek Coal Mine. As early as 1945, under the patronage of the Janów Branch of the Miners’ Trade Union, a company-run community center began operating. Initially, it hosted theater, tourism and sightseeing, chess, and gymnastics clubs. In 1951, Stefan Śniorz became the director, and a year later the community center was moved to a building on Liberation Square in Nikiszowiec. The next director was Otton Klimczok. During his tenure, meetings of amateur painting groups began to be organized, composed mostly of miners from the Wieczorek Coal Mine. This was the so-called Janów Group, and their works found their way into museums and private collections. Among the most prominent painters were Teofil Ociepka, Erwin Sówka, Paweł Wróbel, and Ewald Gawlik. In addition to the group of amateur painters, the Miners' Club organized classes for children and adults on various topics, including art, model-making, and photography. In 1968, the club's headquarters were moved from the building on Zamkowa Street, where the club had been operating since 1962, to the building of the former mine bathhouse. After the suicide of Otto Klimczok in 1969, who had previously stepped down as director, the community center never regained its former glory, and the club itself was closed in later years.

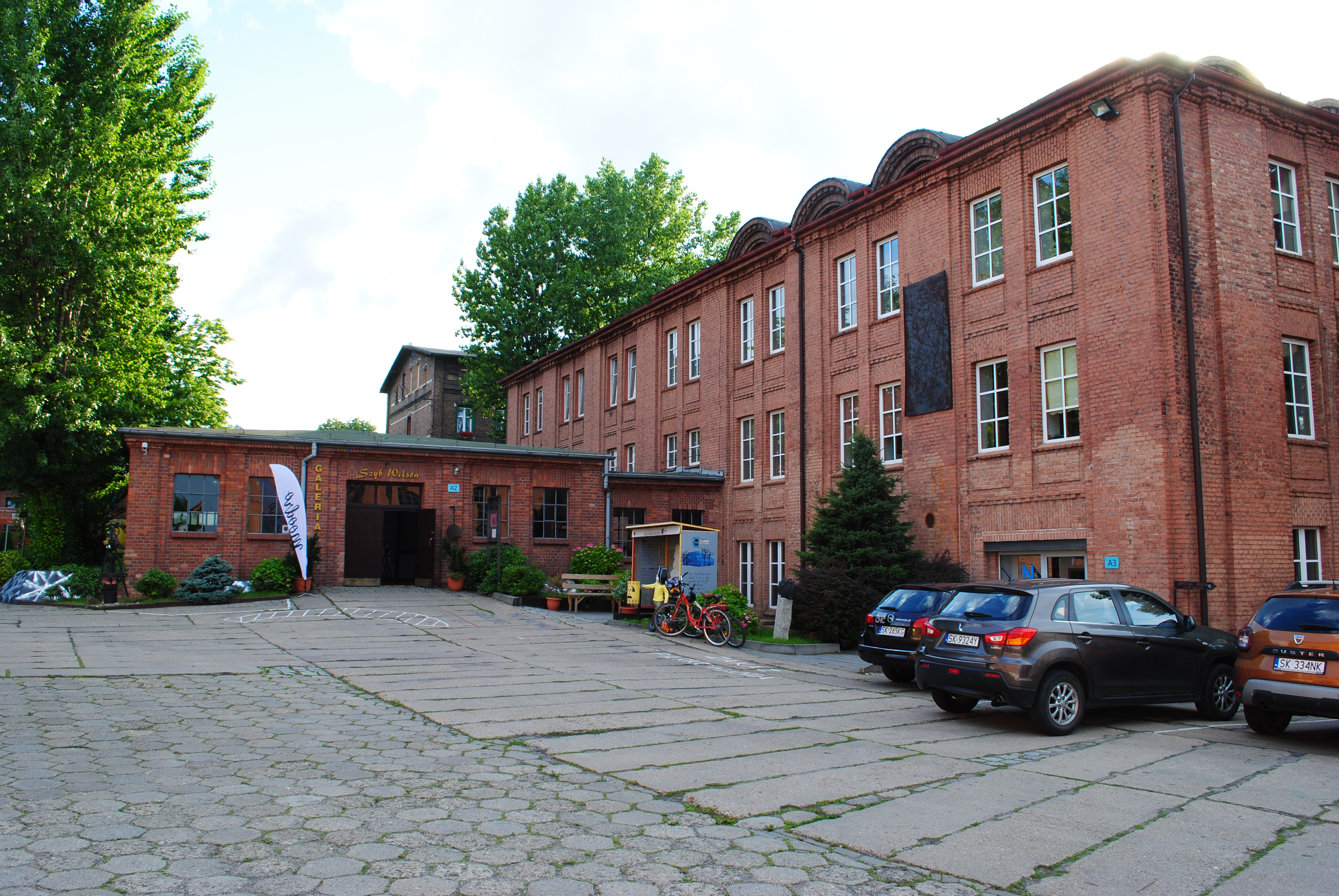
Szyb Wilson Gallery

During the Polish People's Republic period, musical ensembles resumed their activities, including the mine brass band, which had been reactivated in 1945. Wiktor Bara returned as conductor in 1957, and Henryk Wilczek took over in 1961. The band performed at various competitions, festivals, and events, and also participated in church and state ceremonies.

After 1989, due to the restructuring of the mining industry, the operation of the Company Cultural Center was discontinued. In 1994, the Social and Cultural Society of Giszowiec, Nikiszowiec, and Janów was established, which carried out activities aimed at promoting the history and heritage of these neighborhoods. The Wieczorek Coal Mine provided the headquarters – it was the building of the former laundry. Later, a memorial room was moved there, along with an exhibition of paintings by the Janów Group. From 1 August 2003, the building became a branch of the Katowice History Museum, where the Department of Urban Ethnology was established. In addition, in 1998, a private art gallery – Szyb Wilson Gallery – began operating in the buildings of the guild hall and marking room of the former Wilson shaft. The Wieczorek Coal Mine brass band also survived the years of transformation.

Branch No. 21 of the Katowice Public Library is located at 45 Zamkowa Street.

== Sport and recreation ==
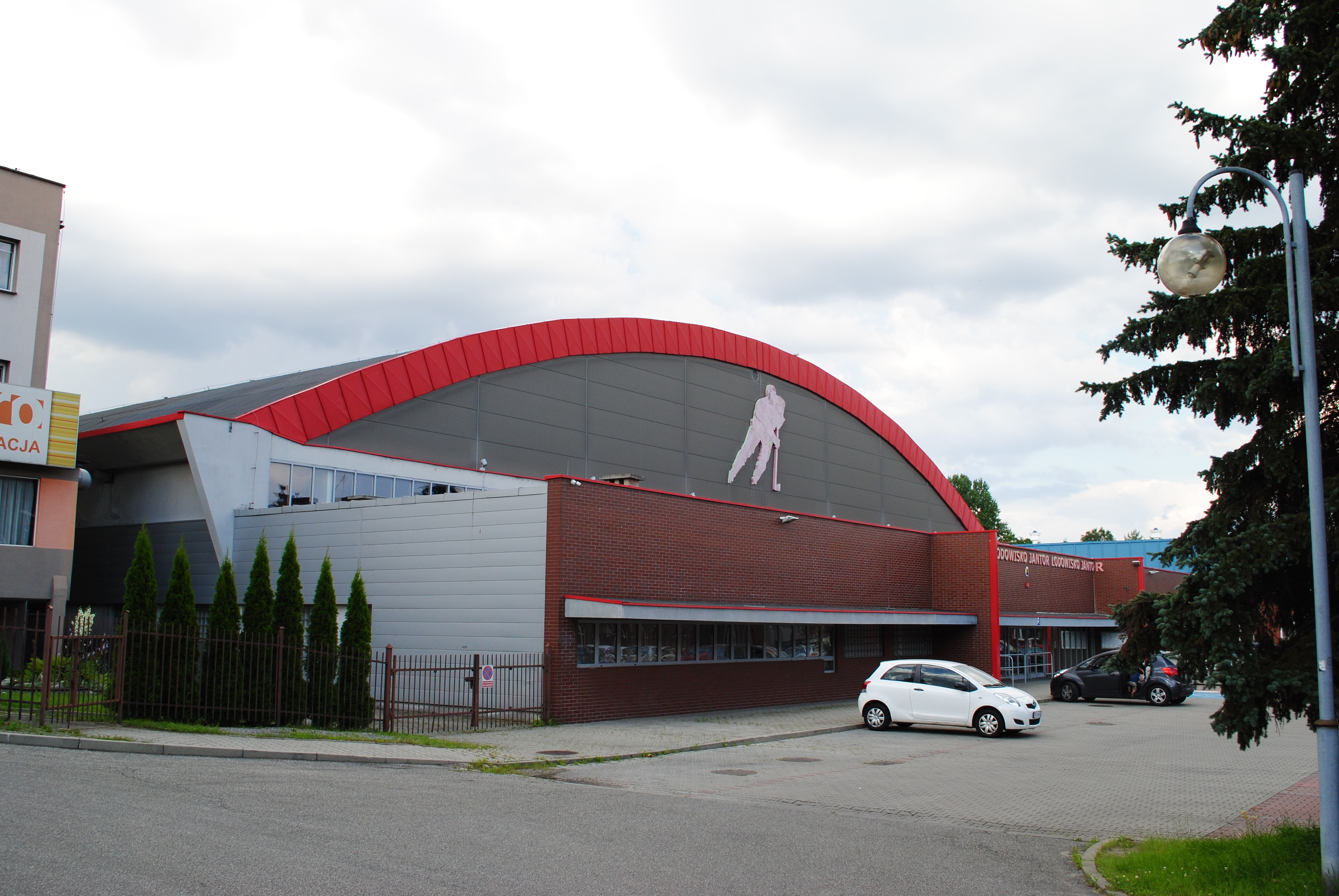
Jantor ice rink, used by the Naprzód Janów sports club

Sports in Janów-Nikiszowiec have been developing since the interwar years. One of the first sports organizations was the Sokół Polish Gymnastic Society, Nikisz-Giszowiec branch, founded on 16 February 1919. At the time, it had 135 members. It mainly promoted artistic gymnastics, as well as other sports such as basketball and athletics. A soccer club was likely established in 1919, which after the Third Silesian Uprising adopted the name Nikisz 20 Sports Club (renamed Pułaski Sports Club in 1938). A sports field was built near the Nikiszowiec housing estate, close to Block No. II. In Gmina Janów, the Giszowiec-Nikiszowiec 23 Swimming Society was established, founded by Jan Skupin, Karol Fischer, and Franciszek Waniek. Athletes used the Małgorzata Pond located in Giszowiec. On 15 December 1937, an indoor swimming pool was built in Nikiszowiec. The club produced many talented athletes, including Rozalia Kajzer-Piesiur and Jan Jędrysek. In 1931, the Rekord Janów Cycling Club was established in Nikiszowiec, where road cycling was practiced.

In 1945, the Naprzód Janów Workers' Sports Club was founded on the basis of Pułaski Sports Club, which operated a soccer section. In 1948, a second soccer club was established at the mine: the Janów Miners' Union Sports Club. A year later, the two clubs merged to form the Naprzód Janów Miners' Union Sports Club. The following year, another merger took place, resulting in the creation of Górnik Janów alongside two other clubs. It initially consisted of ten sections, though some were later dissolved. In 1957, the club was reorganized into the Naprzód Janów Miners Sports Club, which operated in Janów, Nikiszowiec, and Giszowiec, running four sections: hockey, soccer, canoeing, and swimming. In 1962, construction began on an ice rink near the soccer field in Nikiszowiec, which opened in 1964. Between 1968 and 1970, the Jantor sports complex was built, consisting of an ice rink, a café, a restaurant, and a sports hotel. The facility was expanded in 1982 to include a gymnasium and a fitness center.

After 1989, Naprzód Janów faced a severe crisis. Following the transfer of its sports facilities at no cost, several sports sections were dissolved, and the board had to seek other ways to finance the club. Inept management and debt led to the club's bankruptcy in 1997, and the ice rink was closed. The Katowice authorities took over the club's affairs and, on 24 September 2004, reopened the renovated Jantor ice rink. The Naprzód Janów club was also reactivated. The headquarters of the Silesian Ice Hockey Federation is located at 66 Szopienicka Street.

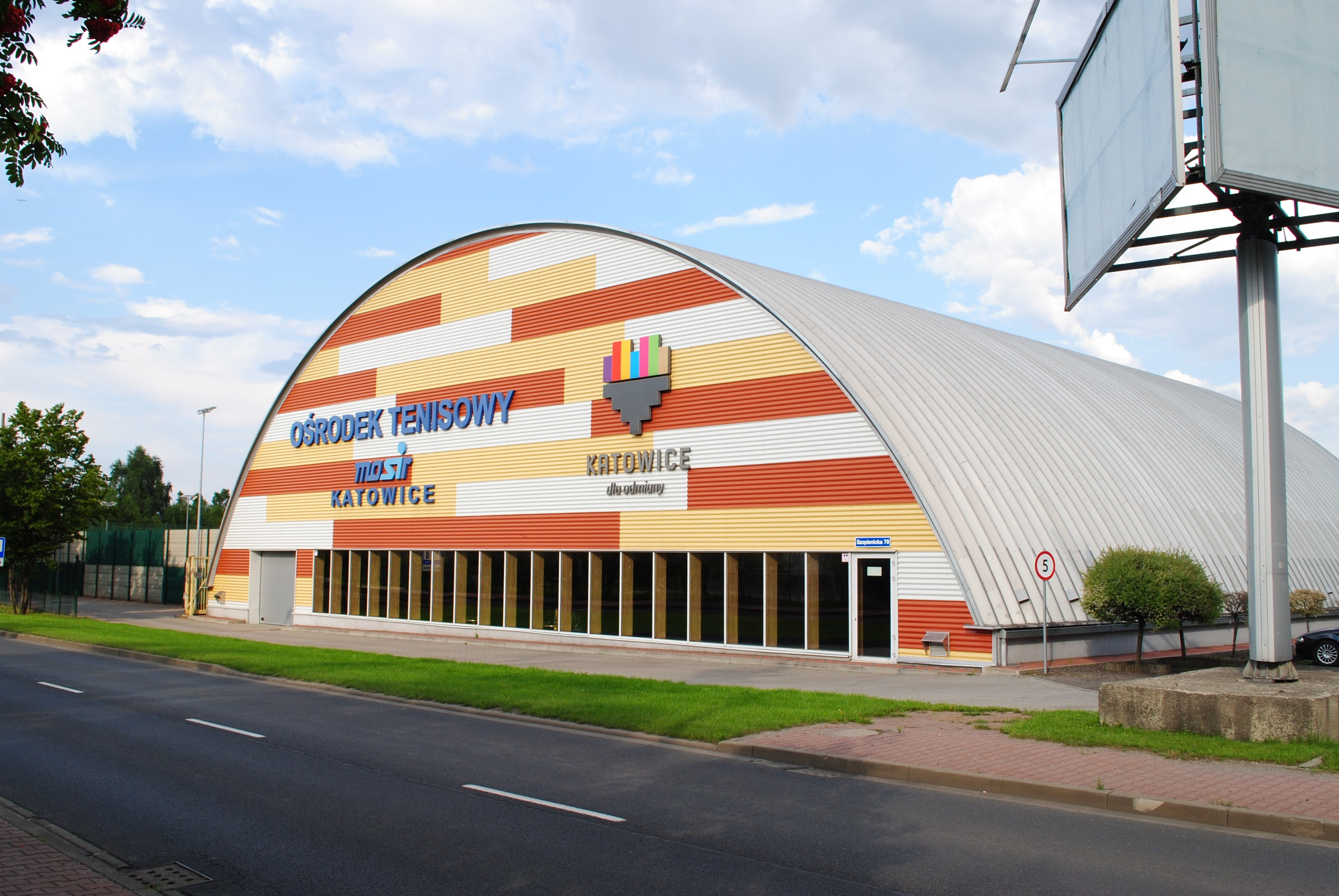
Katowice Tennis Center

In addition to ice hockey, Janów-Nikiszowiec also has a tennis club. The Tennis Center, managed by Katowice's Municipal Sports and Recreation Center, is located there. It includes a sports hall with two 38×40-meter courts, along with spectator seating and food service facilities, two indoor courts in air-supported structures, and six outdoor courts. The center is located at 70 Szopienicka Street. The Katowice Tennis Association – Katarzyna Pyka Tennis Academy has been operating there since 2015, organizing tennis classes.

== Public safety ==
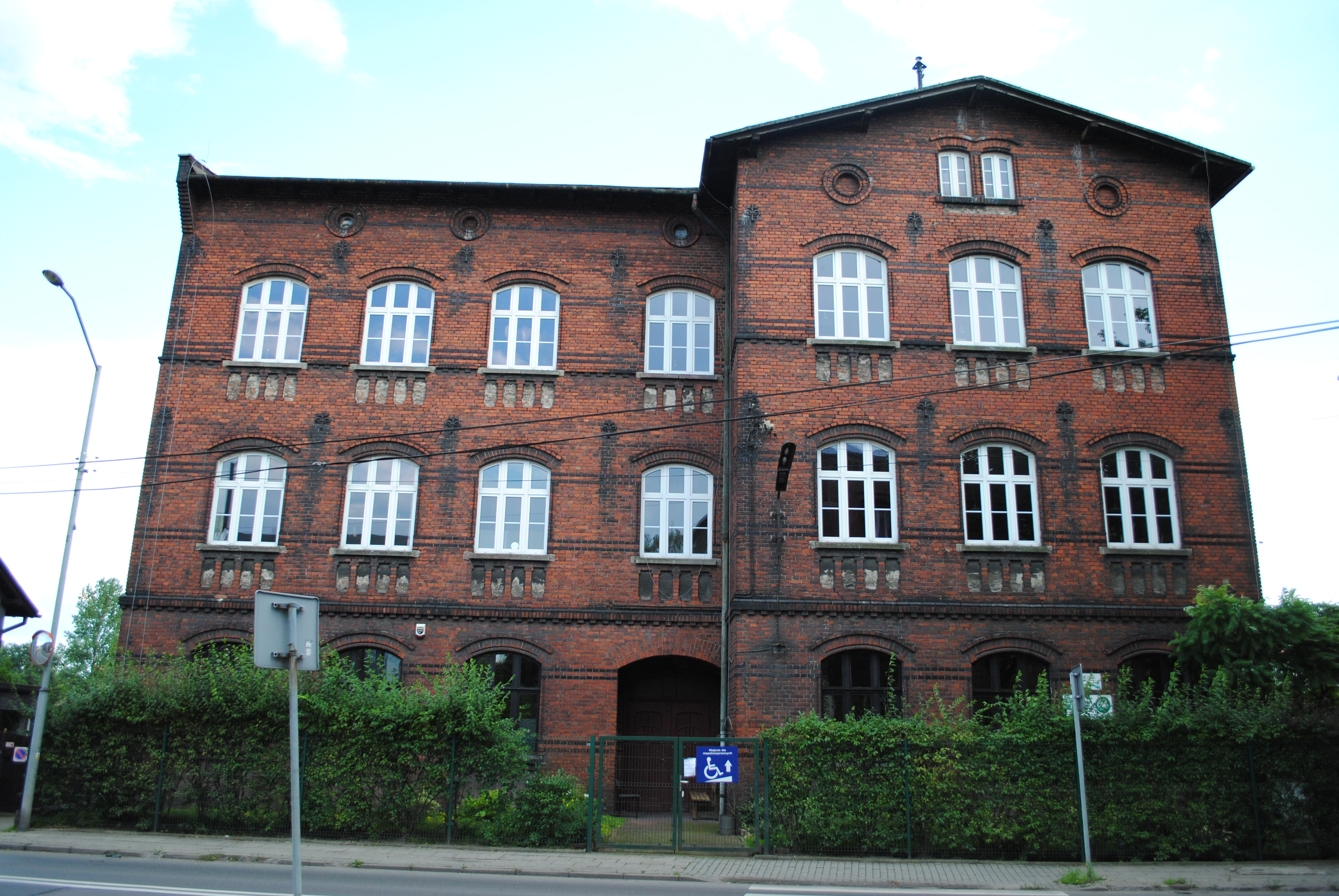
Community Self-Help Center at the Silesian Ad Vitam Dignam Association

Healthcare in Janów-Nikiszowiec had been provided since the establishment of the Nikiszowiec housing estate, but significant development of healthcare in the district occurred after World War II. In 1950, a Medical and Preventive Care Facility was established near the Wieczorek Coal Mine. It was originally housed in a former barrack for patients with infectious diseases. In addition to medical care, a 15-bed infirmary was located there from 1952 to 1953. In 1959, the Treatment and Prevention Center was moved to a new building on Ociepka Street.

As of mid-July 2020, the following healthcare facilities are located in Janów-Nikiszowiec:

- EPIONE Clinic No. 4 and the EPIONE Long-Term Care Facility (59 Szopienicka Street) – the clinic has a primary care office, 4 specialist offices, an ultrasound and ECG lab, rehabilitation rooms, and a laboratory;
- MAVIT Medical Center Specialist Hospital (65 Szopienicka Street) – a hospital specializing in otolaryngology, maxillofacial surgery, and ophthalmology;
- Community Self-Help Center at the Silesian Ad Vitam Dignam Association (92 Oswobodzenia Street) – a care facility for people with mental disorders.

In terms of public safety, Janów-Nikiszowiec was the 9th safest district in Katowice (out of 22 districts) in 2007, according to the crime rate, which stood at 2.70 crimes per 100 residents at the time (the average for Katowice as a whole was 3.08). Between 2004 and 2007, crime in the district declined – in 2004, the crime rate was 3.98 crimes per 100 people. In 2007, there were 20 traffic accidents in Janów-Nikiszowiec.

There are no police or fire stations in Janów-Nikiszowiec – the nearest ones are located in Szopienice-Burowiec. Located there is the Rescue and Firefighting Unit No. 1 of the State Fire Service (130 Krakowska Street), as well as Police Precinct No. 5 (7 Lwowska Street), which also serves Janów-Nikiszowiec.

== Bibliography ==
- Absalon, Damian; Czaja, Stanisław; Jankowski, Andrzej T. (2012). "Środowisko geograficzne" [Geographical Environment]. In Barciak, Antoni; Chojecka, Ewa; Fertacz, Sylwester (eds.). Katowice. Środowisko, dzieje, kultura, język i społeczeństwo [Katowice. Environment, History, Culture, Language and Society] (in Polish). Vol. 1. Katowice: Museum of History of Katowice. ISBN 978-83-8772-724-6.
- Drobniak, Adam; Polko, Adam; Plac, Klaudia (2014). Diagnoza sytuacji społeczno-ekonomicznej Miasta Katowice wraz z wyznaczeniem obszarów rewitalizacji i analizą strategiczną [Diagnosis of the Socio-Economic Situation of the City of Katowice, Including the Identification of Revitalisation Areas and Strategic Analysis] (PDF) (in Polish). Katowice: City of Katowice. ISBN 978-83-61061-97-7.
- Matuszek, Piotr (2008). "„Katowickie" osiedle potomków Gieschego" ["Katowice" Housing Estate of the Giesche Heirs]. In Matuszek, Piotr; Tofilska, Joanna; Złoty, Andrzej (eds.). Nikiszowiec, Giszowiec i inne osiedla Katowic [Nikiszowiec, Giszowiec and Other Katowice Housing Estates] (in Polish). Katowice: State Archive. ISBN 978-83-7593-005-4.
- Seidl, Kurt; Langer, Mirosław (1995). Mieszkania robotnicze w górnośląskim przemyśle górniczym [Workers' Housing in Upper Silesian Mining Industry] (in Polish). Katowice: Krajowa Agencja Wydawnicza na zlecenie KWK "Staszic". ISBN 83-03-03672-6.
- Szaraniec, Lech (1996). Osady i osiedla Katowic [Settlements and Housing Estates of Katowice] (in Polish). Katowice: Artur. ISBN 83-905115-0-9.
- Tofilska, Joanna (2007). Katowice Nikiszowiec: miejsce, ludzie, historia [Katowice Nikiszowiec: Place, People, History] (in Polish). Katowice: Museum of the History of Katowice. ISBN 978-83-87727-68-0.
- Tokarska-Guzik, Barbara; Rostański, Adam; Kupka, Roman (2002). Katowice. Przyroda miasta [Katowice. Nature of the City] (in Polish). Katowice: Kubajak. ISBN 83-87971-49-9.
- Wilczok, Emanuel (1991). Janów: od osady leśnej do gminy wielkoprzemysłowej [Janów: From a Forest Settlement to a Large Industrial Gmina] (in Polish). Katowice: Księgarnia św. Jacka.
- Zemła, Marek, ed. (25 April 2012). Studium uwarunkowań i kierunków zagospodarowania przestrzennego miasta Katowice – II edycja. Część 1. Uwarunkowania zagospodarowania przestrzennego [Study of the Conditions and Directions of Spatial Development of the City of Katowice – Second Edition. Part One. Conditions of Spatial Development] (PDF) (in Polish). Katowice: Biuro Rozwoju Regionu.
