= Prezydent Shaft =

Former mine shaft headframe and heritage complex in Chorzów, Poland

- Szyb Prezydent
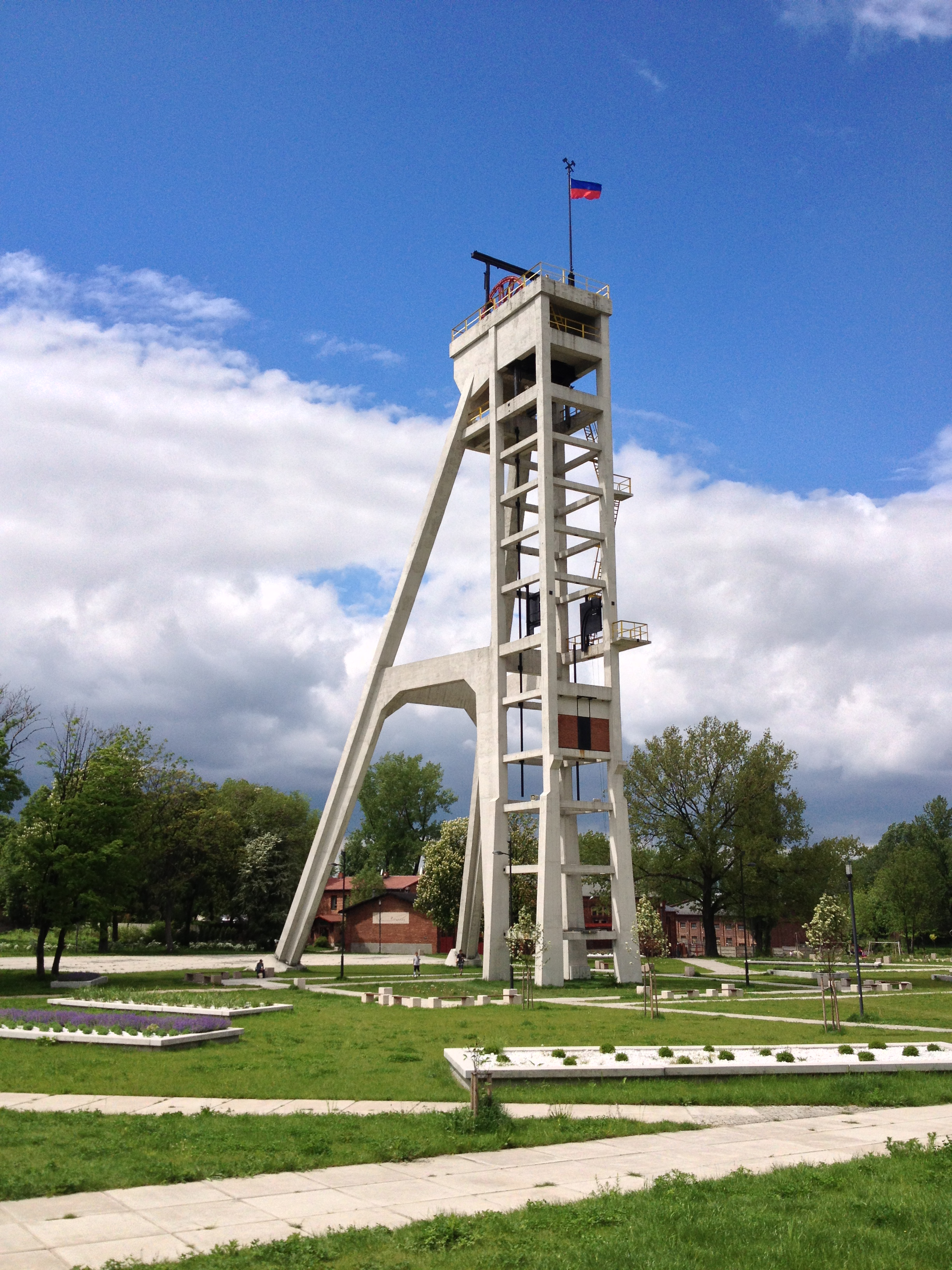
- The headframe of the Prezydent Shaft
- Interactive map of the Prezydent Shaft area

General information
- Location: Chorzów, Silesian Voivodeship, Poland
- Coordinates: 50°17′53″N 18°58′02″E
- Completed: 1933

Height
- Height: 42 m

Technical details
- Structural system: Reinforced concrete

Design and construction
- Architect: Ryszard Heileman

Prezydent Shaft (Polish: Szyb Prezydent) is a former coal-mine headframe (winding tower) in Chorzów, Silesian Voivodeship, Poland. The reinforced-concrete, single-strut tower is about 42 metres tall and carries two rope sheaves 5.5 metres in diameter. It forms part of the Sztygarka complex, which reuses surviving mine buildings—including former foremen's housing—for hospitality and cultural events. The site is included in the Silesian Industrial Monuments Route.

== History ==
The shaft headframe was built in 1933 to serve a section of the historical Król/Königsgrube coal mine; its construction was financed by the Polish–French company Skarboferm and designed by engineer Ryszard Heileman of Katowice, who drew on French technological patterns. The shaft was initially named Wielki Jacek and from 1937 took the name Prezydent, in honour of Ignacy Mościcki.

In 1972 the Prezydent mine was incorporated as a district into the Polska mine in Świętochłowice; mining in the wider complex ended in the 1990s, and some surface buildings were demolished in 1996.

== Architecture ==
The headframe is a brace-type (single-strut) reinforced-concrete tower. It retains two parallel rope sheaves with a diameter of 5.5 metres. According to the Industrial Monuments Route description, together with associated equipment (including a 10-ton skip) it was designed for an output exceeding 320 tonnes of coal per hour.

== Heritage protection and present use ==
The headframe is entered in the register of immovable monuments of the Silesian Voivodeship under reference number A/228/08 (24 October 2008).

The adjacent Sztygarka complex comprises historic mine buildings adapted for hospitality and events (restaurant, guest rooms and cultural/event spaces), including the former foremen's residential building (mieszkania sztygarów).
