= Michalina Mościcka =

First Lady of Poland between 1926 and 1932

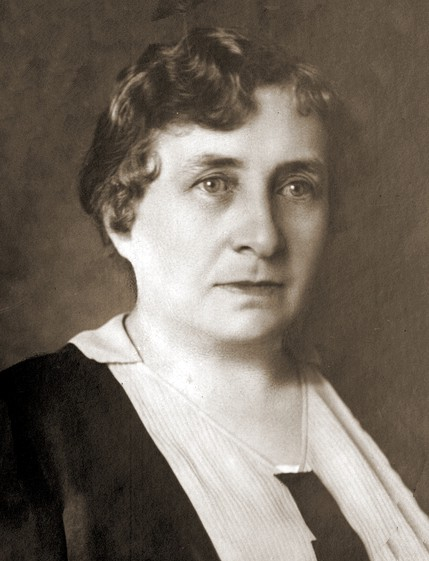
- Mościcka before 1931

First Lady of Poland
- In office 4 June 1926 – 18 August 1932
- President: Ignacy Mościcki
- Preceded by: Maria Wojciechowska
- Succeeded by: Maria Mościcka

Personal details
- Born: Michalina Czyżewska; 20 December 1871 Klice, Congress Poland, Russian Empire
- Died: 18 August 1932 (aged 60) Spała, Poland
- Resting place: Powązki Cemetery, Warsaw
- Spouse: Ignacy Mościcki (m. 1892)
- Children: 5

Michalina Mościcka (née Czyżewska; 20 December 1871 – 18 August 1932) was a Polish politician and activist who was the First Lady of Poland as the wife of Ignacy Mościcki from 1926 until her death. She advocated for women's rights and Polish independence, organised charities for destitute children and flood victims, and managed medical aid to Polish soldiers during World War I.

== Early life ==
Mościcka was born into an impoverished noble family. She was the daughter of the owner of a small manor and clerk, Aleksander Fortunat Czyżewski and Agnieszka Czyżewska (née Mościcka). She graduated from a gymnasium in Płock and was later certified as a teacher.

In 1892, she married her cousin, Ignacy Mościcki. They took part in conspiratorial activities against Russian officials and Mościcka manufactured and smuggled nitroglycerin used in attacks, delivering it to given addresses hidden in baskets. After her husband was threatened with life imprisonment in Siberia for his political activities, they immigrated to London where she worked as a tutor and had her first two children.

== Activism ==
In 1897, Mościcka and her family immigrated to Fribourg in Switzerland for her husband's academic career where she hosted meetings of the local Polish community in their home.

In the autumn of 1912, they returned to Poland and settled in Lviv where she began actively participating in feminist and Polish independence organisations. She was one of the leaders of the Progressive Women's Political Club and an activist in the Women's Equality Union and the People's School Society women's circle.

During World War I, Mościcka took part in the Battle of Lemberg as part of the Galician and Silesian Women's League, organising the couriers and humanitarian aid, as well as managing the finances of the local wing of the Polish Military Organisation. In 1916, she became a member of the management of the League, which later transformed into the Polish Women's Citizens' Committee. In 1917, she joined the main committee of the League of Polish Independence. She was a member of the Citizens' Committee for Aid to Repatriates.

In 1919, Mościcka was elected to the Lviv City Council. In 1922, she ran for a Senate seat from Polish Women's League lists, representing the Progressive Women's Political Club. Despite gaining a lot of attention from the media, none of the candidates, including Mościcka, were elected.

Between 1920 and 1924, she was president of the general board of the Polish Women's League. She was later president of the Lviv branch of Women's Military Readiness between 1924 and 1926. According to Felicjan Sławoj Składkowski she convinced her husband to take on the role of president, as offered by Józef Piłsudzki following the May Coup.

== First Lady of Poland ==
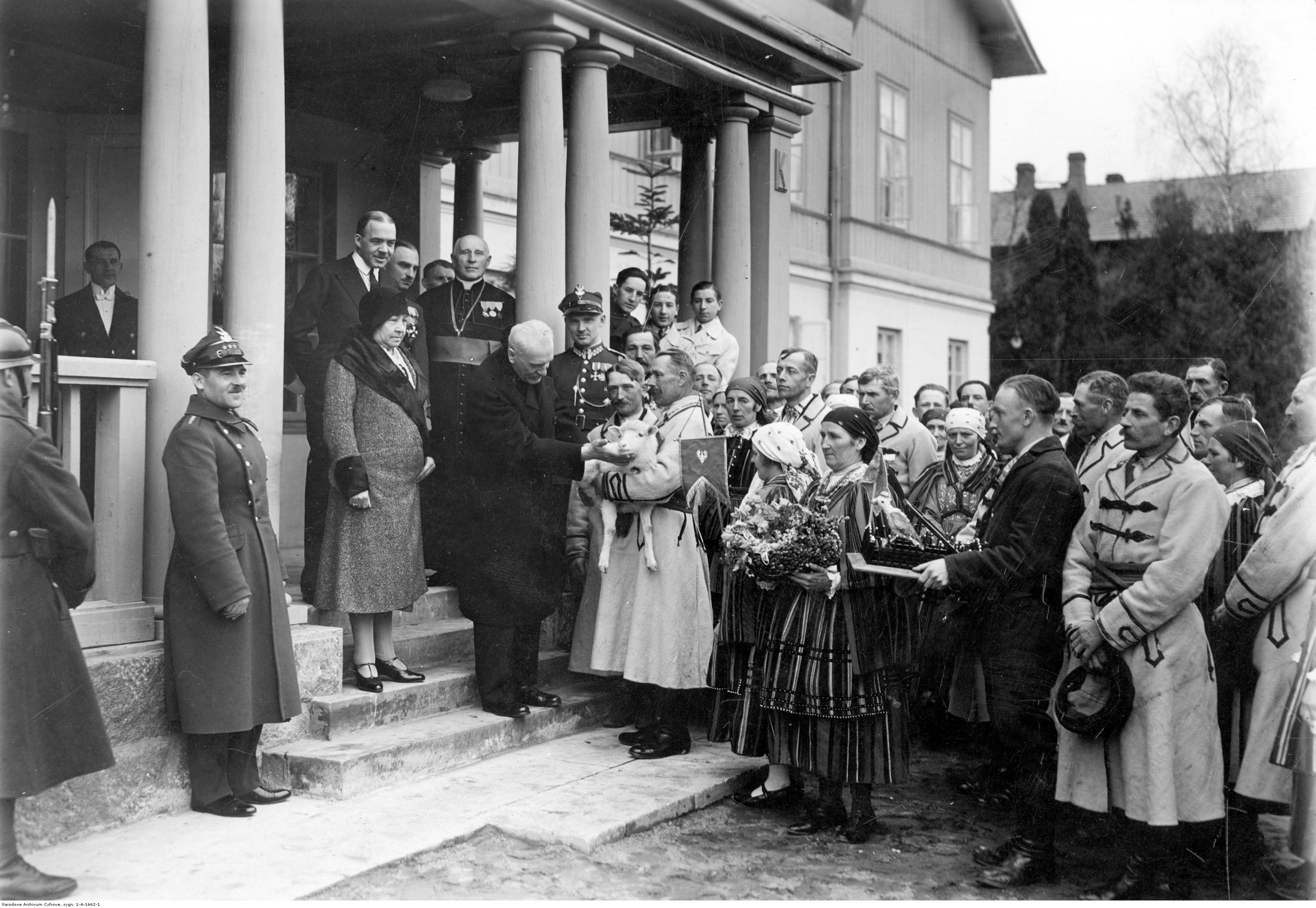
Michalina with her husband accepting Easter gifts in Spała (1930)

Upon becoming the First Lady of Poland in 1926, Mościcka continued her activist work, remaining active in and contributing to social and feminist causes.

Following the 1927 Lesser Poland floods, she founded and headed the Central Social Committee to Help Flood Victims. The donations gathered by the organisation covered not only assistance for victims of the flood, but were also spent on other initiatives like setting up new health centres in the flooded areas.

Mościcka created and managed a care home for orphaned and impoverished children in Spała. The residence housed over 50 homeless children. She led conferences advocating for giving help to children in need, as well as leading an effort to establish nurseries for infants, create and build exemplary educational and care institutions, and educate personnel to staff them.

She became a protector of the Organization of Women's Adaptation for National Defense. In 1930, she was made honorary member of the "Rodzina Wojskowa" Association. She was the first honorary president of the Women's Civic Labour Association.

Mościcka funded the creation of a sanatorium in Liszna, where the Mościcka Health Centre was later established. Along with Aleksandra Piłsudska, she was the patron of the founding of the independence period archive and the publication of the two-volume publication "Wierna służba" and "Służba ojczyźnie."

== Personal life and death ==
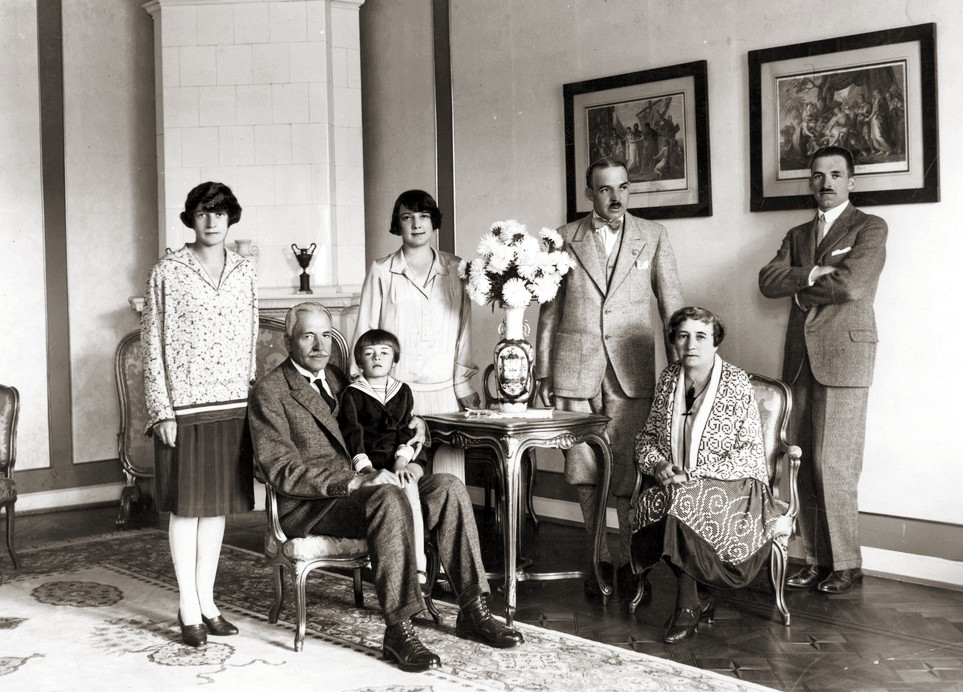
Michalina Mościcka (2nd from the right) with her husband, four children and granddaughter.

She had five children with Ignacy Mościcki. Their first daughter died in early childhood. They later had Michał (1894–1961), Helena (1897–1962), Józef (1898–1955) and Franciszek (1899–1927).

In 1930, her heart disease worsened. She underwent painful procedures to remedy it while continuing to work. Mościcka died at 12:00 on 18 August 1932. Her funeral was held on 20 August 1932 at St. John's Archcathedral in Warsaw and she was buried in her family tomb at the Powązki Cemetery.

== Awards ==
- Order of Polonia Restituta (posthumously, 1932)
- Cross of Independence
- Cross of the defence of Lviv
- Commemorative badge of the Polish Military Organisation
