= Ignacy Mościcki Memorial =

Monument in Warsaw, Poland

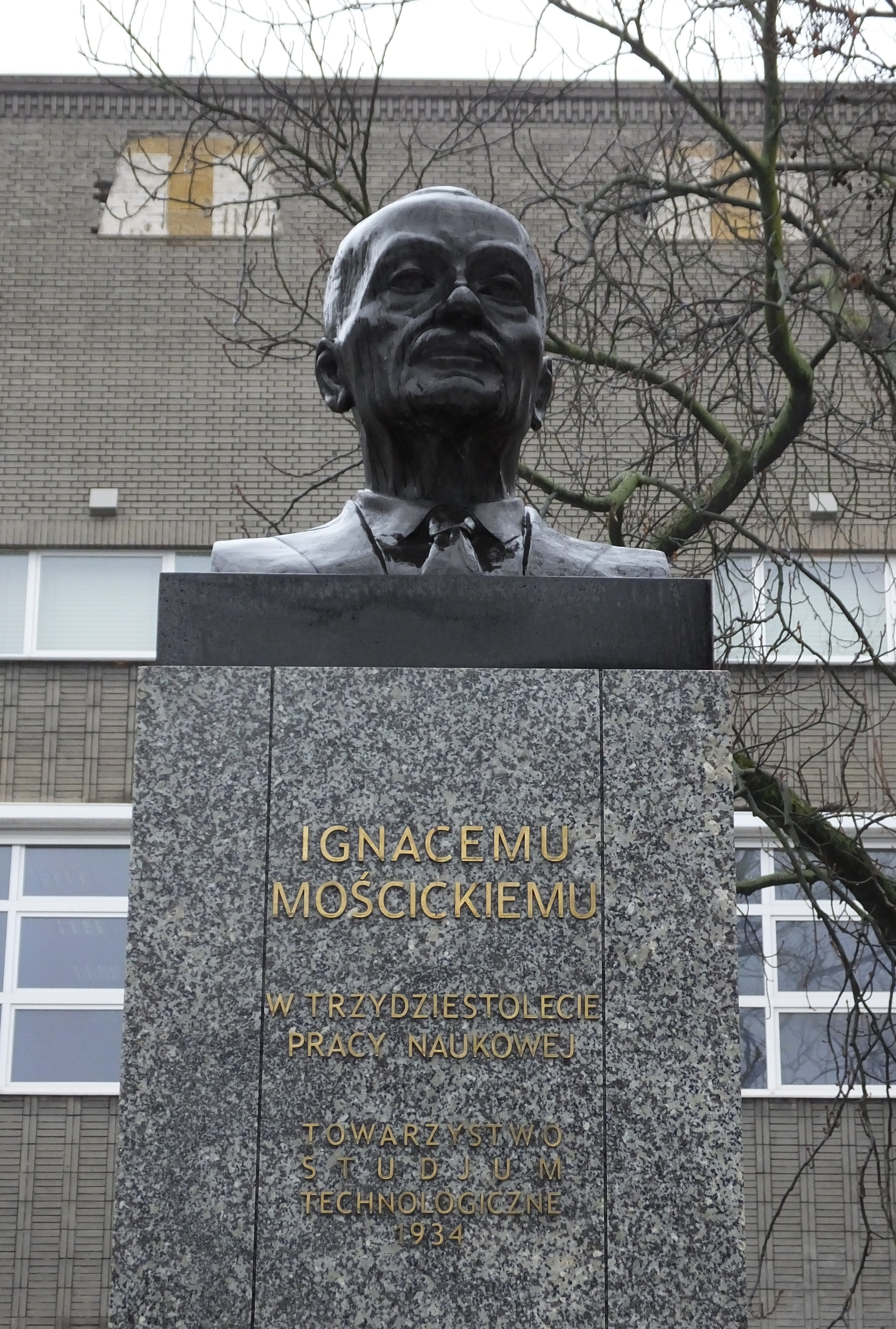
- The monument in 2019.
- Interactive map of Ignacy Mościcki Memorial
- Location: 75 Koszykowa Street, Downtown, Warsaw, Poland
- Coordinates: 52.222053°N 21.005795°E
- Designer: Stanisław Lewandowski (original); Anna Getler (replica); Piotr Grzegorz Mądrach (replica)
- Type: Bust
- Material: bronze (bust); granite (pedestal)
- Opening date: 7 December 1934 (original); 14 December 2018 (replica)
- Dedicated to: Ignacy Mościcki

The Ignacy Mościcki Memorial (Polish: Pomnik Ignacego Mościckiego) is a bronze bust on a granite pedestal in Warsaw, Poland, placed in front of the building of the Faculty of Chemistry of the Warsaw University of Technology at 75 Koszykowa Street. It is dedicated to Ignacy Mościcki, a 19th- and 20th-century chemist and politician, who was the President of Poland from 1926 to 1939. The monument, unveiled on 14 December 2018, is a replica of a sculpture that was placed at the location on 7 December 1934, and destroyed in 1939. The original was designed by Stanisław Lewandowski, while the replica, by Anna Getler and Piotr Grzegorz Mądrach.

== History ==
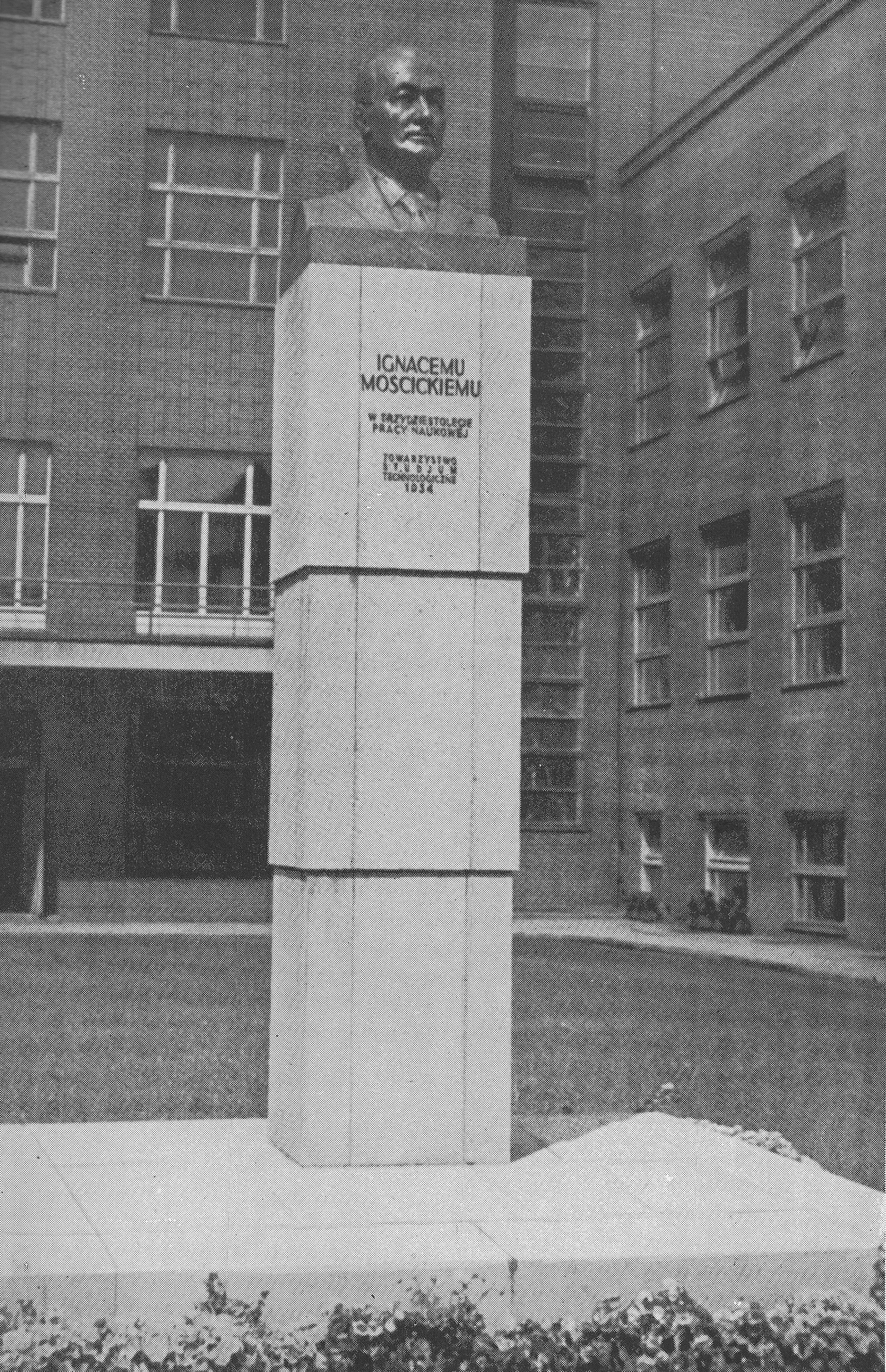
The original monument in the 1930s.

The original monument was designed by Stanisław Lewandowski, and unveiled on 7 December 1934. It was erected to commemorate 30th anniversary of Ignacy Mościcki scientific work in the chemistry field. It was destroyed in 1939, during the Second World War.

After the conflict, in its place was erected an obelisk dedicated to teachers and students of the Warsaw University of Technology, that died during the war.

On 14 December 2018, as part of the celebrations of the 100th National Independence Day of Poland, in the location was unveiled the exact replica of the monument. It was designed by Anna Getler and Piotr Grzegorz Mądrach, basing on the original project. The obelisk was moved to the southern wall of the building of the Faculty of Chemistry, near Independence Avenue.

== Characteristics ==
The monument is placed in front of the building of the Faculty of Chemistry of the Warsaw University of Technology at 75 Koszykowa Street. It consists of a bronze bust of Ignacy Mościcki, a 19th- and 20th-century chemist and politician, who was the President of Poland from 1926 to 1939. It is placed on a granite pedestal, with the following inscription:

Polish inscription

Ignacemu Mościckiemu
w trzydziestolecie pracy naukowej

Towarzystwo Studjum Technologiczne
1934

Translation:
English language

To Ignacy Mościcki
in the 30th anniversary of his scientific work

The Association of Technological Studies
1934
