= Szyb Wilson Gallery =

- Galeria Szyb Wilson
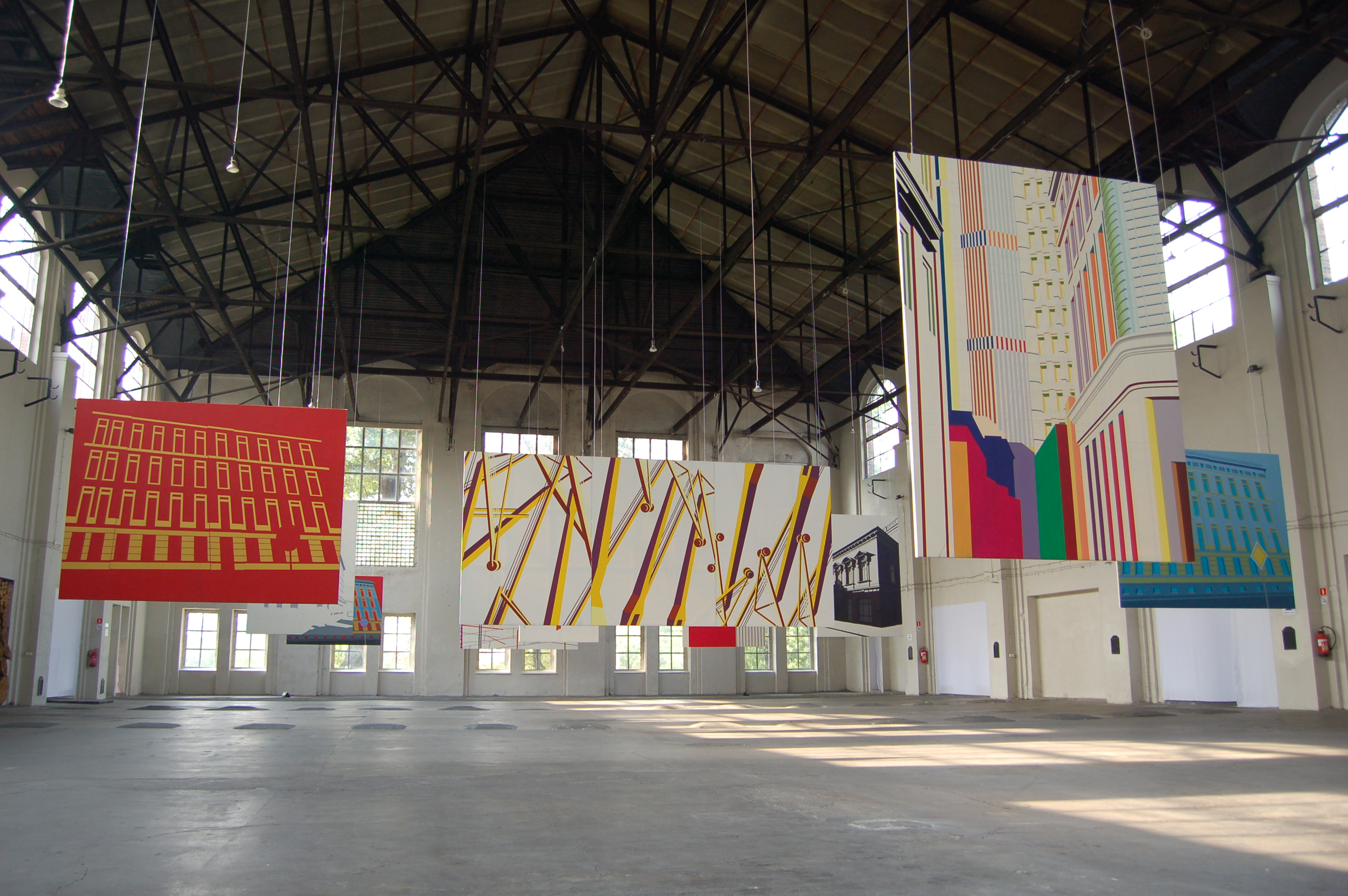
- Szyb Wilson Gallery – Large Gallery – exhibition of Marian Solisz, 9 October 2009 – 1 January 2010
- Established: 2001
- Location: Katowice, Poland
- Coordinates: 50.2506712°N 19.0834558°E
- Type: contemporary art gallery
- Director: Monika Paca
- Owner: Eko-Art Foundation
- Website: http://www.szybwilson.org

Szyb Wilson Gallery (Polish: Galeria Szyb Wilson) is a contemporary art gallery in Katowice, Poland, located at 1 Oswobodzenia Street in the Janów-Nikiszowiec district. It was opened in 2001 in the revitalized building of the pithead and bathhouse of the Wilson shafts of the Wieczorek Coal Mine, whose history dates back to 1826.

The founders of the gallery are Monika Paca (Monika Paca-Bros) and Johann Bros. The main aim of the gallery, alongside the social revitalization of the district, is the promotion of young, engaged artists and the presentation of Polish and international contemporary art. In addition to art exhibitions and festivals, the gallery hosts concerts, theatre performances, art workshops and conferences. It serves as a place for meetings and for expanding public discourse.

Szyb Wilson Gallery is the largest private art gallery in Poland, with an exhibition area of nearly 2,500 m^{2}.

== Building history and adaptation ==
The gallery occupies the former pithead complex of the Wilson (formerly Richthofen) shaft of the Giesche mine (today associated with the Wieczorek mine), comprising the pithead building with the miners’ marking hall and the bathhouse facilities. According to heritage and tourism descriptions, the key buildings of the complex date from 1918 and were designed by architects Emil and Georg Zillmann, known for their role in shaping the local industrial-era urban fabric (including the Nikiszowiec workers’ estate).

After the decline of mining operations on the site, the historic industrial interiors were adapted for cultural use and opened as a contemporary art gallery in 2001, retaining the large-scale post-industrial spatial character that enables large exhibitions and events. The complex is also described in academic literature as an example of adaptive reuse of post-industrial facilities for art, with the gallery program inserted into the historic fabric rather than replacing it with a new-build extension.

Municipal documentation describing local industrial heritage identifies the former Wilson shaft complex at Oswobodzenia 1 / Szopienicka (Janów) as a group of historic mining buildings, including the bathhouse and marking hall, gatehouse, former engine house and boiler house, and parts of the former coal sorting infrastructure.

== Selected exhibitions and artists exhibiting their works at Szyb Wilson ==
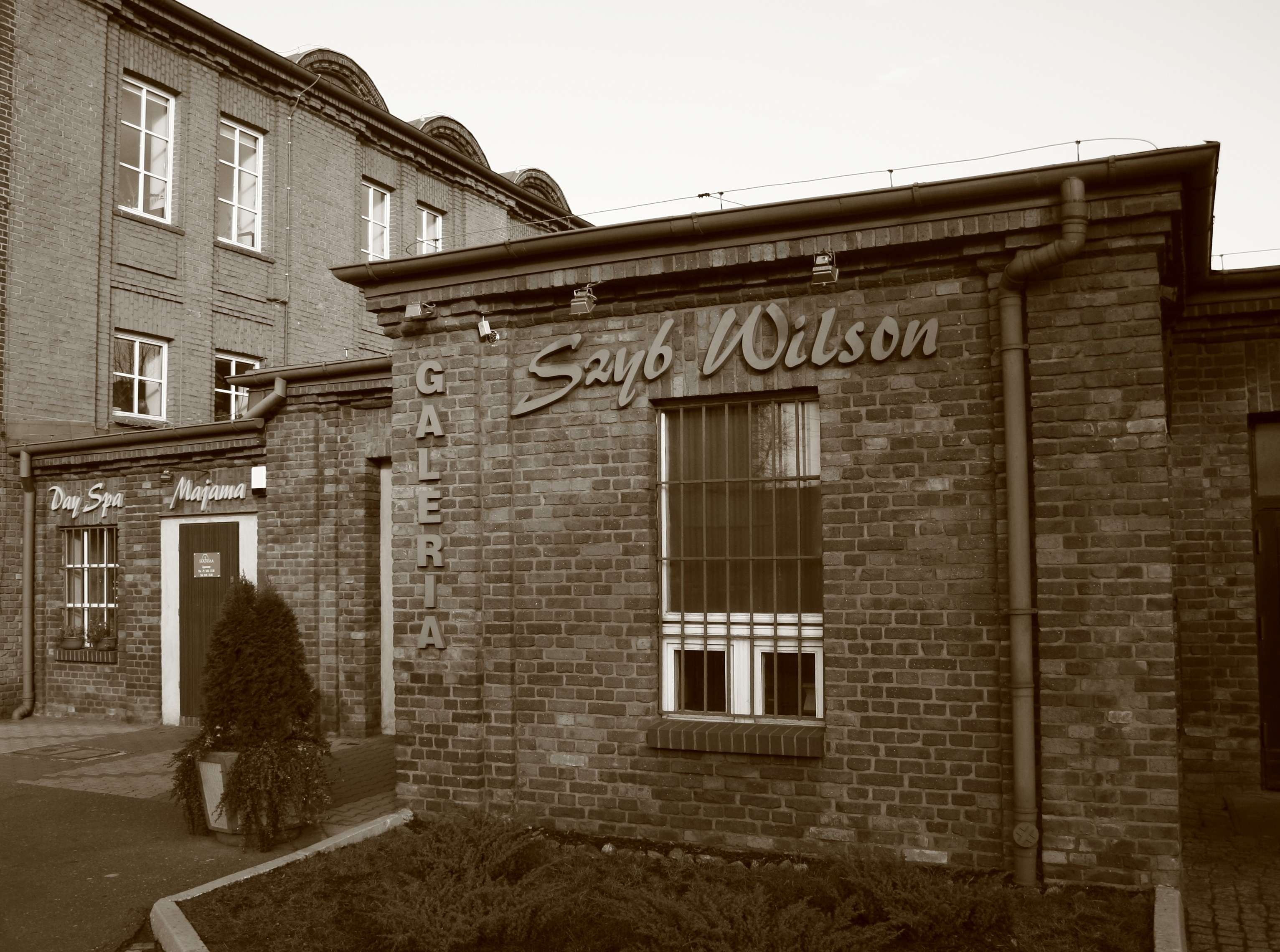
Szyb Wilson Gallery in Janów-Nikiszowiec, Oswobodzenia Street 1

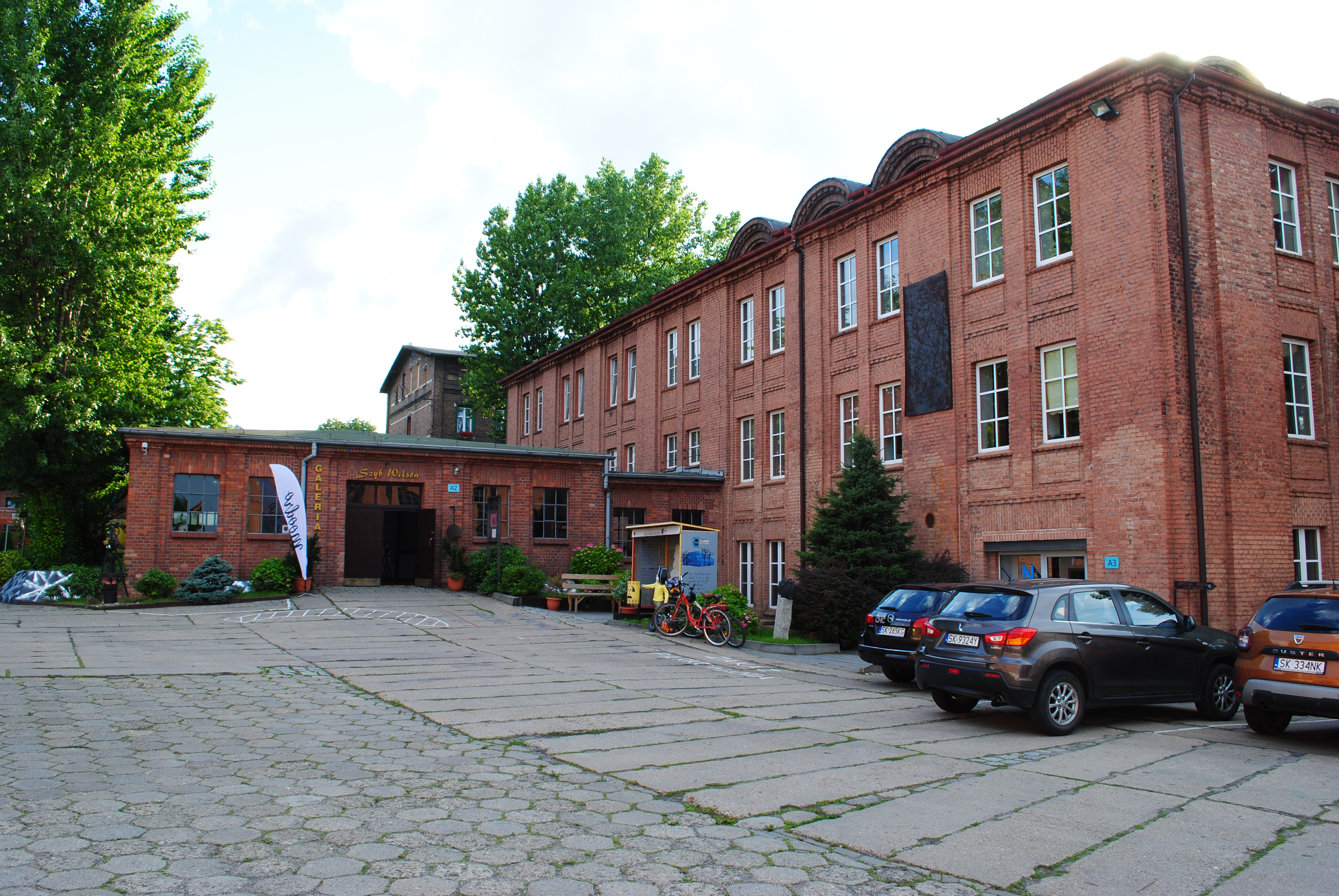
Szyb Wilson Gallery from the north-eastern side

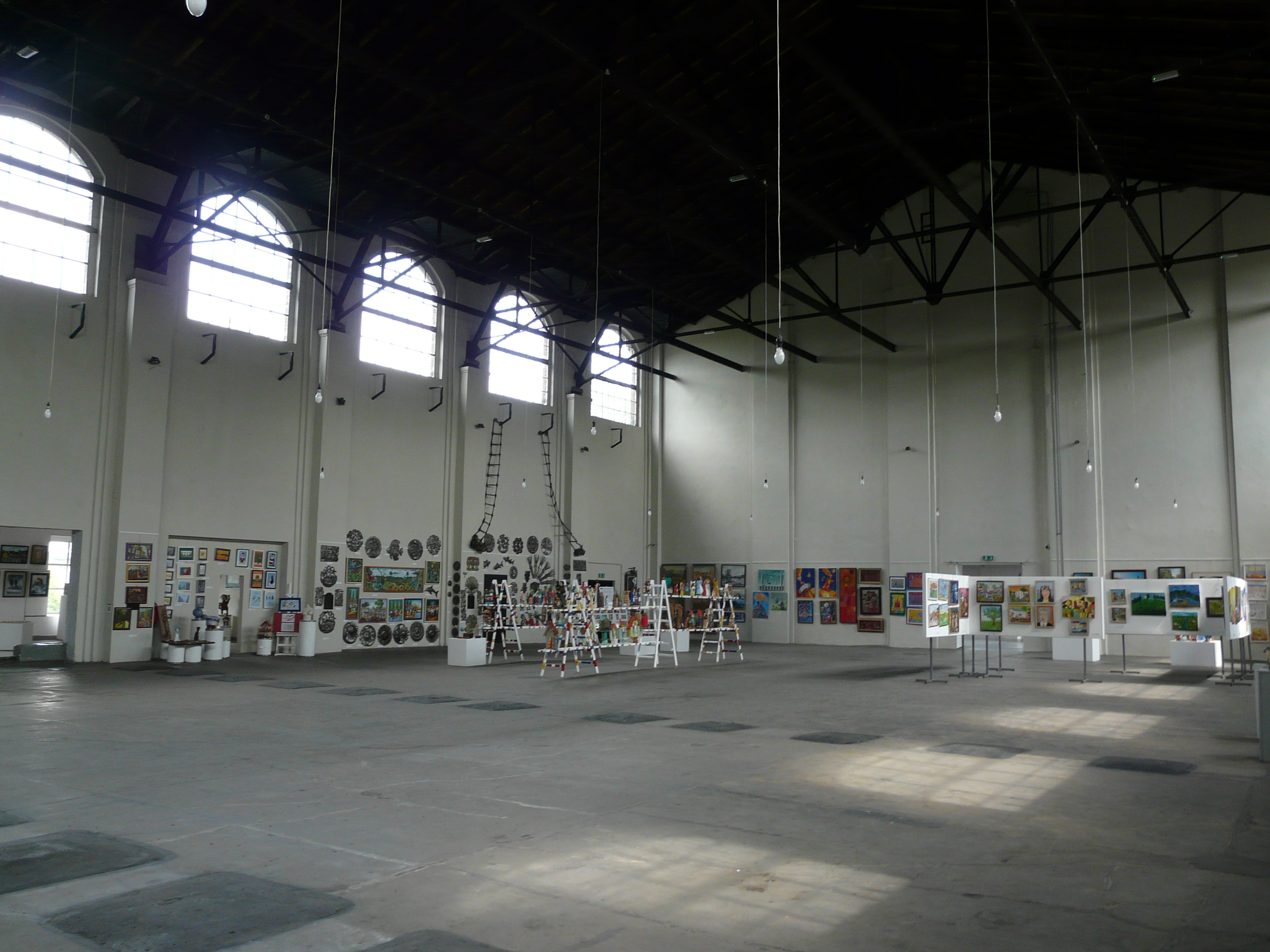
8th Art Naif Festival (2015)

- 6th International Festival of Naïve Art Art Naif Festival – 14 June – 14 August 2013
- CRASH – exhibition of the group Niezwyczajni – 5 April – 31 May 2013
- Andrzej Cisowski – Four Seasons – 2–29 March 2013
- Kontra – photography exhibition by Ewelina Neska – 2–28 February 2013
- Behind the Façade of Folklore – 7 January – 27 February 2013
- Inopoleku, or the Africanization of Silesia – painting exhibition by Albert Reck – 18 December 2012 – 28 February 2013
- Comrades – pinhole photography exhibition by Kamil Myszkowski – 22 November 2012 – 7 January 2013
- FOTO-SZOPY, or Szopienice Without Retouch – 19 October – 14 November 2012
- 66 Paintings / 66 Years of the Janów Group – 7 September – 4 November 2012
- 5th International Festival of Naïve Art – Art Naif Festival – 15 June – 17 August 2012
- Treatise on Mannequins – 30 March – 30 April 2012
- Karol Wieczorek and Friends – 9 March – 10 June 2012
- Painting – Anna Maria Rusinek – 20 January – 29 February 2012
- 50° 15′ | 18° 59′ Katowice – 27 graduates of the painting class of Prof. Markus Lüpertz – 11 October – 30 November 2011
- 4th International Festival of Naïve Art – Art Naif Festival – 17 June – 19 August 2011
- But It Has Already Happened… – Democratic Design Exhibition – 26 March – 5 May 2011
- Levon Fljyan – From Known to Unknown – 22 February – 1 March 2011
- Discipline of Record. Painting – exhibition of Sławomir Lewczuk – 21 January – 20 March 2011
- 3rd International Festival of Naïve Art – Art Naif Festival – 25 June – 31 August 2010
- Czech Art – New Humanism – 7 May – 14 June 2010
- Meeting with the Photography of the Niespork Family – 6 November 2009 – 1 January 2010
- Throw. Map. Stain. – exhibition of works by Marian Solisz – 9 October 2009 – 1 January 2010
- Lech Kołodziejczyk – metaphysical paintings – 31 August – 6 September 2009
- 2nd International Festival of Naïve Art NIKISZ-FOR – 26 June – 10 August 2009
- New Expression. 20 Years. Vol. 2 – Zbigniew Maciej Dowgiałło, Anna Gruszczyńska, Marek Kamieński, Wojciech Tracewski, Andrzej Cisowski – 26 February – 30 April 2009
- Contemporary Art of Lithuania – From the Beginning – group exhibition of 33 leading Lithuanian artists – 9 October – 30 November 2008
- 1st International Festival of Naïve Art NIKISZ-FOR – 24 June – 31 July 2008
- Triennial of Textile in Silesia
- Sculpture – Sylwester Ambroziak – 29 March – 30 April 2007
- First edition of the Nowa Muzyka Festival – 17 June 2006
- New Leipzig School – Neo Rauch, Martin Eder, Matthias Weischer, Tilo Baumgärtel, Christoph Ruckhäberle, David Schnell, Tim Eitel
- Freedom–Equality–Art – Przemysław Kwiek, Jiří Surůvka, Peter Lysáček, Lenka Klodová, Artur Żmijewski, Hubert Czerepok, Aleksander Ryszka, Jerzy Truszkowski, Dariusz Fodczuk, Pavel Šmejkal
- Epiphanies of Nature in the Late-Modern World – exhibition of sculptures and objects by Jan de Weryha-Wysoczański

== See also ==
- Silesian Industrial Monuments Route
