= Mierzanowo =

- Village
- Location within Poland
- Coordinates: 53°01′35″N 20°33′51″E
- Country: Poland
- Voivodeship: Masovian Voivodeship
- County: Ciechanów
- Gmina: Grudusk

Mierzanowo [mjɛʐaˈnɔvɔ] is a village in the administrative district of Gmina Grudusk, within Ciechanów County, Masovian Voivodeship, in east-central Poland.

== Notable people ==
- Ignacy Mościcki (1867–1946), President of Poland
