= Museum of Metallurgy in Chorzów =

Metallurgy museum in Chorzów, Poland

- Muzeum Hutnictwa w Chorzowie
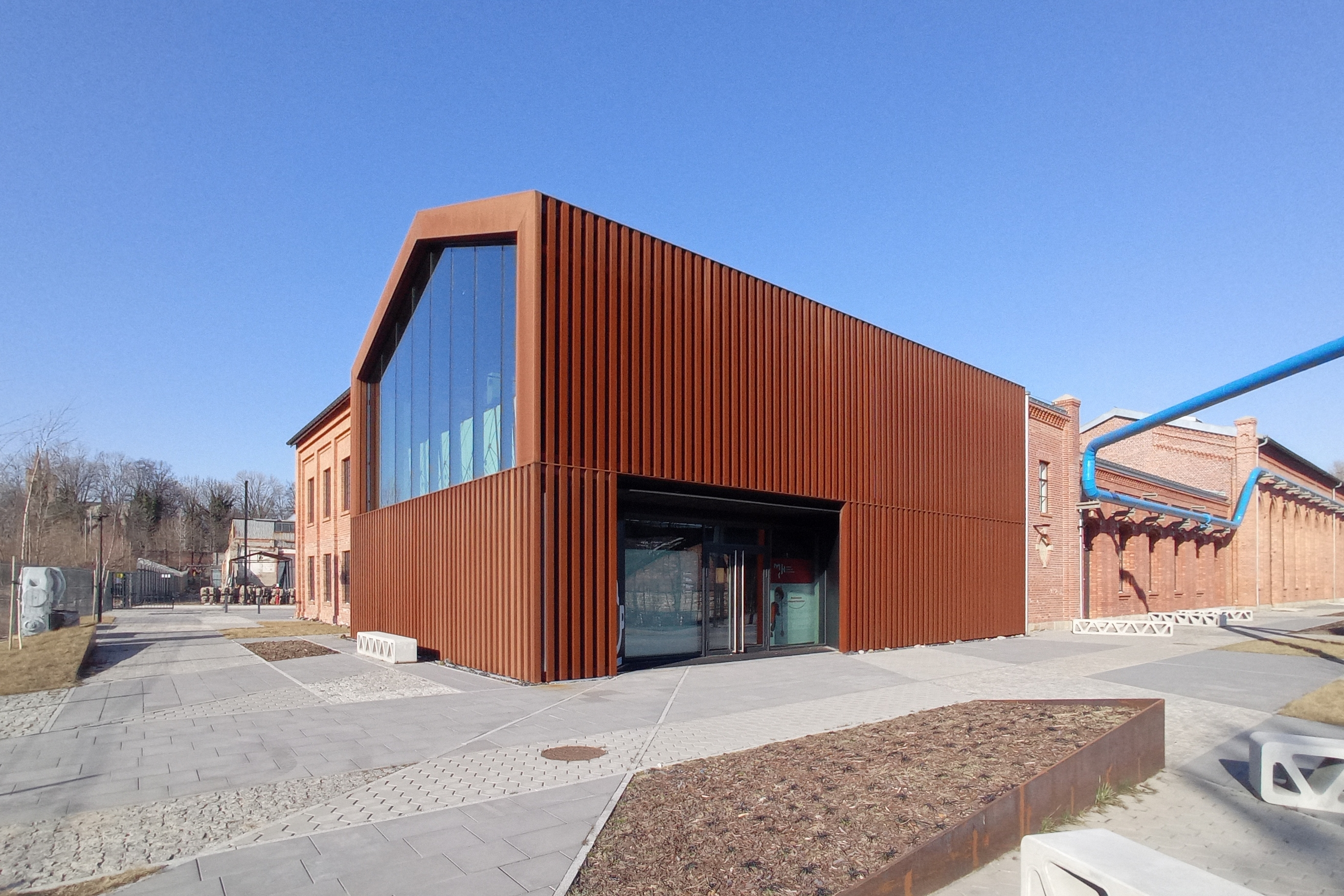
- The museum building (2022)
- Established: 2019
- Location: ul. Metalowców 4a, Chorzów, Silesian Voivodeship, Poland
- Coordinates: 50°18′14.2″N 18°57′29.1″E
- Director: Tomasz Owoc
- Owner: City of Chorzów
- Website: muzeumhutnictwa.pl/en/

The Museum of Metallurgy in Chorzów (Muzeum Hutnictwa w Chorzowie) is a municipal museum in Chorzów, Poland, devoted to the material and intangible heritage of iron and steelmaking in the region. It is housed in the former power-plant building of the Royal Ironworks (Huta Królewska). Since 2023 the museum has been part of the Silesian Industrial Monuments Route (Szlak Zabytków Techniki).

== History ==
The oldest part of the building dates to 1895 and originally served as the power plant of the Royal Ironworks; between 1898 and 1911 it supplied electricity to the town then known as Königshütte (now Chorzów). In 2010 the City of Chorzów purchased the historic hall from Bank Handlowy in Warsaw and began plans to adapt it for a metallurgy museum.

The museum was formally established by a resolution of the Chorzów City Council in 2019, and Adam Kowalski was appointed director later that year. The redevelopment and preparation of the permanent exhibition were supported by European Union funding through a wider revitalisation project led by the Coal Mining Museum in Zabrze (Muzeum Górnictwa Węglowego w Zabrzu).

The museum was inaugurated on 26 November 2021 and opened to the public on 27 November 2021.

Under the 2022 statute, the institution was formed through the merger (effective 1 January 2022) of the previous Museum in Chorzów and the then “in-organisation” Metallurgy Museum into a single cultural institution named Muzeum Hutnictwa w Chorzowie.

In April 2025 Tomasz Owoc became director of the museum.

== Collections and activities ==
According to its statute, the museum collects, conserves and presents cultural heritage in the fields of technology, history, ethnology, archaeology, art and artistic craft, with particular emphasis on metallurgy, the Upper Silesian Industrial Region and Chorzów. It also includes a City and Region History Department (Oddział Historii Miasta i Regionu).

In 2020 the museum initiated the oral-history project Mów mi huto (“Tell me, steelworks”), recording interviews with former steelworkers for use in the permanent exhibition and as an archive of memories.

== Permanent exhibition ==
The core exhibition, The Kingdom of Iron (Królestwo żelaza), presents the history of the Royal and Batory steelworks and is structured around historical machinery as well as recorded testimonies from former workers.

== Gallery ==
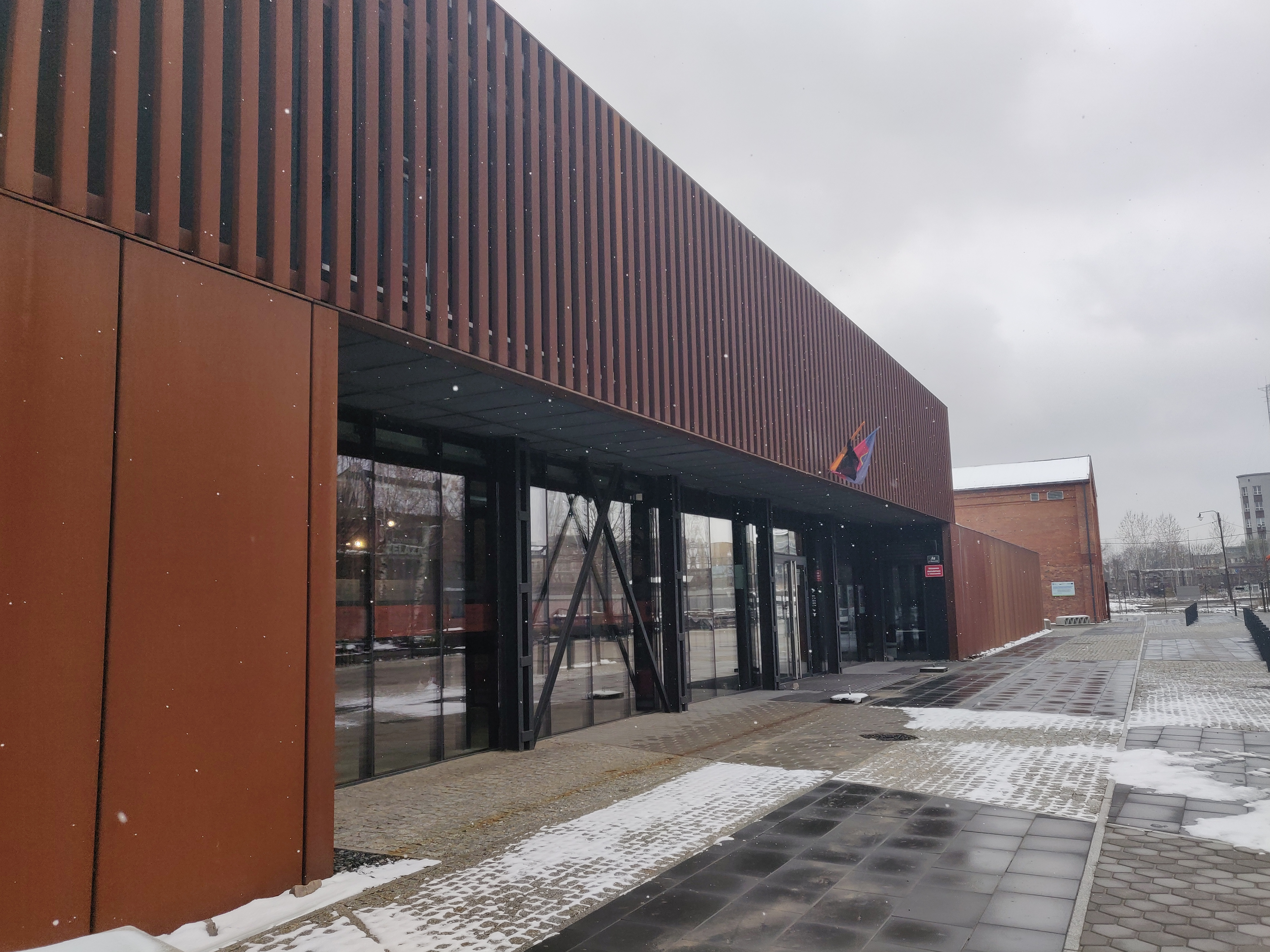
Entrance (2022)

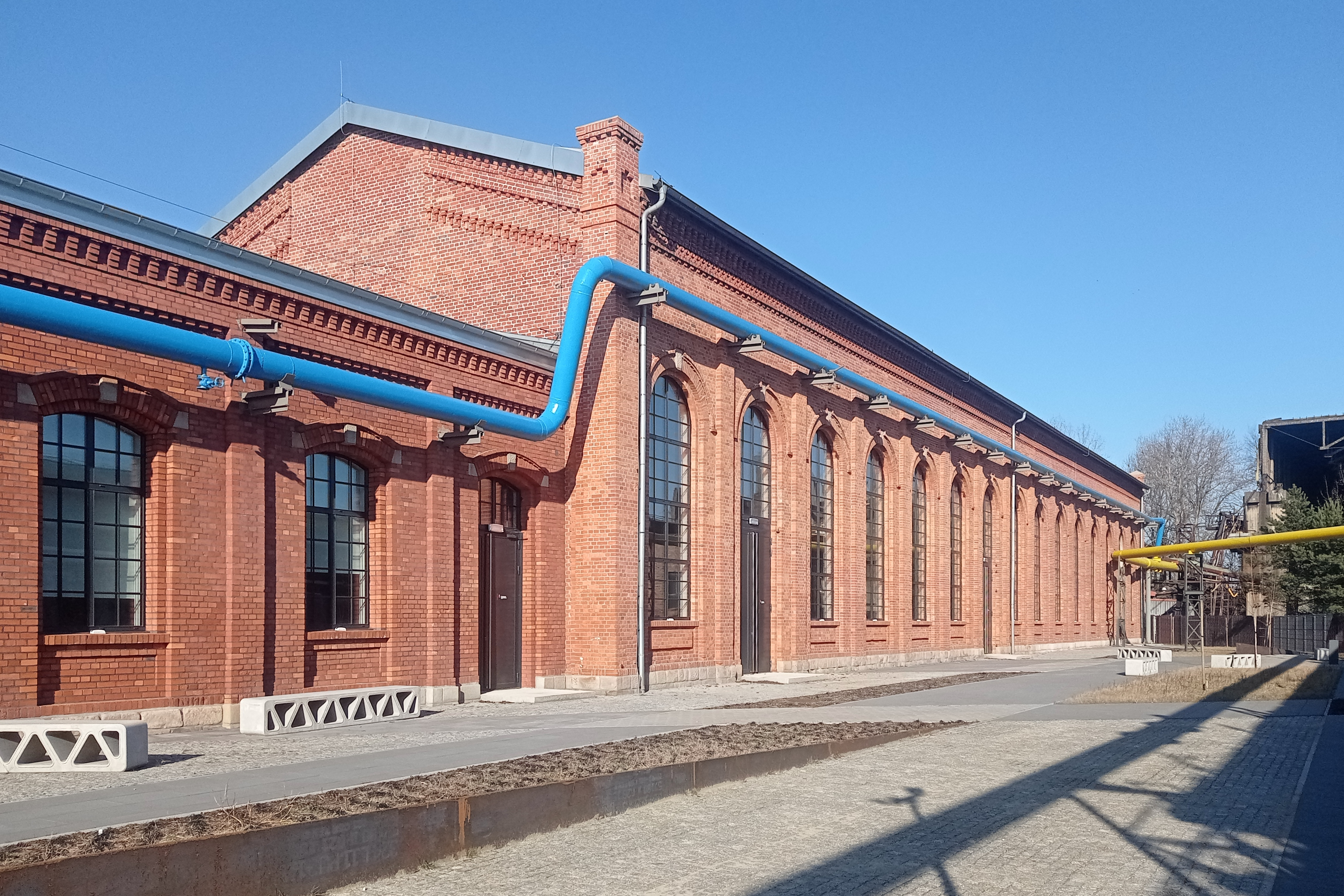
Power plant hall (2022)

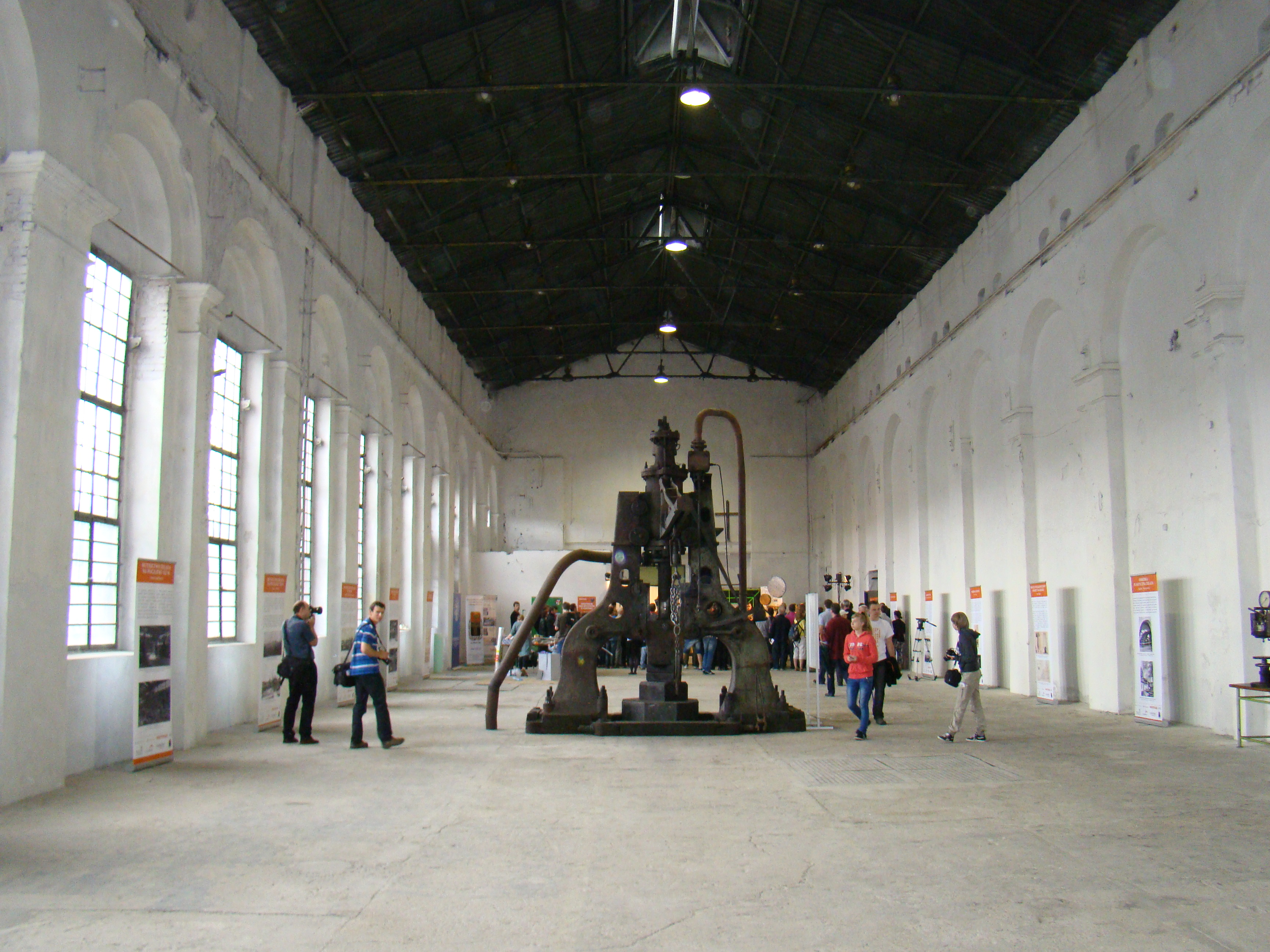
Interior before adaptation (2014)

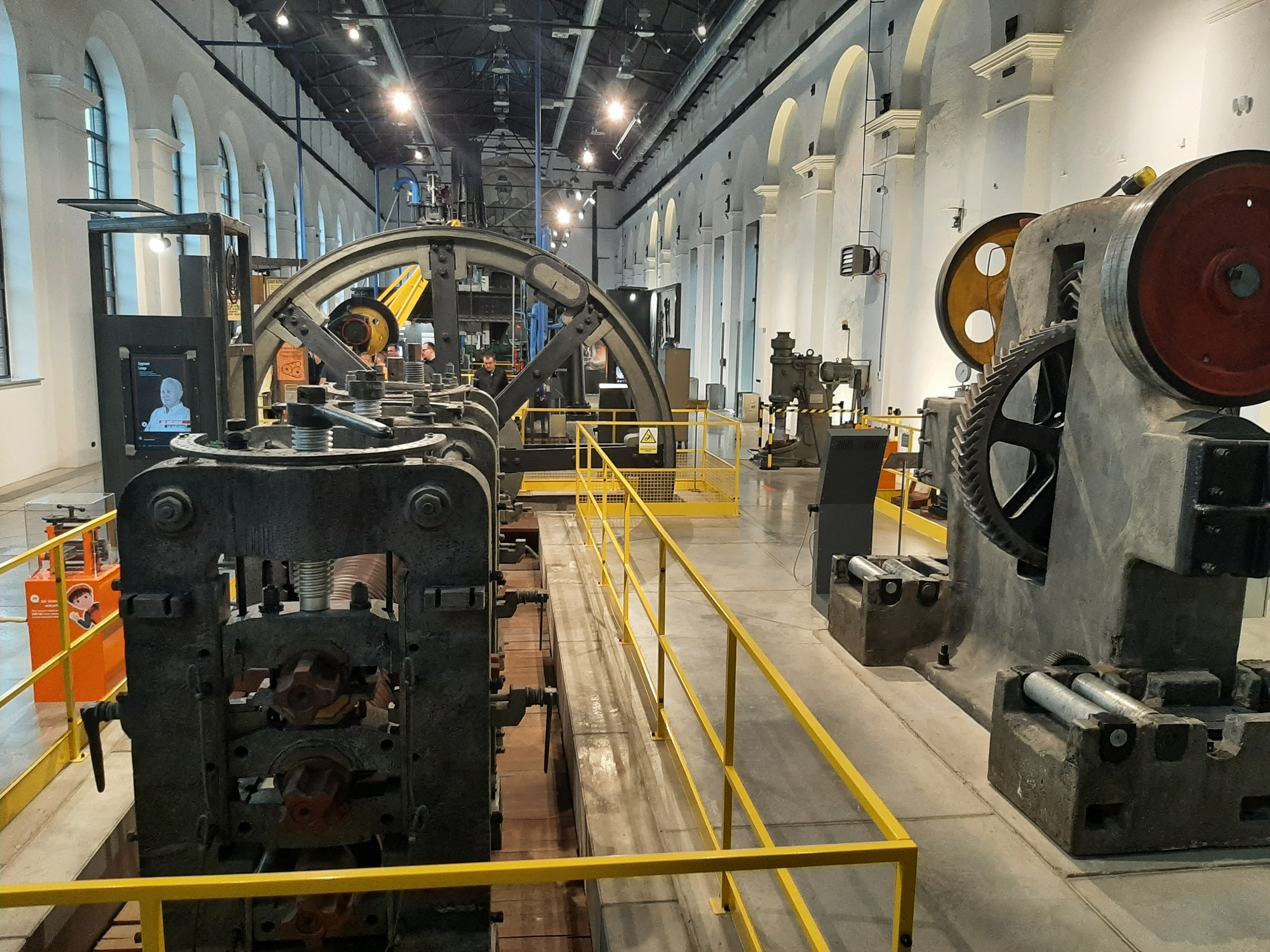
Exhibition hall (2022)

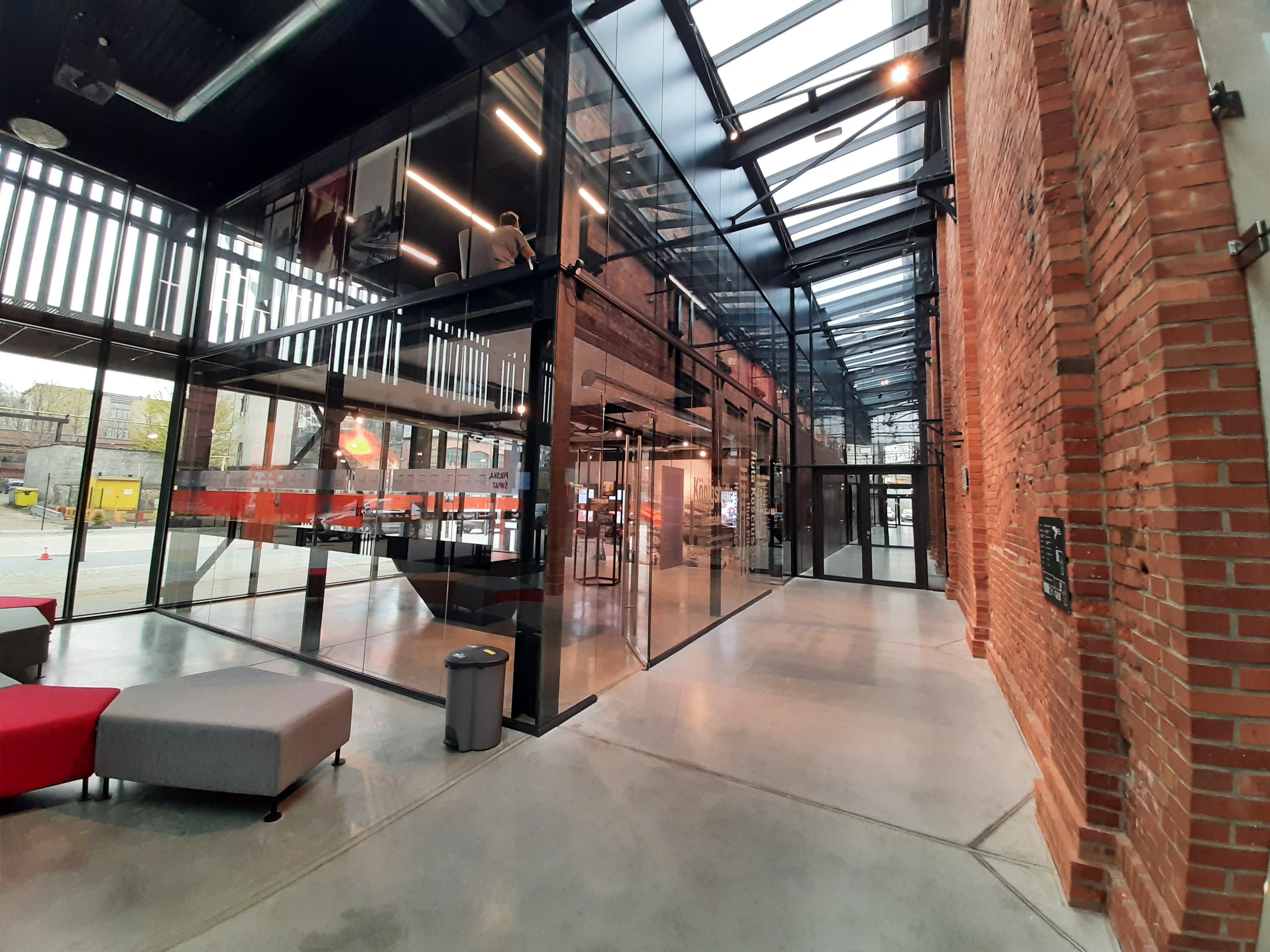
Lobby (2022)

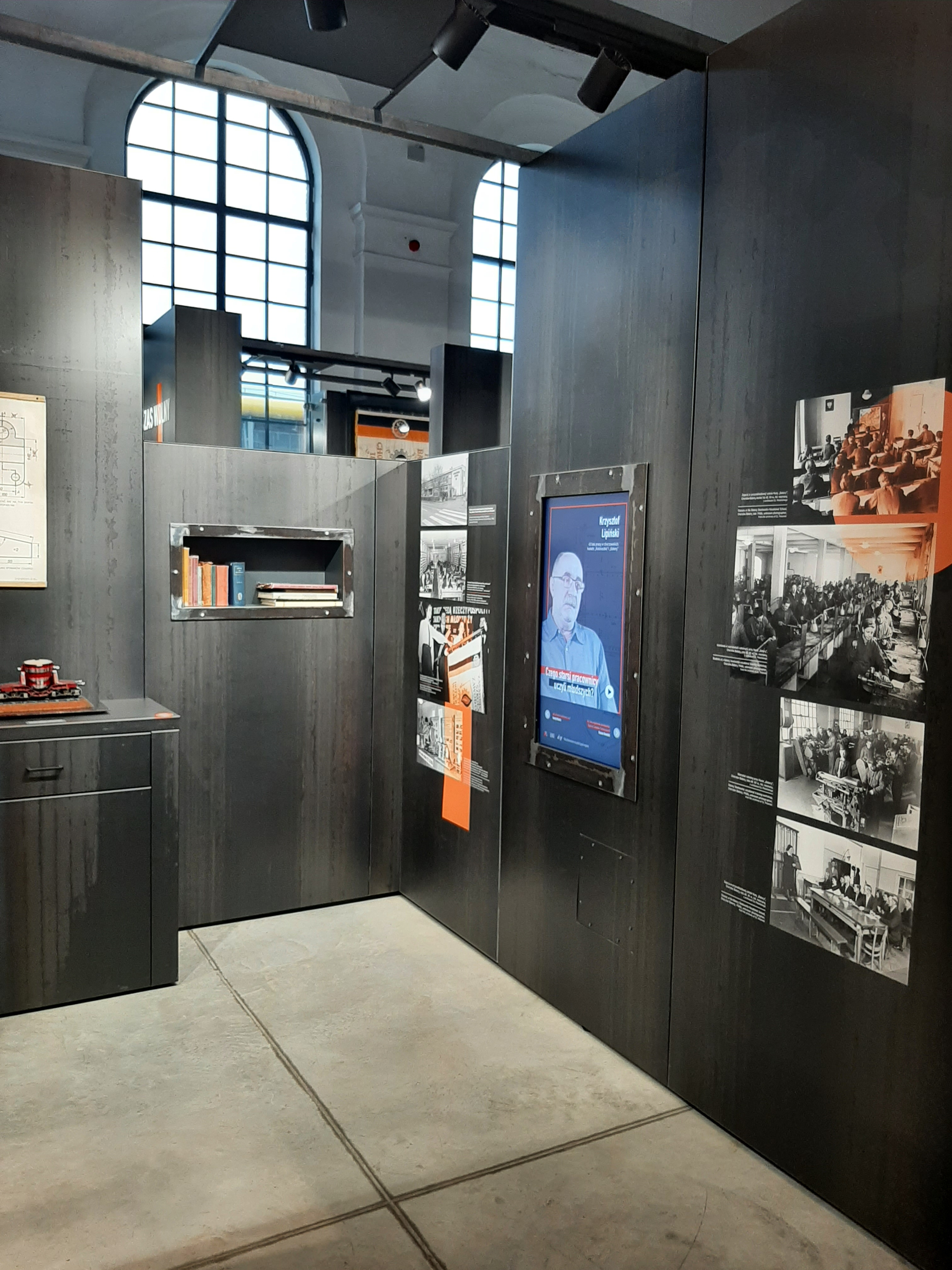
Exhibition (2022)

== See also ==
- European Route of Industrial Heritage
- Silesian Industrial Monuments Route
