= Silesian Industrial Monuments Route =

Automobile industrial heritage trail in the Silesian Voivodeship, Poland

Industrial Monuments Route of the Silesian Voivodeship
- Length: Approx. 470 km (290 mi)
- Location: Silesian Voivodeship, Poland
- Established: 21 June 2005 (by resolution of the Silesian Voivodeship Board)
- Trailheads: Częstochowa – Żywiec
- Use: Automobile tourism; cultural tourism
- Maintained by: Coal Mining Museum in Zabrze (operator; the Silesian Voivodeship is the route administrator)
- Website: www.zabytkitechniki.pl

Silesian Industrial Monuments Route or precisely The Industrial Monuments Route of the Silesian Voivodeship (Szlak Zabytków Techniki Województwa Śląskiego, often shortened to Szlak Zabytków Techniki or SZT) is a themed, automobile tourist and cultural route in the Silesian Voivodeship in southern Poland, linking sites associated with the region's industrial heritage.

The route currently comprises 42 sites connected with industries such as mining, metallurgy, power generation, rail transport, communications, textiles, water production and the food industry; it includes museums, inhabited workers' settlements and operating industrial facilities owned by a mix of local governments and private and public entities.

== History and administration ==
The route was established by a resolution of the Silesian Voivodeship Board on 21 June 2005; its official opening took place on 19 October 2006 (in the then Tychy Brewing Museum).

According to the route's management regulations, the administrator is the Silesian Voivodeship, while day-to-day operation has been carried out by the Coal Mining Museum in Zabrze since 2020 (as the route operator).

== Industriada ==
The route is associated with Industriada, an annual festival devoted to industrial heritage and organised across participating sites.

== Route ==
The Industrial Monuments Route includes 42 sites (as of 1 January 2023), as listed by the route operator.

No.	Image	Site	Town/city	Description
1		Stara Fabryka (Old Factory)	Bielsko-Biała	Former Büttner cloth factory; the preserved halls house exhibitions on textile-industry machinery and processes.
2		Upper Silesian Narrow Gauge Railways (Górnośląskie Koleje Wąskotorowe)	Bytom	Narrow-gauge railways historically served major industrial plants in Upper Silesia; the preserved tourist route is 21 km long and runs from Bytom via Tarnowskie Góry to Miasteczko Śląskie.
3		Museum of Metallurgy in Chorzów (Muzeum Hutnictwa w Chorzowie)	Chorzów	Opened in 2021, the museum presents the history of iron and steel metallurgy in the region, including the former Kościuszko/Królewska and Batory/Bismarck works.
4		Prezydent Shaft (Szyb Prezydent)	Chorzów	The winding tower is 42 m tall; the rope sheaves are 5.5 m in diameter. The site includes the “Sztygarka” complex (former foremen’s housing adapted for hospitality and events).
5		Printing Museum in Cieszyn (Muzeum Drukarstwa)	Cieszyn	A functioning typographic print shop with working type, matrices, bookbinding and casting equipment available for demonstration.
6		Castle Brewery in Cieszyn (Browar Zamkowy)	Cieszyn	A brewery combining historical brewing heritage with contemporary production methods, presented in a museum format.
7		Elektrownia Contemporary Art Gallery (Galeria Sztuki Współczesnej Elektrownia)	Czeladź	Contemporary art gallery located in the former power plant of the Saturn coal mine; the building is associated with Józef Pius Dziekoński and retains large-scale industrial equipment (including motor–generator sets, an ~8-ton overhead crane, and a generator nicknamed “Wanda”).
8		Familoki housing estate in Czerwionka (Familoki w Czerwionce)	Czerwionka-Leszczyny	Workers’ housing estate built for the Dębieńsko mine (1899–1916), preserving the settlement layout and associated infrastructure.
9		Museum of Iron Ore Mining (Muzeum Górnictwa Rud Żelaza)	Częstochowa	Museum documenting the regional history of iron ore mining, with extensive exhibits including original machinery and equipment.
10		Museum of Railway History (Muzeum Historii Kolei)	Częstochowa	Located in the Częstochowa Stradom station building; the collection includes railway-related exhibits and a traction-vehicle simulator for visitors.
11		Match Production Museum (Muzeum Produkcji Zapałek)	Częstochowa	An operating match-factory museum where visitors can follow the production cycle from wood preparation to packaging, with preserved machinery on display.
12		Sztygarka Training Mine (Kopalnia Ćwiczebna Sztygarka)	Dąbrowa Górnicza	Underground tourist route (~800 m of workings), built in 1927 as a training mine for a vocational technical school; used to teach mining equipment, geology documentation, ventilation and underground surveying.
13		Sanitary Engineering Museum (Muzeum Techniki Sanitarnej)	Gliwice	Located in a 1911 sewage pumping station; presents the history of the city’s sewerage system and water–wastewater infrastructure and hygiene-related technology.
14		Artistic Casting Department (Oddział Odlewnictwa Artystycznego)	Gliwice	Museum branch presenting products of the Royal Cast Iron Foundry; housed in buildings of the former “Gliwice” mine (1912–1914) designed by Georg and Emil Zillmann.
15		Gliwice Radio Station	Gliwice	Museum branch comprising the radio station complex and the wooden antenna mast (1935), with exhibitions of original radio-technology equipment.
16		Historic Waterworks Station Zawada (Stacja Wodociągowa Zawada)	Karchowice	Waterworks station established in the late 19th century; exhibitions are located in historic buildings and include original machinery and equipment.
17		Szyb Wilson Gallery (Galeria Szyb Wilson)	Katowice	Adapted from the former miners’ assembly hall and baths of the Giesche mine (1918; Georg and Emil Zillmann); operates as an art gallery and hosts the Art Naif Festival.
18		Giszowiec workers’ estate	Katowice	Workers’ settlement designed as a garden-city style estate by Georg and Emil Zillmann and preserved from demolition.
19		Nikiszowiec workers’ estate	Katowice	Workers’ settlement built for the Giesche mine (1908–1919), designed by Georg and Emil Zillmann.
20		Silesian Museum (Muzeum Śląskie)	Katowice	Museum complex located on the grounds of the former “Katowice” coal mine, with preserved mine-related buildings and structures integrated into the site.
21		Zinc Metallurgy Museum – Rolling Mill (Muzeum Hutnictwa Cynku – Walcownia)	Katowice	Preserved technological line for producing and rolling zinc sheet, including furnaces, rolling equipment and shears; the hall is approximately 91 m × 20 m × 5 m.
22		Porcelain Factory (Fabryka Porcelany)	Katowice	Porcelain factory established in 1923 in Bogucice; associated with the “Giesche” Porcelain Factory joint-stock company (per the route operator).
23		Museum of Power Engineering (Muzeum Energetyki)	Łaziska Górne	Located in a former 60 kV switchgear building (1928); exhibits include power-industry devices, meters, documents and photographs; the collection also includes protective equipment used for high-voltage work.
24		Central Firefighting Museum (Centralne Muzeum Pożarnictwa)	Mysłowice	Museum collection of firefighting heritage, reported by the route operator as exceeding 4,000 items.
25		Museum of the Silesian Press (Muzeum Prasy Śląskiej)	Pszczyna	Founded in 1985 by the Towarzystwo Miłośników Ziemi Pszczyńskiej; exhibits relate to printing and the history of the Silesian press.
26		Bread, School and Curiosities Museum (Muzeum Chleba, Szkoły i Ciekawostek)	Radzionków	Collection includes machines, vessels, photographs and ephemera related to breadmaking; includes “bread money” (tokens/vouchers) and hands-on baking demonstrations for visitors.
27		Ficinus Workers’ Colony (Kolonia robotnicza Ficinus)	Ruda Śląska	Workers’ housing estate built in 1860–1867 for the “Błogosławieństwo Boże” mine; revitalisation works began in 1995.
28		Stacja Biblioteka	Ruda Śląska	Public library housed in the historic former railway station building in the Chebzie district; comprehensive revitalisation was completed in 2018.
29		Historic Narrow Gauge Railway Station in Rudy (Zabytkowa Stacja Kolejki Wąskotorowej)	Rudy	Tourist narrow-gauge railway site near the Cysterskie Kompozycje Rud Wielkich Landscape Park; offers scenic routes and preserved rolling stock and buildings.
30		Historic “Ignacy” Mine (Zabytkowa Kopalnia Ignacy)	Rybnik	Former “Hoym” mine (opened 1792); features a preserved 1900 steam winding engine in the “Głowacki” shaft engine house and serves as a cultural venue.
31		Park Tradycji (Tradition Park)	Siemianowice Śląskie	Post-industrial site adapted into a cultural institution, centred on the former “Michał” mine shaft and engine house; includes a 1905 steam winding engine and exhibitions (including miners’ lamps).
32		Headframes of KWK Polska (Wieże KWK Polska)	Świętochłowice	Two headframes—one tower-type and one A-frame—are remnants of the former “Deutschland” mine (renamed “Polska” in 1937), whose origins date to 1870–1873.
33		Black Trout Adit (Sztolnia Czarnego Pstrąga)	Tarnowskie Góry	Located in Repecki Park; regarded as the oldest adit in Poland, with a 600 m underground boat section between the Ewa and Sylwester shafts.
34		Historic Silver Mine (Zabytkowa Kopalnia Srebra)	Tarnowskie Góry	A labyrinth of underground corridors remaining from the former royal “Fryderyk” ore mine; the tourist route is 1,740 m long and links three historic shafts: Anioł, Żmija and Szczęść Boże.
35		Museum of Tychy Prince's Breweries (Muzeum Tyskich Browarów Książęcych)	Tychy	Visitor centre offering exhibitions and multimedia presentations, with tours of both the contemporary production line and a historic brewing line with preserved technical infrastructure elements.
36		Browar Obywatelski	Tychy	Founded in 1898; an educational trail within the 19th-century brewery complex introduces the site’s history and the functions of individual buildings.
37		Ustroń Museum (Muzeum Ustrońskie)	Ustroń	Located in a former building of the “Klemens” ironworks (operating 1772–1897); presents historic exhibits related to metallurgy and forging, and includes an industrial and agricultural open-air section.
38		Queen Louise Adit (Sztolnia Królowa Luiza)	Zabrze	A museum complex with above-ground and underground sections (the former “Królowa Luiza” mine and the Main Key Hereditary Adit). The site also offers an underground boat route (the Water Route).
39		Maciej Shaft (Szyb Maciej)	Zabrze	A complex of structures of the former “Concordia” mine (later “Pstrowski”) in Zabrze-Maciejów; the shaft was converted into a deep well and the buildings have been repurposed for social, cultural and economic functions. The 1920s shaft complex retains the headframe, headgear building, engine house and water station.
40		Guido Mine (Kopalnia Guido)	Zabrze	Visitor routes on the 170 m and 320 m levels (with an additional 355 sub-level); features include a 1927 electric hoisting machine, a mining cage descent, historic workings, underground stables, the St Barbara chapel (170 m), working mining machinery, a suspended electric railway and an underground pub at 320 m.
41		Old Mill – Museum of Old Crafts (Stary Młyn – Muzeum Dawnych Rzemiosł)	Żarki	Located in a historic electric mill; the ground floor presents original mill equipment, while the upper floor features (incl. multimedia) exhibits on traditional local crafts such as shoemaking, coopering and wheelwrighting.
42		Żywiec Brewery Museum (Muzeum Browaru Żywiec)	Żywiec	Located in the buildings of the Archducal Brewery (1856); presents devices and exhibits related to beer production and brewery history. The museum comprises 18 rooms (approx. 1,600 m²) and uses multimedia elements.
