= "Elektrownia" Gallery of Contemporary Art =

Contemporary art gallery in Czeladź, Poland

- Galeria Sztuki Współczesnej "Elektrownia"
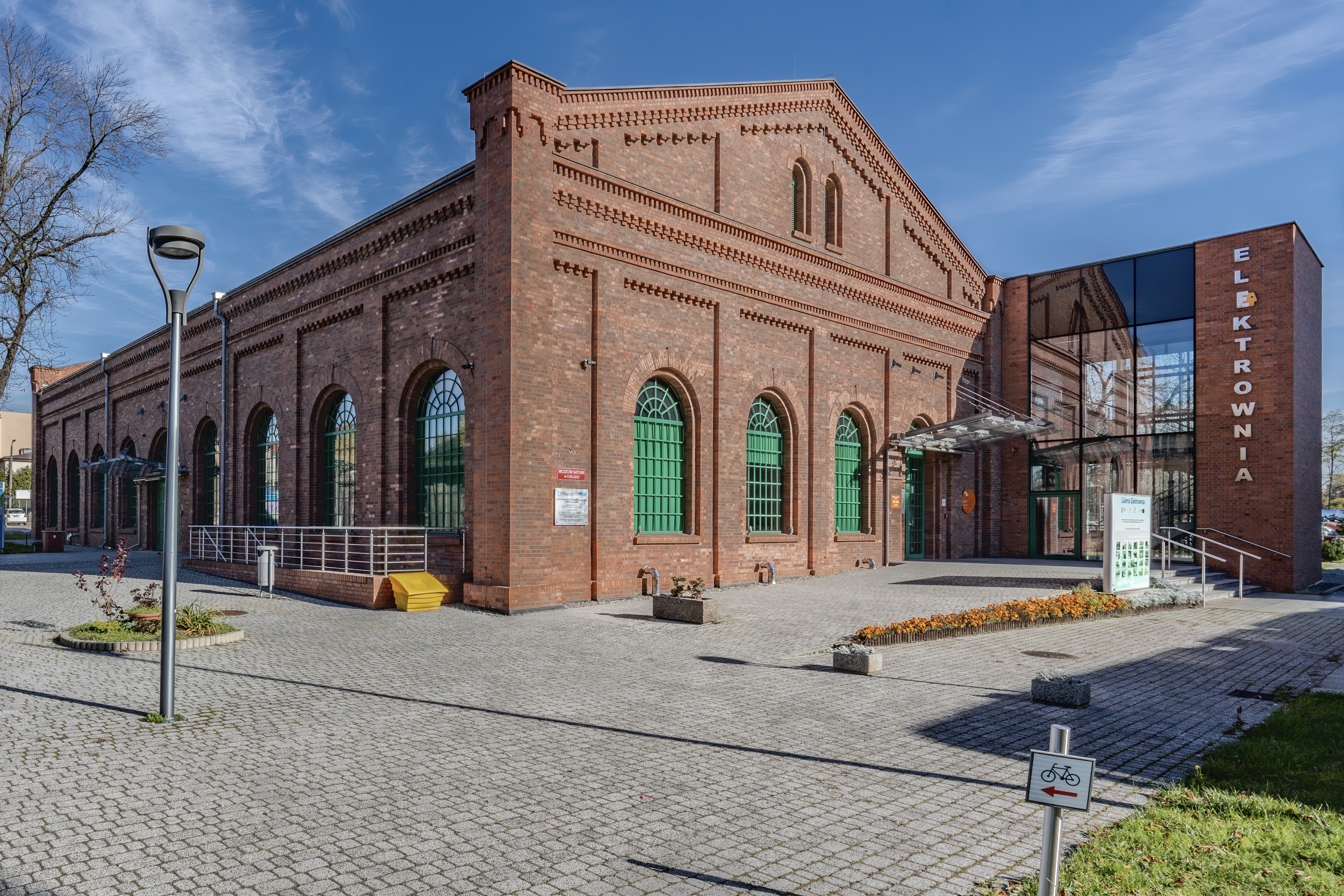
- The gallery building (former Saturn coal mine power station), 2022
- Established: 2005
- Location: ul. Dehnelów 45, 41-250 Czeladź, Silesian Voivodeship, Poland
- Coordinates: 50°18′29.93″N 19°03′42.98″E
- Type: Contemporary art gallery
- Website: galeria-elektrownia.czeladz.pl

Galeria Sztuki Współczesnej "Elektrownia" (Polish: Gallery of Contemporary Art "Elektrownia"; lit. "Power Station") is a contemporary art gallery in Czeladź, Poland, located at ul. Dehnelów 45 in a post-industrial building of the former power station of the Saturn coal mine complex. The gallery began operating in 2005. In 2010 it was included in the Silesian Industrial Monuments Route (Szlak Zabytków Techniki Województwa Śląskiego). Since 1 September 2016, the site has been operated by the Muzeum Saturn (Saturn Museum) in Czeladź.

== History ==
The power station building was constructed in 1902–1908 to a design by Polish architect Józef Pius Dziekoński. After the Saturn coal mine ended production in 1996, the building was modernised and adapted for cultural use in a project completed in late 2013, largely funded with European Union support.

== Building and displays ==
The brick building has a rectangular plan with a central entrance axis and a prominent tower with Gothic-inspired detailing. Inside, original equipment from the former power station has been preserved, including the "Wanda" generator (manufactured in 1903), compressors, converters, an original control panel, and an 8-ton overhead crane.

== Program ==
The institution presents temporary exhibitions of contemporary art and hosts cultural events (including workshops and concerts). The site was used for the inauguration of the 2016 edition of Industriada (the annual festival associated with the Industrial Monuments Route).
