= Museum of Railway History in Częstochowa =

Railway museum in Częstochowa, Poland

Museum of Railway History
- Muzeum Historii Kolei w Częstochowie
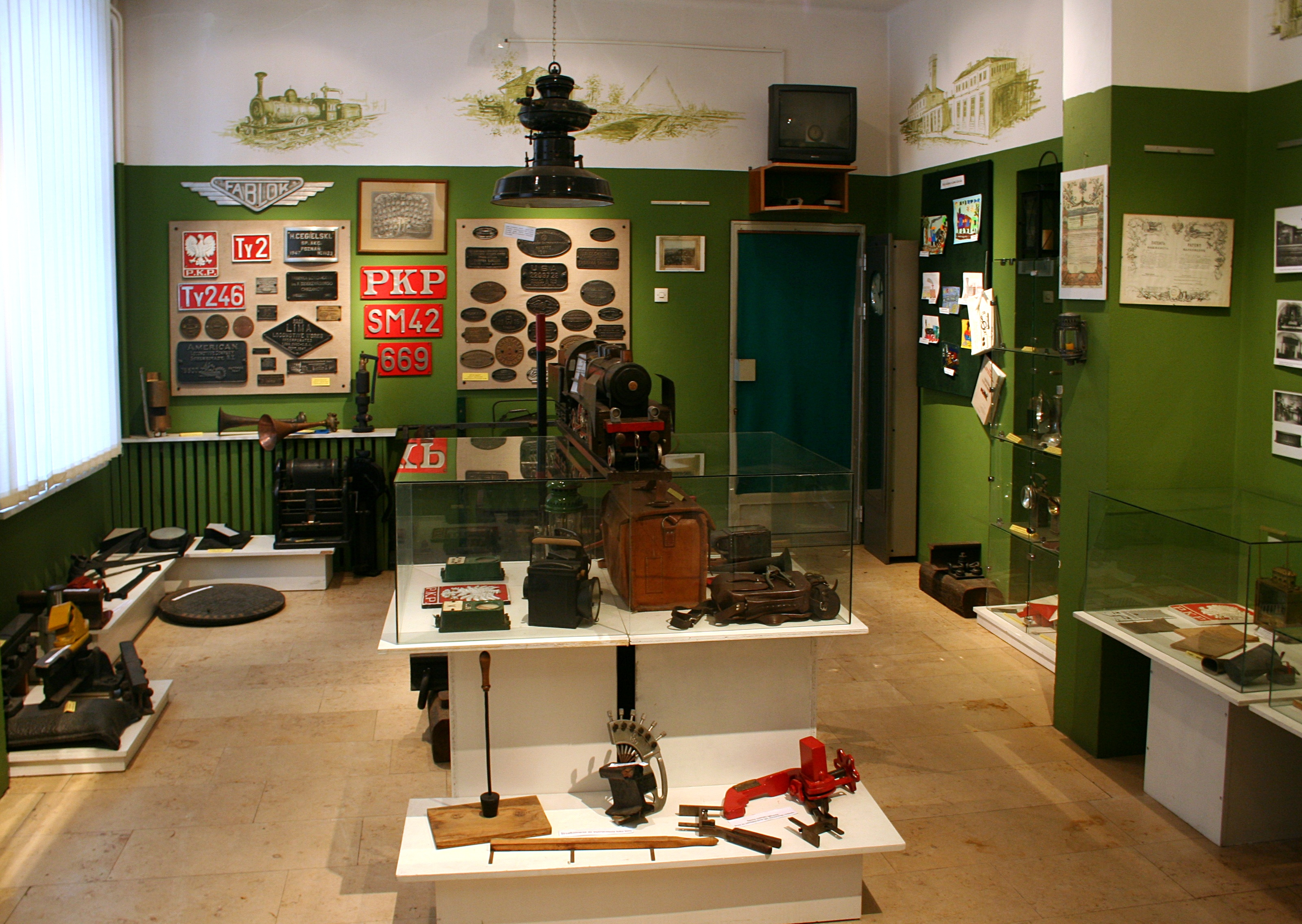
- Main exhibition on the first floor of the Częstochowa Stradom railway station building
- Established: 23 March 2001
- Location: First floor, Częstochowa Stradom railway station, Pułaskiego 100/120, 42-200 Częstochowa, Poland
- Coordinates: 50°47′51.3″N 19°06′26.4″E
- Type: Railway museum
- Website: tpkww.one.pl

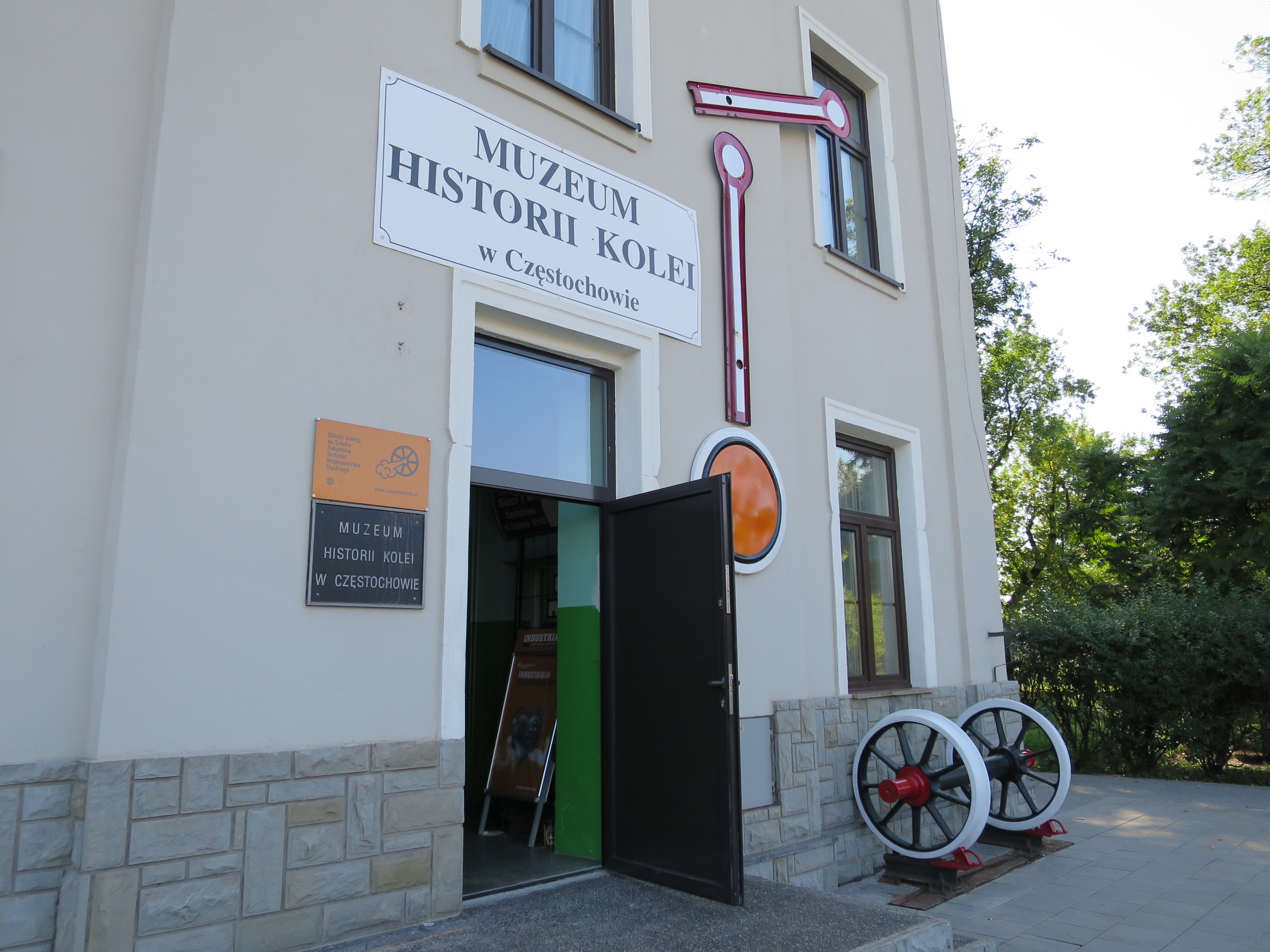
Entrance to the museum

The Museum of Railway History (Muzeum Historii Kolei w Częstochowie) is a railway museum in Częstochowa, Poland, located on the first floor of the Częstochowa Stradom railway station building. The museum was ceremonially opened on 23 March 2001.

== History and location ==
The museum operates in rooms on the first floor of the station building in the Stradom district of Częstochowa. It was organised in 2001 by the Towarzystwo Przyjaciół Kolei Warszawsko-Wiedeńskiej (Society of Friends of the Warsaw–Vienna Railway).

== Collection ==
The collection includes railway artefacts and equipment such as elements of locomotive and carriage fittings, railway lamps, uniforms and memorabilia of railway staff, medals and documents, tools and equipment used for infrastructure maintenance, station equipment, and items such as clocks and telephones. A notable exhibit is an electric-locomotive driving simulator. The museum also reconstructed a stationmaster's office (pomieszczenie zawiadowcy stacji).

== Preserved rolling stock ==
The museum oversees two historic steam locomotives displayed in Częstochowa: TKt48-151 at Częstochowa station and Ol49-20 near the locomotive depot.

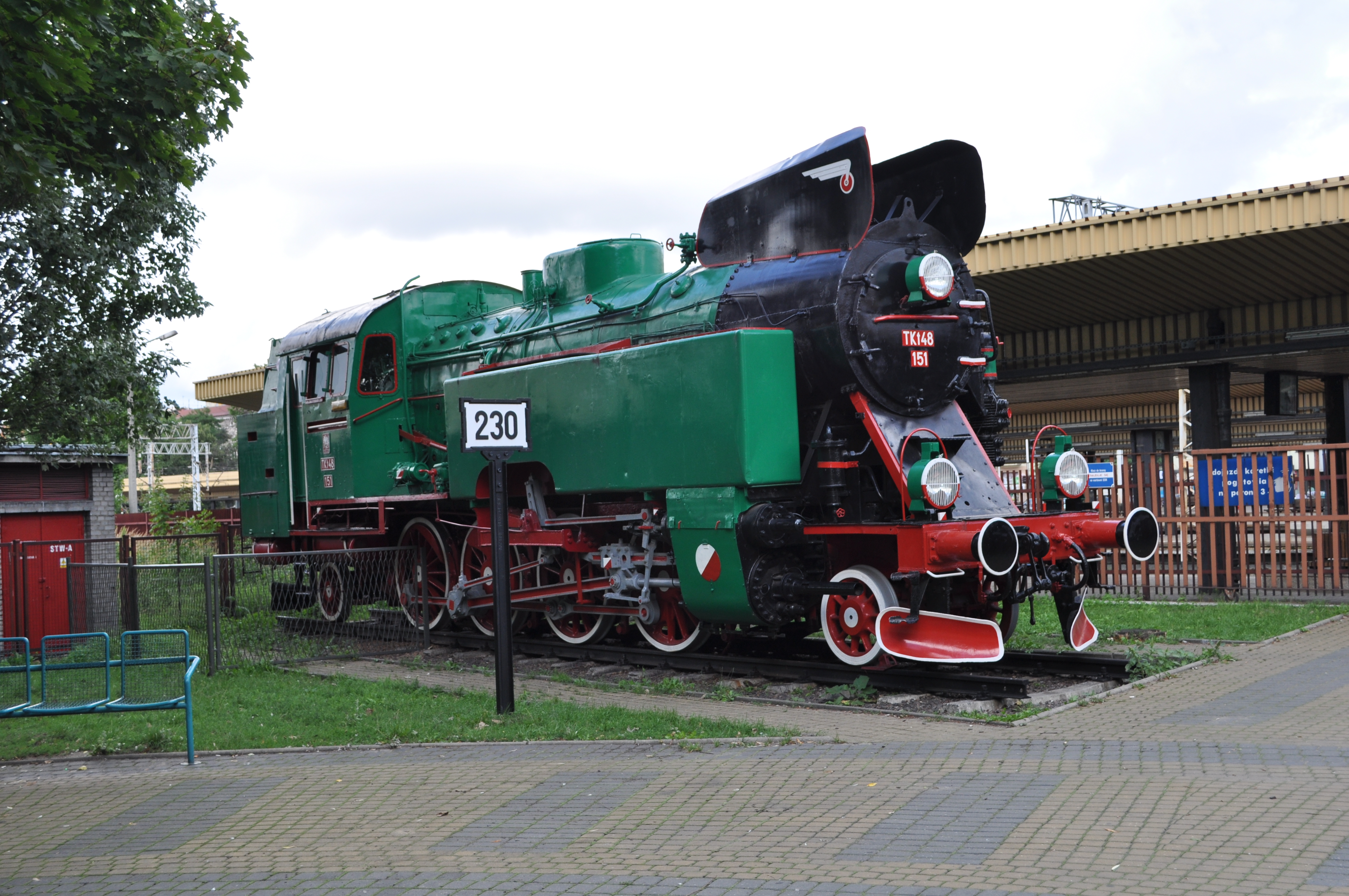
Steam locomotive TKt48-151 on display at Częstochowa station

== Silesian Industrial Monuments Route ==
Since 19 October 2006 the museum has been part of the Silesian Industrial Monuments Route (Szlak Zabytków Techniki Województwa Śląskiego).

== Visitor information ==
According to the museum's website, admission is free; the museum is typically open on Wednesdays and Saturdays (10:00–13:00), with visits at other times available by prior arrangement.

== See also ==
- Silesian Industrial Monuments Route
- Częstochowa Stradom railway station
- Warsaw–Vienna railway
