= Związek Pracy Obywatelskiej Kobiet =

- Związek Pracy Obywatelskiej Kobiet
- Formation: 1928
- Purpose: Support women's rights
- Official language: Polish

Związek Pracy Obywatelskiej Kobiet (ZPOK) was a Polish women's organisation. It was founded in 1928 by Józef Piłsudski to encourage women's greater participation in public life.
