= Artur Żmijewski =

Artur Żmijewski may refer to:

- Artur Żmijewski (actor) (born 1966), Polish actor
- Artur Żmijewski (filmmaker) (born 1966), Polish movie maker, visual artist, photographer
