= Ignacy Mościcki =

President of Poland from 1926 to 1939

His Excellency Ignacy Mościcki OOB OPR
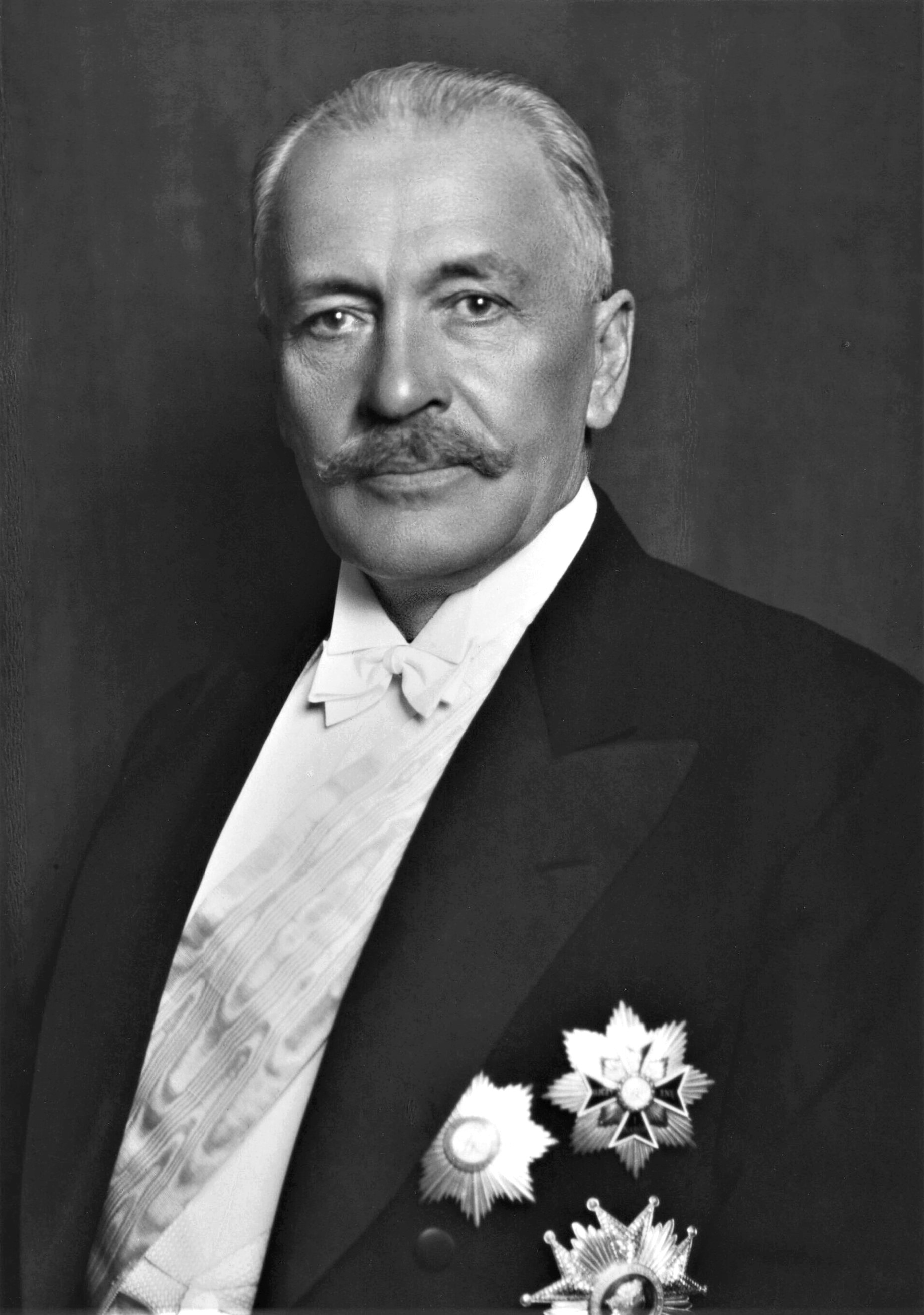

President of Poland
- In office 4 June 1926 – 30 September 1939
- Prime Minister: Kazimierz Bartel Show more: Józef Piłsudski; Kazimierz Bartel; Kazimierz Świtalski; Walery Sławek; Aleksander Prystor; Janusz Jędrzejewicz; Leon Kozłowski; Walery Sławek; Marian Zyndram-Kościałkowski; Felicjan Sławoj Składkowski
- Preceded by: Stanisław Wojciechowski
- Succeeded by: Władysław Raczkiewicz

Personal details
- Born: 1 December 1867 Mierzanowo, Congress Poland, Russian Empire
- Died: 2 October 1946 (aged 78) Versoix, Geneva, Switzerland
- Resting place: St. John's Archcathedral
- Party: Independent (from 1892)
- Other political affiliations: Proletariat (until 1892)
- Spouses: Michalina Czyżewska (m. 1892; died 1932) Maria Dobrzańska (m. 1933)
- Children: 4
- Profession: Chemist; politician
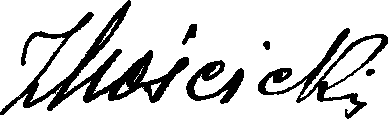
- Signature

Ignacy Mościcki (Polish: [iɡˈnat͡sɨ mɔɕˈt͡ɕit͡skʲi]; 1 December 1867 – 2 October 1946) was a Polish chemist and politician who was the country's president from 1926 to 1939. He was the longest serving president in Polish history. Mościcki was the president of Poland when Germany invaded the country on 1 September 1939 and started World War II.

== Early life and career ==
Mościcki was born on 1 December 1867 in Mierzanowo, a small village near Ciechanów, Congress Poland. After completing school in Warsaw, he studied chemistry at the Riga Polytechnicum, where he joined the Polish underground leftist organisation, Proletariat.

Upon graduating, he returned to Warsaw where he married Michalina Czyżewska but was soon threatened by the Tsarist secret police with life imprisonment in Siberia and was forced to emigrate with his family in 1892 to London. In 1896, he was offered an assistantship at the University of Fribourg in Switzerland. There, he patented a method for cheap industrial production of nitric acid.

In 1912, Mościcki moved to Lwów, in the Kingdom of Galicia and Lodomeria, in Austria-Hungary, where he accepted a chair in physical chemistry and technical electrochemistry at the Lwów Polytechnic. In 1925, he was elected rector of the Lwów Polytechnic (as it was then called), but soon moved to Warsaw to continue his research at the Warsaw Polytechnic. In 1926, he became an honorary member of the Polish Chemical Society.

== Presidency ==
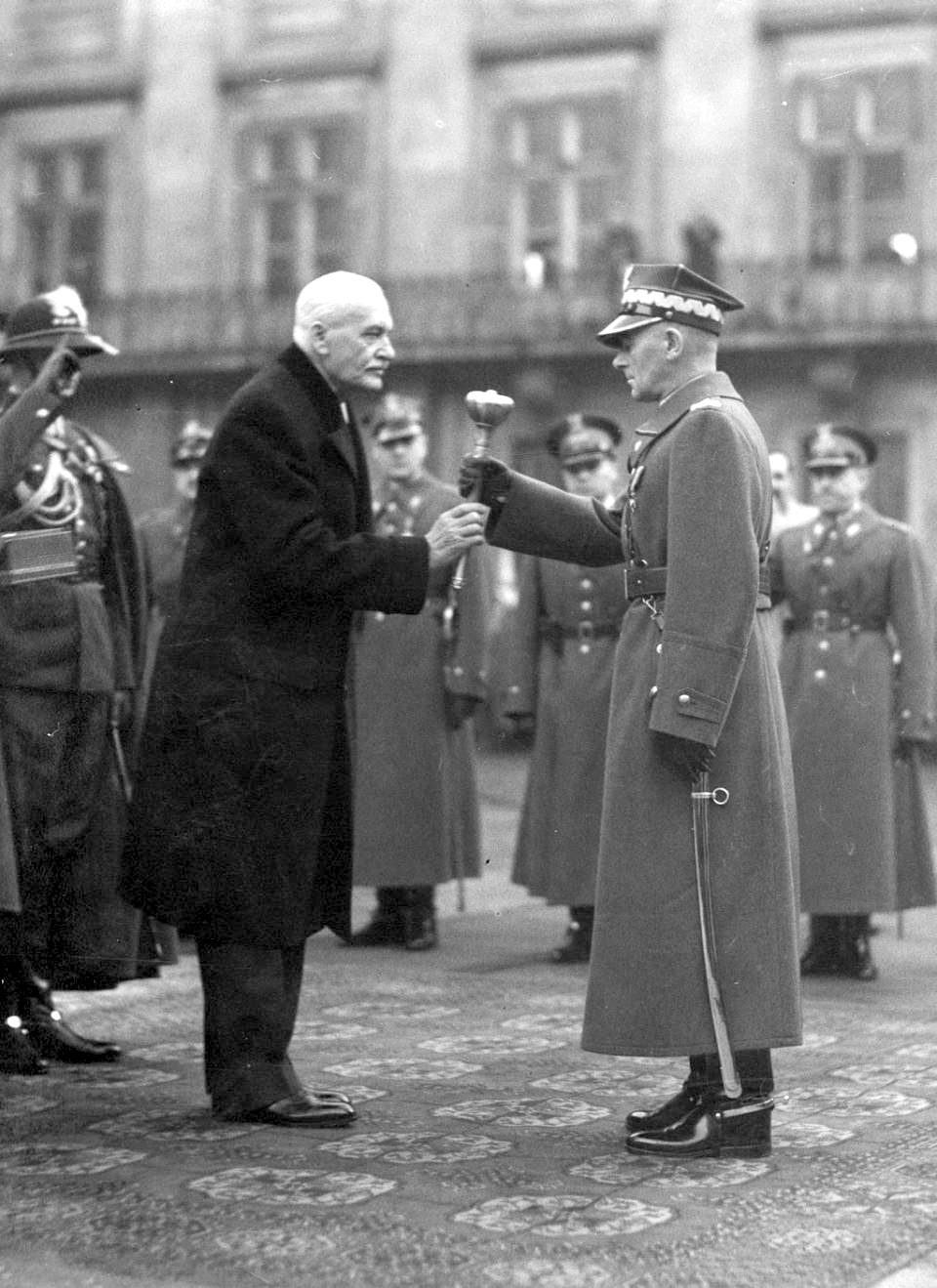
Mościcki bestows the buława (the Marshal of Poland's baton) on Edward Rydz-Śmigły in 1936

After Józef Piłsudski's May 1926 coup d'état, Mościcki, once an associate of Piłsudski in the Polish Socialist Party, was elected President of Poland on 1 June 1926 by the National Assembly on the recommendation of Piłsudski, who had refused the post for himself.

As president, Mościcki was subservient to Piłsudski and never openly showed dissent from any aspect of the Marshal's leadership. After Piłsudski's death in 1935, his followers divided into three main factions: those supporting Mościcki as Piłsudski's successor, those supporting General Edward Rydz-Śmigły and those supporting Prime Minister Walery Sławek.

With a view to eliminating Sławek from the game, Mościcki concluded a power-sharing agreement with Rydz-Śmigły, which had caused Sławek to be marginalised as a serious political player by the end of the year. As a result of the agreement, Rydz-Śmigły would become the de facto leader of Poland until the outbreak of the war, and Mościcki remained influential by continuing in office as president.

Mościcki was the leading moderate figure in the regime, which was referred to as the "colonels' government" because of the major presence of military officers in the Polish government. Mościcki opposed many of the nationalist excesses of the more right-wing Rydz-Śmigły, but their pact remained more or less intact.

Mościcki remained president until September 1939, when he was interned in Romania after the German invasion of Poland and was forced by France to resign his office. He transferred the office to General Bolesław Wieniawa-Długoszowski, who held it for only one day before General Władysław Sikorski and the French government ousted him in favour of Władysław Raczkiewicz.

== Later life ==
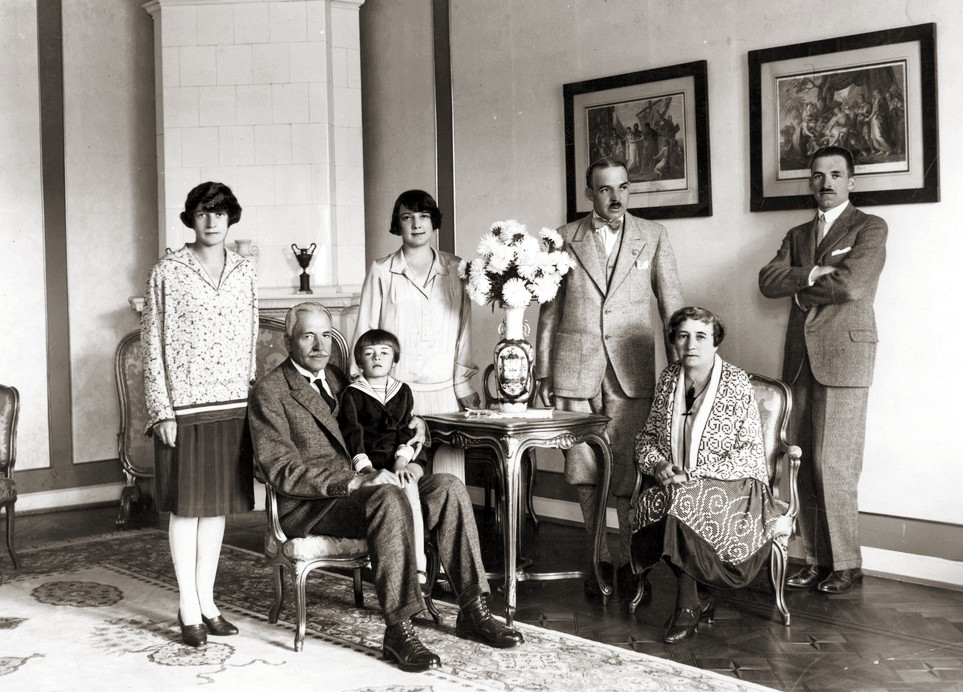
Mościcki with his family (1930)

Mościcki was planning to leave for Switzerland after leaving office as president. From 1908 to 1920, he was a citizen of Switzerland; he was also an honorary citizen of Fribourg. The Romanian authorities gave their provisional consent to his departure, but Germany opposed it. Mościcki was offered to the United States President Franklin Roosevelt, who was determined to have Mościcki go to Switzerland. The intervention of the United States government forced the Romanian authorities to agree. General Sikorski also ordered the Polish embassy in Bucharest to provide all assistance to Mościcki. The president stayed in Romania until December 1939.

Mościcki came to Switzerland through Milan, where he met with Bolesław Wieniawa-Długoszowski. Initially, he lived in Fribourg, where he was allowed to continue his scientific work. During this period, among others, he wrote down his memories, which were published by the New York City magazine Independence. Mościcki donated money to soldiers of the Polish Army in France, Warsaw residents in prisoner-of-war camps, concentration camps and labour camps. For five months, he taught at the University of Fribourg. Later, he was forced to take up paid work. In 1940, he moved to Geneva, where he worked in the Hydro-Nitro Chemical Laboratory.

Mościcki's health deteriorated rapidly after 1943. He died on 2 October 1946, in Versoix, near Geneva, and was buried at the cemetery of the town. His daughter Helena (1897–1962) and her second husband Aleksander Bobkowski (1885–1966) were buried next to him.

== Legacy ==
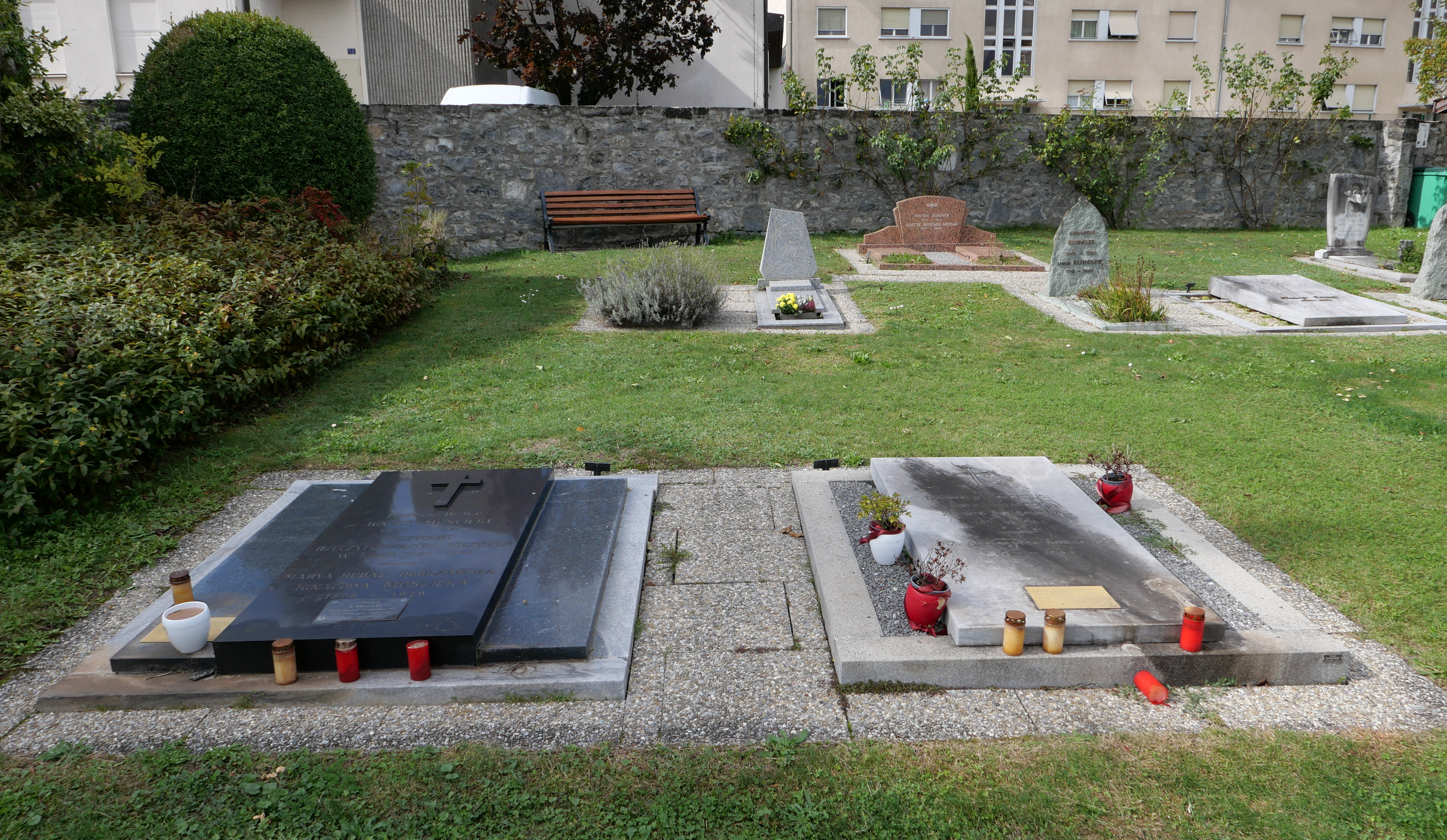
The former graves of Mościcki (left) and of his daughter Helena and son-in-law Aleksander Bobkowski (right) in Versoix.

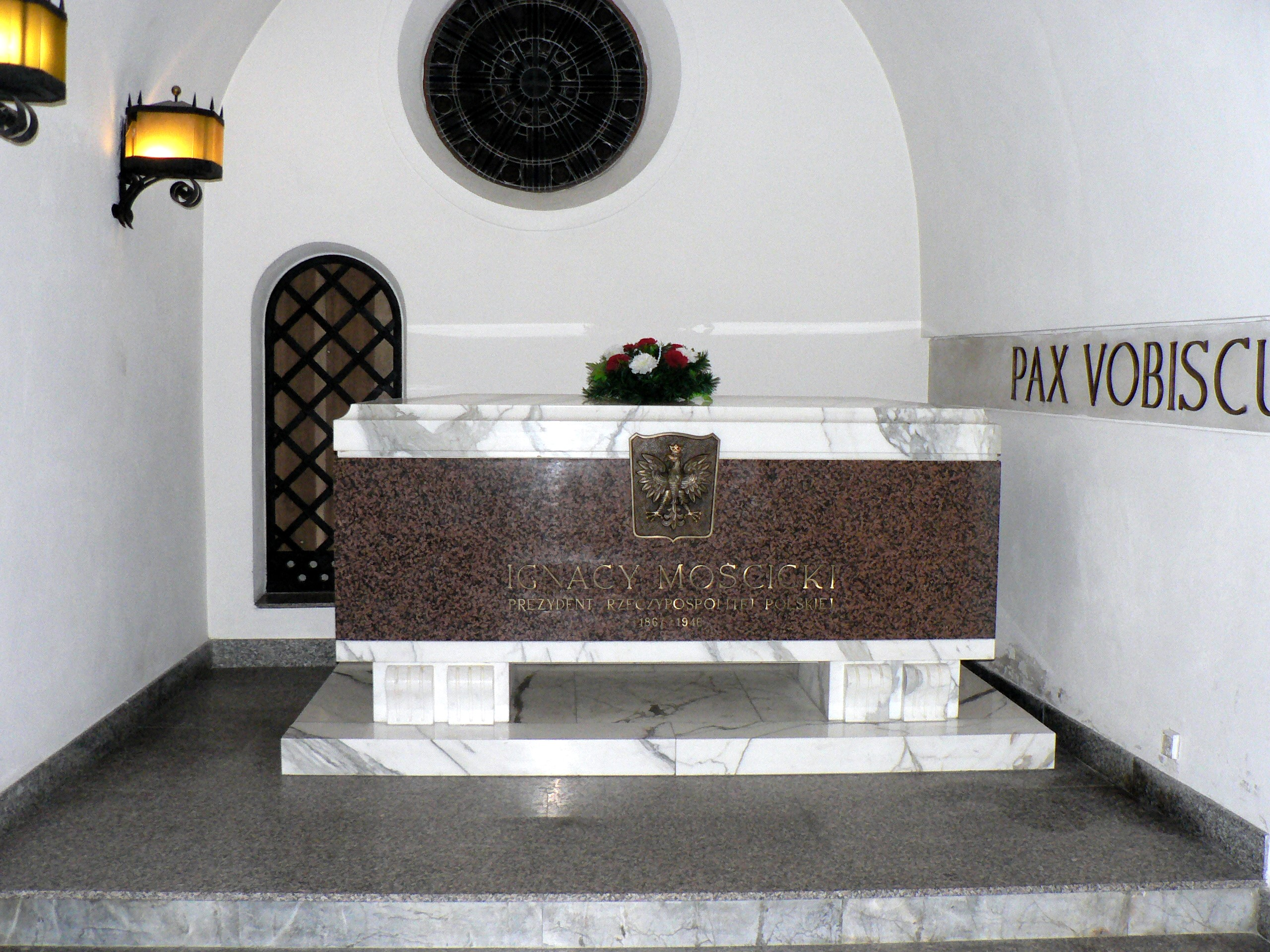
The grave in the basement of the St. John's Archcathedral, Warsaw

In 1984, his descendants requested that the remains of Mościcki and his wife be moved from Switzerland to Poland. The relevant Polish authorities agreed that a funeral was to be held in Warsaw and be completely private, without any state ceremonies. However, the authorities of the Canton of Geneva in Switzerland withdrew their agreement for political reasons after protests related to Solidarity from emigrants. On 10 September 1993, Mościcki's remains were exhumed from the cemetery of Versoix and transported to Poland. Three days later, they were deposited on behalf of incumbent President Lech Wałęsa in the crypt of St. John's Archcathedral, Warsaw. Mościcki's symbolic grave is located in the Avenue of Merit at the Powązki Cemetery in Warsaw, where his second wife is buried next to him.

The mortal remains of his daughter, Helena and her husband, Aleksander Bobkowski, were also moved in September 1993 to the Mościcki family tomb at the Powązki Cemetery in Warsaw

== Gallery ==
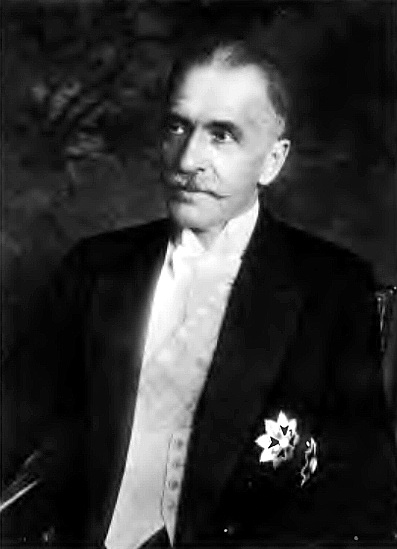
President of Poland around 1928

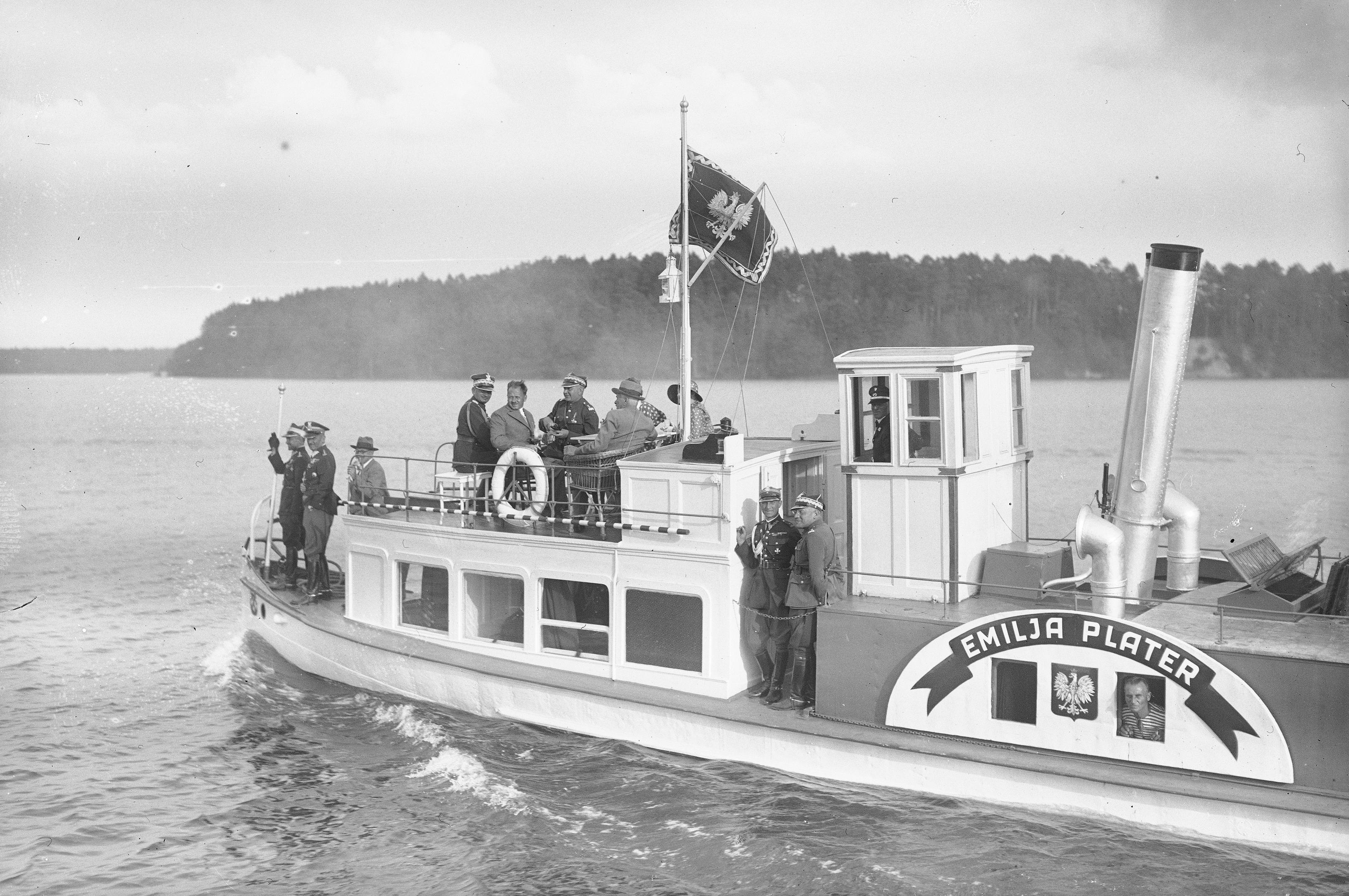
Polish president on presidential yacht in Augustów, 1932

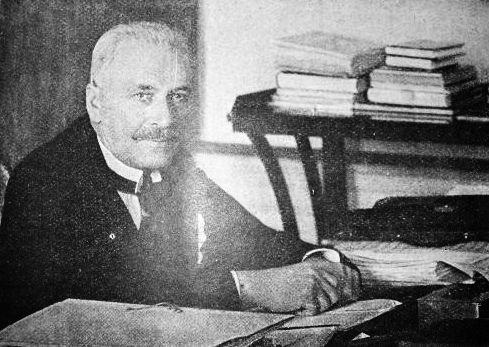
President Mościcki in his office, 1934

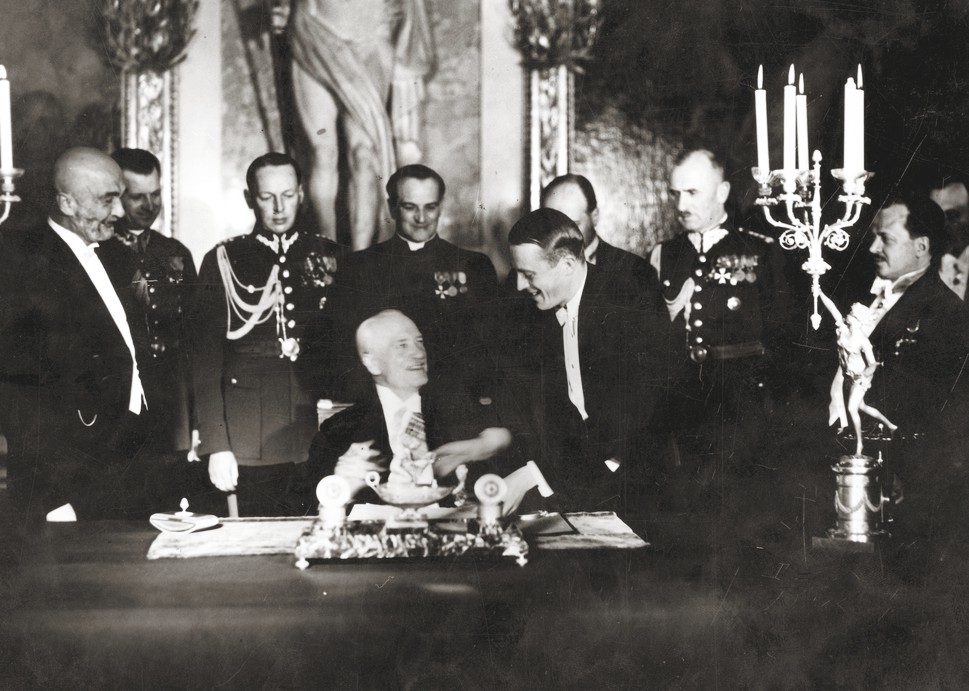
April's Constitution

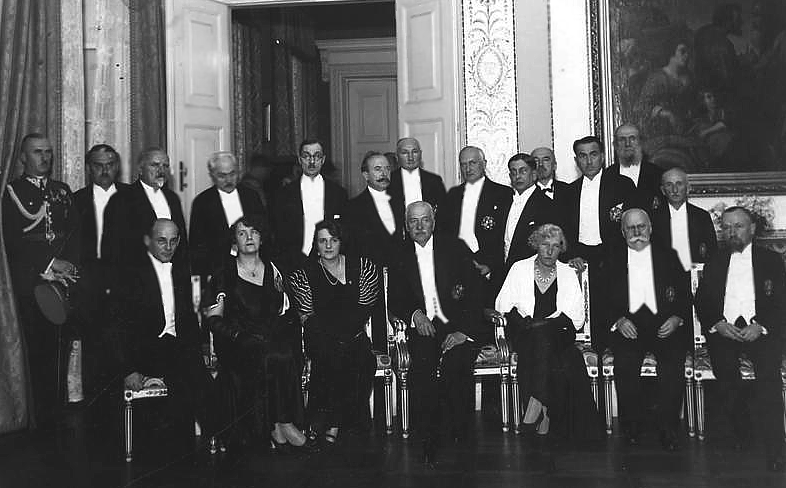
Session of the Polish Academy of Literature in 1933

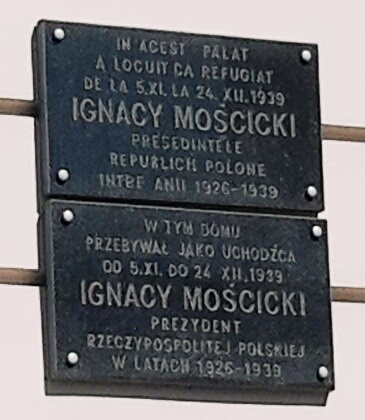
Plaque commemorating Mościcki's stay as a refugee in the Mihail Constantine Palace in Romania.

== Awards ==
- Latvia: Order of the Three Stars, 1st Class with Collar (17 November 1928)

== See also ==
- Invasion of Poland
- Mościce
- List of Poles

Political offices
Preceded by Maciej Rataj	President of Poland; 1926–1939	Succeeded by Bolesław Wieniawa-Długoszowski as President of the Polish Republic in Exile
Preceded by Maciej Rataj	President of Poland; 1926–1939	Vacant Title next held by Bolesław Bierut
