= Headquarters of the Polish National Radio Symphony Orchestra in Katowice =

Concert hall in Katowice, Poland

- Siedziba Narodowej Orkiestry Symfonicznej Polskiego Radia w Katowicach
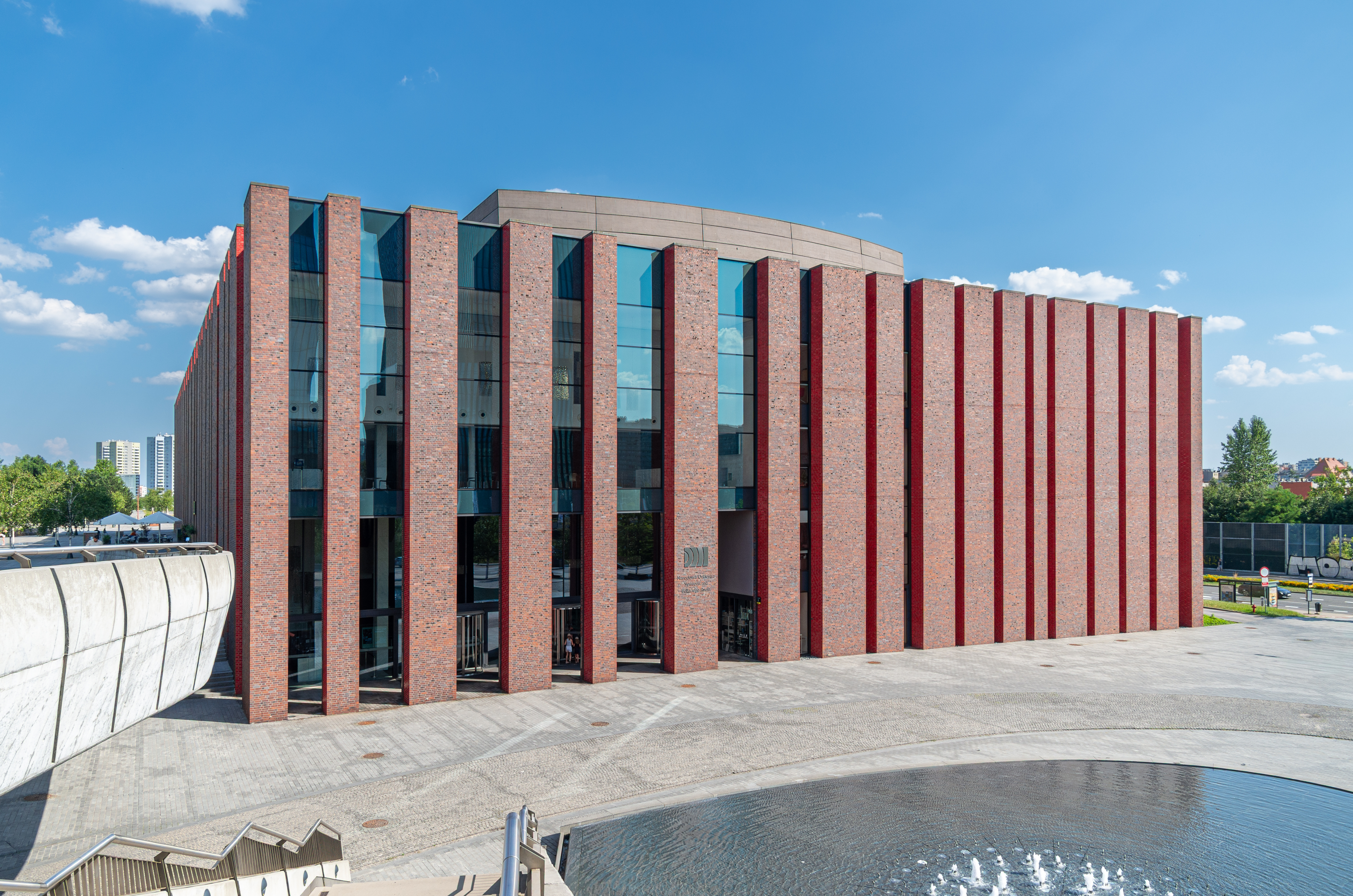
- Front view of the building (2026)

- Location within Poland

General information
- Type: Concert hall
- Location: Katowice, Silesian Voivodeship, 1 Wojciech Kilar Square, Poland
- Coordinates: 50°15′50.1″N 19°01′43.5″E
- Construction started: February 2012
- Completed: August 2014
- Client: City of Katowice

Height
- Height: 28 m (92 ft)

Technical details
- Floor area: 25,782 m^{2} (277,520 sq ft)

Design and construction
- Architect: Tomasz Konior

Website
- nospr.org.pl

The Headquarters of the Polish National Radio Symphony Orchestra in Katowice is a concert hall located at 1 Wojciech Kilar Square in the Bogucice district of Katowice, Poland. It serves as the home of the Polish National Radio Symphony Orchestra.It is also a main component of the Katowice Culture Zone, which also includes the International Congress Centre and the Silesian Museum.

Constructed on the site of a former timber storage area of the Katowice Coal Mine, the building was officially opened on 1 October 2014. Designed by local architect Tomasz Konior, the structure draws inspiration from the architectural heritage of Upper Silesia, particularly the Nikiszowiec workers' housing estate. The concert hall has received numerous architectural awards for its design and cultural significance.

At the time of its opening, the concert hall was the largest concert and recording complex in Poland. In 2019, it joined the European Concert Hall Organisation, a network of European concert venues. Since its inauguration, the venue has become a highly popular cultural hub in Katowice, hosting performances by renowned artists and musical ensembles.

== Location ==
The Headquarters of the Polish National Radio Symphony Orchestra is located at 1 Wojciech Kilar Square. It lies within the Bogucice district of Katowice, in the southwestern part, near the borders with Koszutka and Śródmieście.

The building is situated in the Katowice Culture Zone, adjacent to the Silesian Museum, the International Congress Centre, and the Spodek arena. A pedestrian bridge connects it to the International Congress Centre and Spodek. Together with other Culture Zone structures, it forms a hub of facilities for education, culture, and large-scale events, sharing technical infrastructure and green spaces.

Constructed on former mining land near above-ground and underground roads, the building is positioned between T. Dobrowolski Street, H. M. Górecki Street, Wojciech Korfanty Avenue, and Walenty Roździeński Avenue.

A tram line runs along Wojciech Korfanty Avenue. The Metropolitan Transport Authority's Katowice Rondo tram stop is approximately 300 metres from the building's main entrance. In October 2022, 10 tram lines operated from this stop, connecting the concert hall directly to Katowice districts such as Dąb, Brynów-Osiedle Zgrzebnioka, Koszutka, Osiedle Tysiąclecia, Śródmieście, Wełnowiec-Józefowiec, and Zawodzie, as well as the cities of Bytom, Chorzów, Siemianowice Śląskie, and Świętochłowice.

Approximately 20 metres south of the building, along Walenty Roździeński Avenue, is the Katowice Culture Zone NOSPR bus stop. In October 2022, about 20 bus lines operated from this stop, linking the concert hall with Katowice districts including Dąbrówka Mała, Dąb, Giszowiec, Janów-Nikiszowiec, Koszutka, Murcki, Osiedle Tysiąclecia, Szopienice-Burowiec, Śródmieście, Wełnowiec-Józefowiec, and Zawodzie, and cities such as Będzin, Dąbrowa Górnicza, Mysłowice, Siemianowice Śląskie, Sosnowiec, and Siewierz.

A Metrorower city bike station, number 27704, operates in the parking lot adjacent to the building.

== History ==
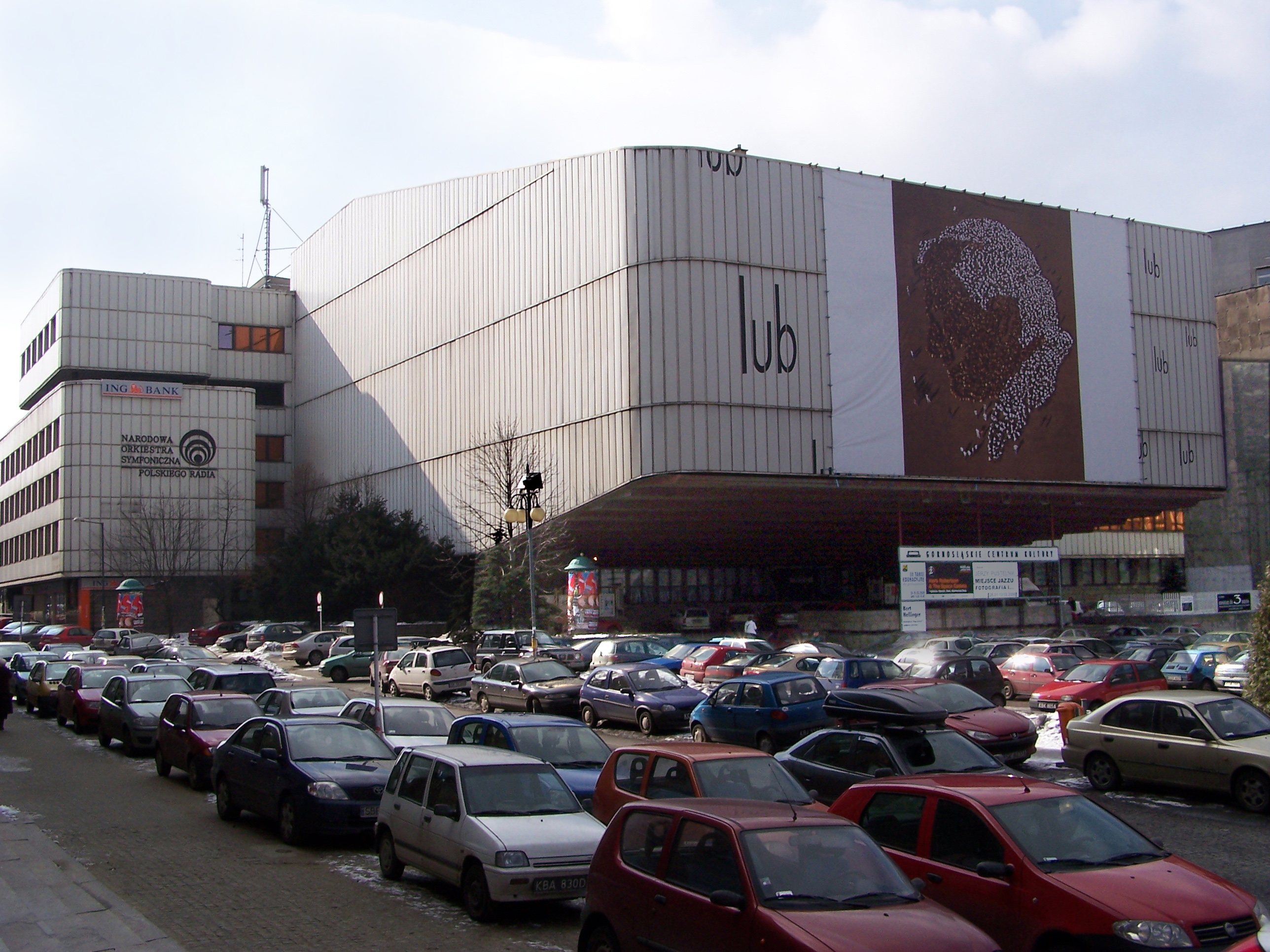
So-called Dezember Palast at 2 Silesian Parliament Square in 2009, the former Polish National Radio Symphony Orchestra headquarters; the orchestra's logo is visible on the left side of the facade

The new Polish National Radio Symphony Orchestra's headquarters addressed longstanding spatial limitations faced by the orchestra since its reactivation in 1945. Previously, the orchestra was based on one floor of the so-called Dezember Palast at 2 Silesian Parliament Square, which lacked adequate concert and recording facilities. Discussions about building a new concert hall had persisted for years. In that venue, musicians struggled to hear each other due to the hall's design, prioritizing audience acoustics over performers' needs. The orchestra's final performance at the former Katowice Cultural Centre was held on 13 June 2013.

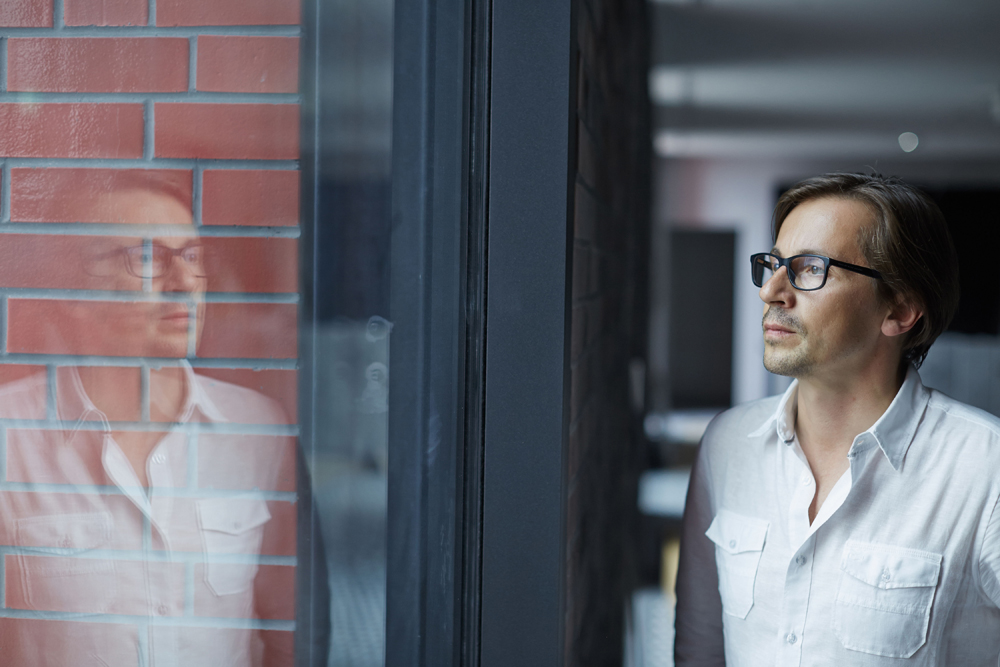
Tomasz Konior, architect of the building, photographed inside its atrium

In 2008, Katowice, in collaboration with the Warsaw and Katowice branches of the Association of Polish Architects, announced an international architectural competition for the building's design. 17 proposals were submitted by Polish and international architectural firms. The project required consideration of its unique context, as the building was to be constructed on a large post-industrial site east of Spodek, along Walenty Roździeński Avenue. This land was previously used as a timber yard by the Katowice Coal Mine, closed in 1999.

The competition was decided on 15 December 2008, with the first prize awarded to local architect Tomasz Konior. Konior had prior experience with music-related projects, including the 2007 opening of the new wing of the Karol Szymanowski Academy of Music, the Symfonia Centre for Science and Music Education, which received multiple awards, and a redesign of the interiors of the historic Academy of Music building four years earlier.

In October 2010, the project received over 122 million PLN in funding from the European Union. In June 2011, Katowice secured a 254.2 million PLN loan from the European Investment Bank to finance cultural facilities on post-industrial land, including the orchestra building.

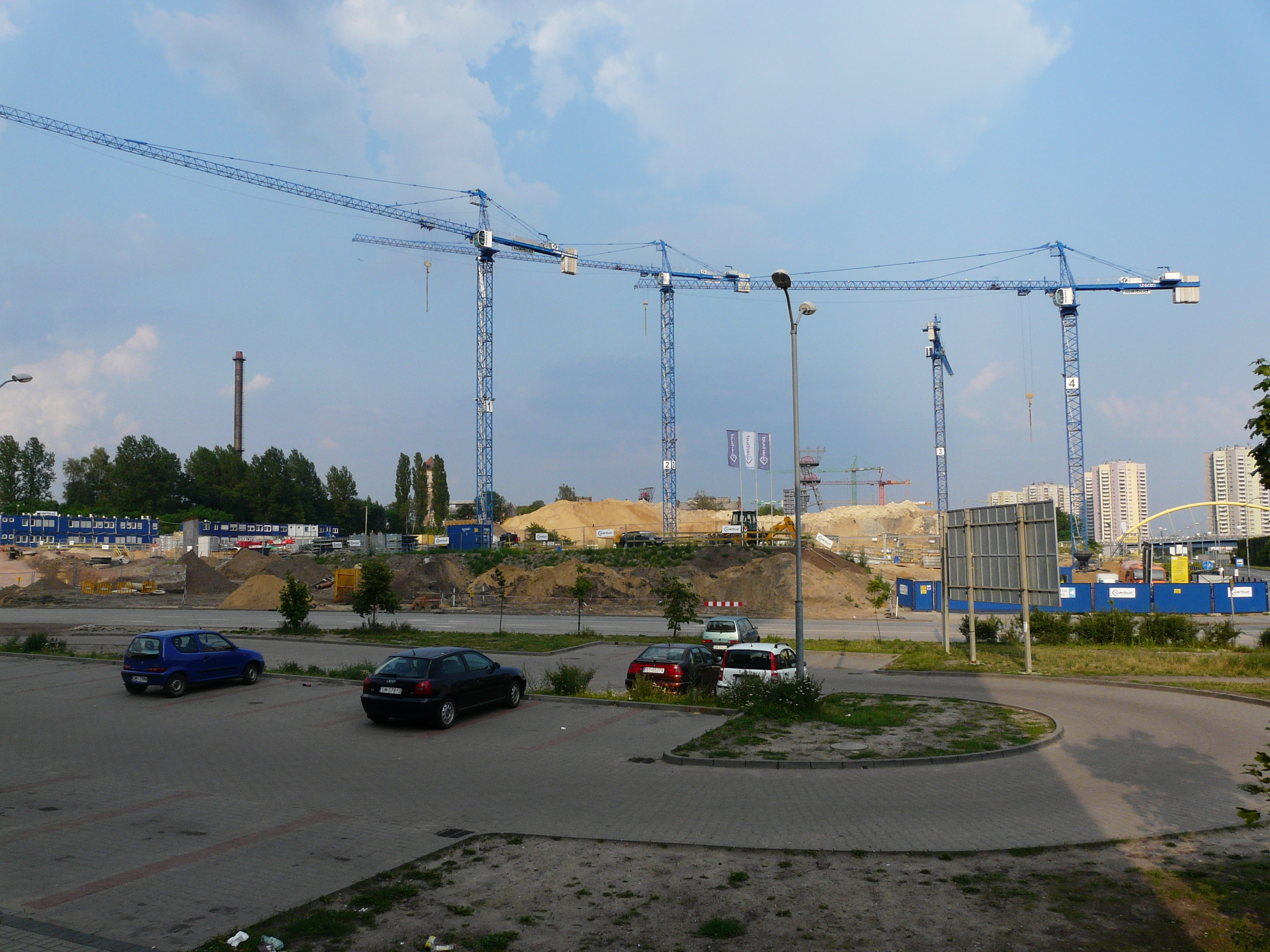
Construction of the concert hall in mid-July 2012, viewed from the west

An invitation to tender for the construction was announced in February 2011. Four companies were invited to submit bids: a consortium led by Hydrobudowa Polska with Spanish OHL, a consortium of Mostostal Warszawa with Karmar, Bouygues Batiment International, and Acciona Infraestructuras, a consortium of Warbud with LTT and Ebud-Przemysłówka, and Polimex-Mostostal. Warbud's consortium submitted the lowest bid at 191 million PLN net, followed by Mostostal Warszawa's consortium, compared to an estimated cost of 201.8 million PLN net. In December 2011, Warbud was selected as the general contractor.

On 13 February 2012, Katowice Mayor Piotr Uszok signed the construction contract with Warbud, with completion planned for 13 October 2013. In June 2011, an acoustic model of the concert hall, built in Aleksandrów Łódzki, was displayed in the lobby of Katowice's Altus Skyscraper, as part of the city's bid for the European Capital of Culture 2016. It was accompanied by visualizations of the new concert hall building.

The cornerstone was laid on 6 June 2012. By August 2012, all underground walls, columns, and ceilings were completed, while above-ground walls and columns around the Great Concert Hall were finished, and steel structures and ceilings above the second floor were being installed. By December 2012, external walls reached the fourth floor, and glass facade installation began on the western side, with approximately 300 workers involved.

In February 2013, roof elements for the Great Concert Hall, weighing over 300 tons, were being installed, including 11 girders. The hall's undulating concrete walls were completed using rubber formwork, and structural work in the Chamber Hall was finished, with installation work ongoing at the -1 level. Window installations were nearly complete on the northern, southern, and partially western sides. On 12 April 2013, a topping out ceremony marked the completion of reinforced concrete work, with the first concert held in the Great Concert Hall, and insulation layer installation began.

By November 2013, brick facade installation was complete, and the surrounding area was being landscaped with trees and small architectural elements. Interior finishing included balcony installation in the Great Concert Hall, ceiling and plafond completion, and wall and ceiling cladding in the Chamber Hall, with approximately 500 workers involved.

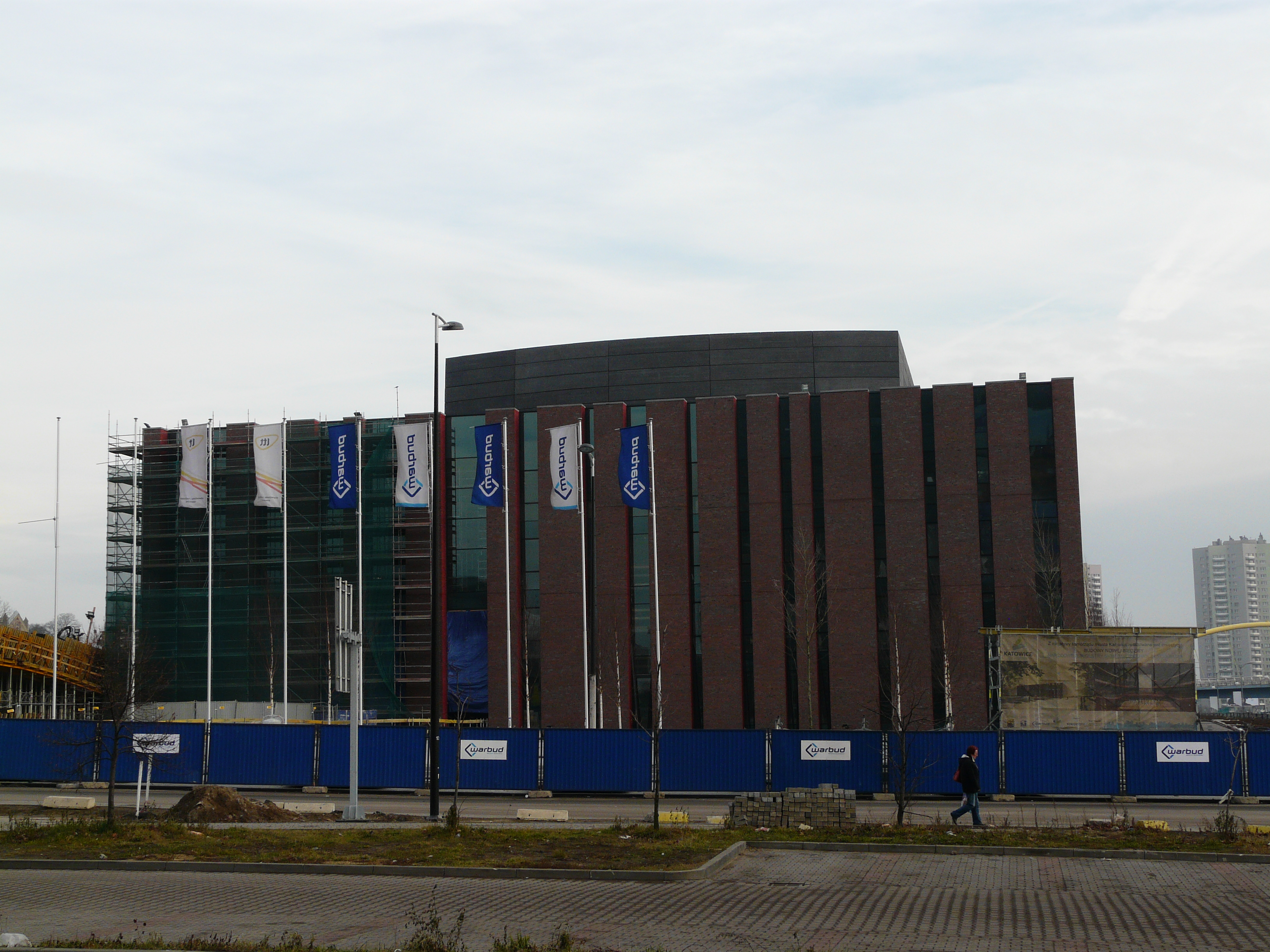
Construction of the NOSPR building at the end of 2013, viewed from the front

By August 2014, construction neared completion with the final equipment installation and acoustic testing in the Great Concert Hall. Construction concluded in August 2014, and the building was handed over to the orchestra on 25 August 2014, following acoustic tests.

The total cost of the project, including construction, design documentation, supervision, acoustic work, tree planting, utility relocations, drainage, and hall equipment, was 333,160,737.84 PLN.

The grand opening took place on 1 October 2014, coinciding with International Music Day. The inaugural concert featured works by composers associated with the orchestra, including Witold Lutosławski, Krzysztof Penderecki, Henryk Górecki, and Wojciech Kilar, with a performance by Polish pianist Krystian Zimerman in the second half. It was the first new facility to open in the Culture Zone.

The new headquarters has become a popular venue, attracting visitors with its architecture and diverse events. In 2014, season ticket sales increased by 300% compared to the old venue. Its varied programming draws audiences from Katowice, the Silesian Voivodeship, and beyond.

The venue has hosted numerous events, including the Nowa Muzyka Festival, the Fryderyk Awards Gala for Classical Music, the Katowice Kultura Natura project, and the Polish Contemporary Music Premieres Festival. Renowned orchestras such as the Vienna Philharmonic and London Symphony Orchestra, ensembles like Camerata Silesia, Take 6, and SBB, and artists such as Bruce Liu, Andrea Bocelli, Radzimir Dębski, Krystian Zimerman, Piotr Beczała, and Piotr Anderszewski have performed here.

Other events include the Business Centre Club gala and the 2022/23 Inter-University Academic Year Inauguration.

In 2019, the NOSPR hall joined the European Concert Hall Organisation, becoming the only Polish concert hall in the group alongside 20 other European venues. In July 2021, construction began on a 13-metre-high, 6-metre-wide pipe organ in the Great Concert Hall, designed since 2017 and replacing a mock-up instrument. The organ, built by Škrabl, was completed in September 2022.

== Architecture ==
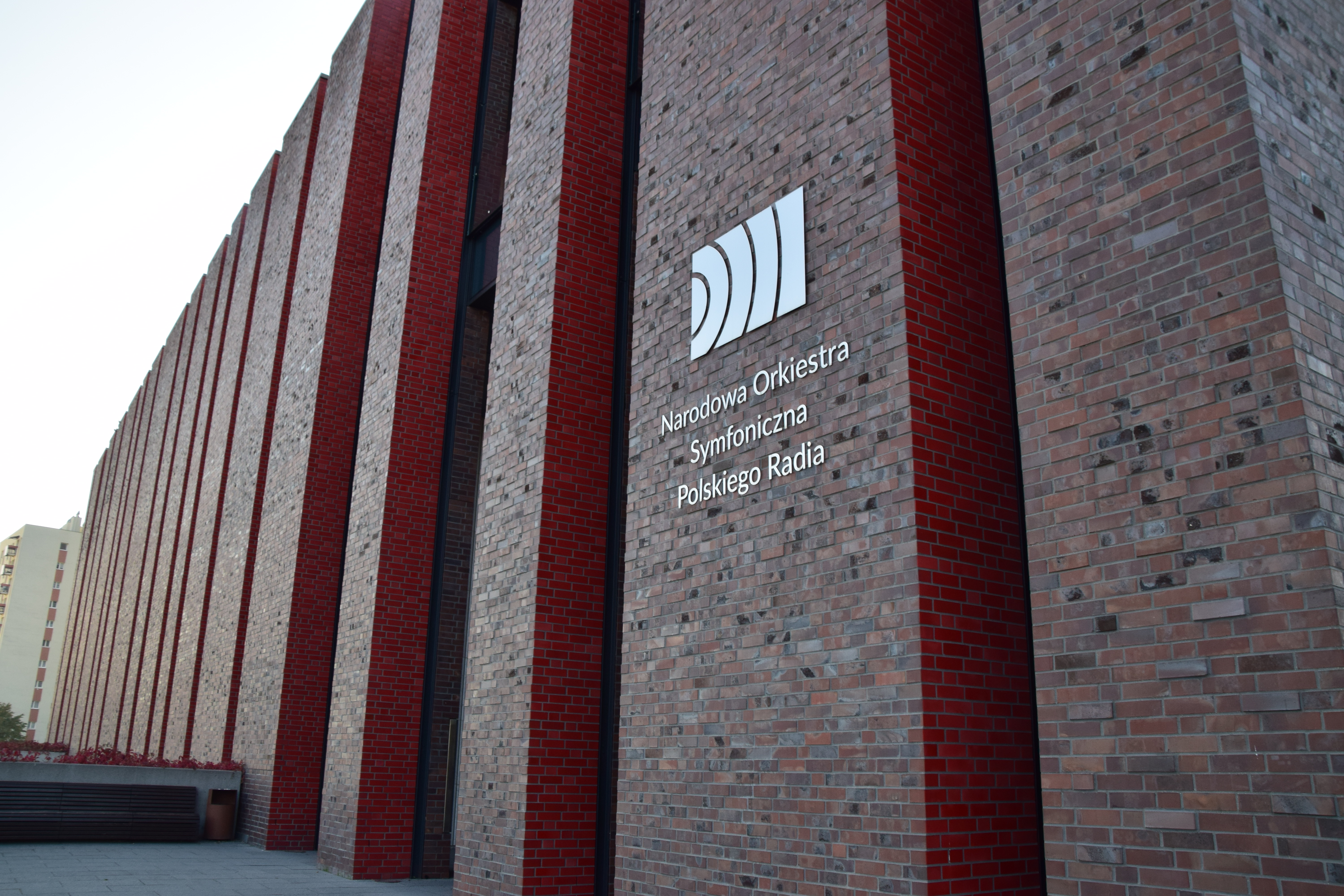
Northern facade of the building with the orchestra's logo

The Headquarters of the Polish National Radio Symphony Orchestra is Poland's largest concert and recording complex, primarily designed for classical music but adaptable for other genres. Built on a rectangular plan, it measures 115 metres long (including the technical building), 61.6 metres wide, and 28 metres high. The total area is 35,059 m², with a usable area of 25,782 m², a built-up area of 7,874 m², and a volume of 181,610 m³. The structure comprises three parts: a five-storey main building, a seven-storey Great Concert Hall, and a two-storey technical section.

The architectural design was led by Tomasz Konior of Konior Studio, with installations and structural design by Buro Happold Engineering. The building is connected to medium-voltage electricity (20kV), water, sewage, and technological heating networks, and features systems for electricity, structured cabling, fire alarms, sound warning, security, BMS, rainwater and sanitary sewage, condensate drainage, domestic hot and cold water, hydrants, central heating, technological heat, chilled water, glycol heat recovery, ventilation, smoke extraction, stairwell pressurization, and freon-based split-unit air conditioning.

=== Exterior ===
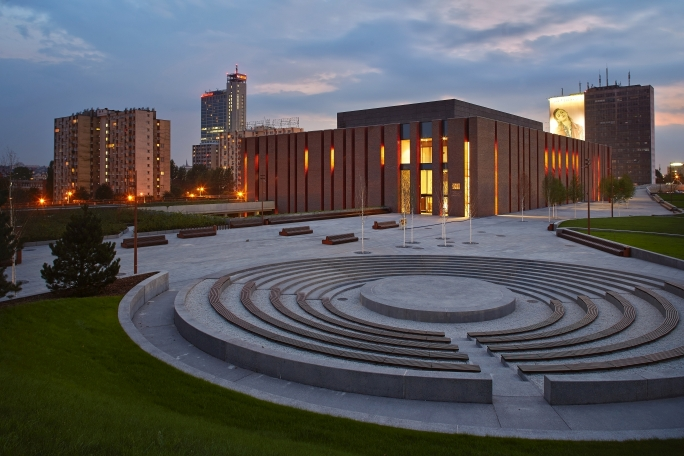
Building from the northeast, with the amphitheatre in the foreground

Tomasz Konior designed the building with a monumental yet simple form, reflecting its status as the region's main concert hall. The exterior facade draws inspiration from the windows of familok buildings in the Nikiszowiec workers' estate, evoking musical associations. The facade features brick-covered pillars, with smooth red bricks in recesses and rough bricks on walls. A total of 611,000 bricks, fired in a 19th-century Hoffman kiln at the Patoka brickworks in Panoszów, were used. Technical installations are concealed within 80 external brick chimneys, interspersed with variably sized window slits. The clinker brick facade covers 11,750 m², with 2,300 m² of glazing.

The facade's appearance varies by time of day: sunlight creates bright lines on the black concert hall walls during the day, while at night, interior light reflects between the facade pillars. The building has two entrances: the main one on the west at Wojciech Kilar Square and a secondary entrance on the east. In September 2015, a neon sign reading "Polish National Radio Symphony Orchestra" with the orchestra's logo was installed on the facade.

=== Interior facilities ===
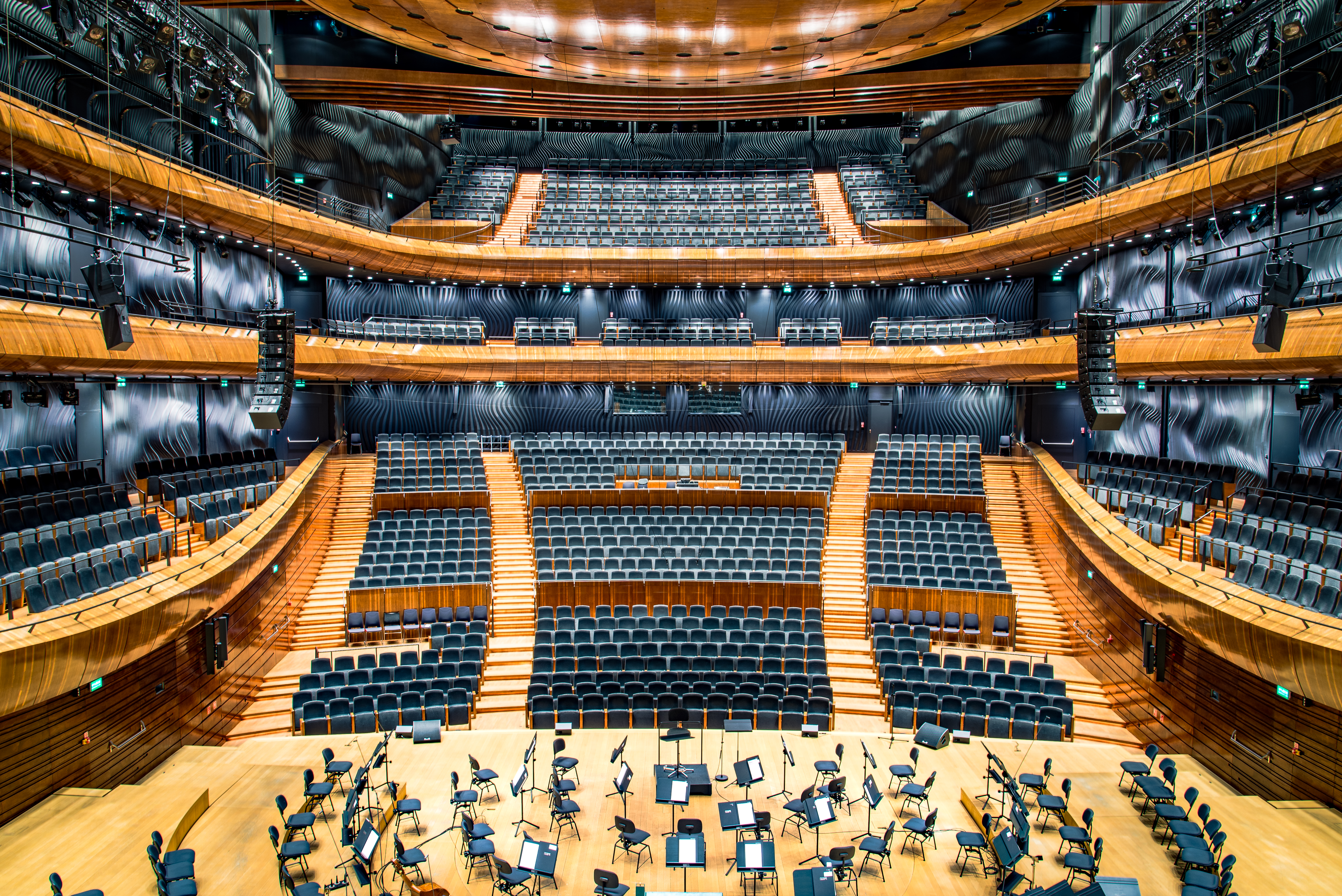
Interior of the Great Concert Hall from the east

The building includes the Great Concert Hall with 1,666 fixed seats and 128 additional seats, a Chamber Hall with 283 seats, 31 dressing rooms, four sectional rehearsal rooms, a recording studio, 37 public restrooms, a restaurant with a kitchen, an atrium with ticket offices and two cloakrooms, and administrative offices. The building contains 419 rooms in total.

At the centre is a monumental, tinted concrete structure housing the Great Concert Hall, accessible via 14 public entrances. The hall combines a traditional stage-auditorium layout with a vineyard-style arrangement, seating the audience around the orchestra for uniform sound distribution. It can accommodate a 120-member orchestra and a 100-member choir. A platform system allows flexible stage configuration. The hall's organ casing houses one of Europe's largest concert organs, completed in September 2022, with over one million parts, 105 stops, and two consoles (a four-manual stationary and a five-manual mobile).

The hall's birch wood balcony railings create a flowing line around the stage and lower levels. Seats in both halls are made of plywood and burl wood veneer, with silver-grey upholstery reflecting the hall's shimmering, undulating walls.

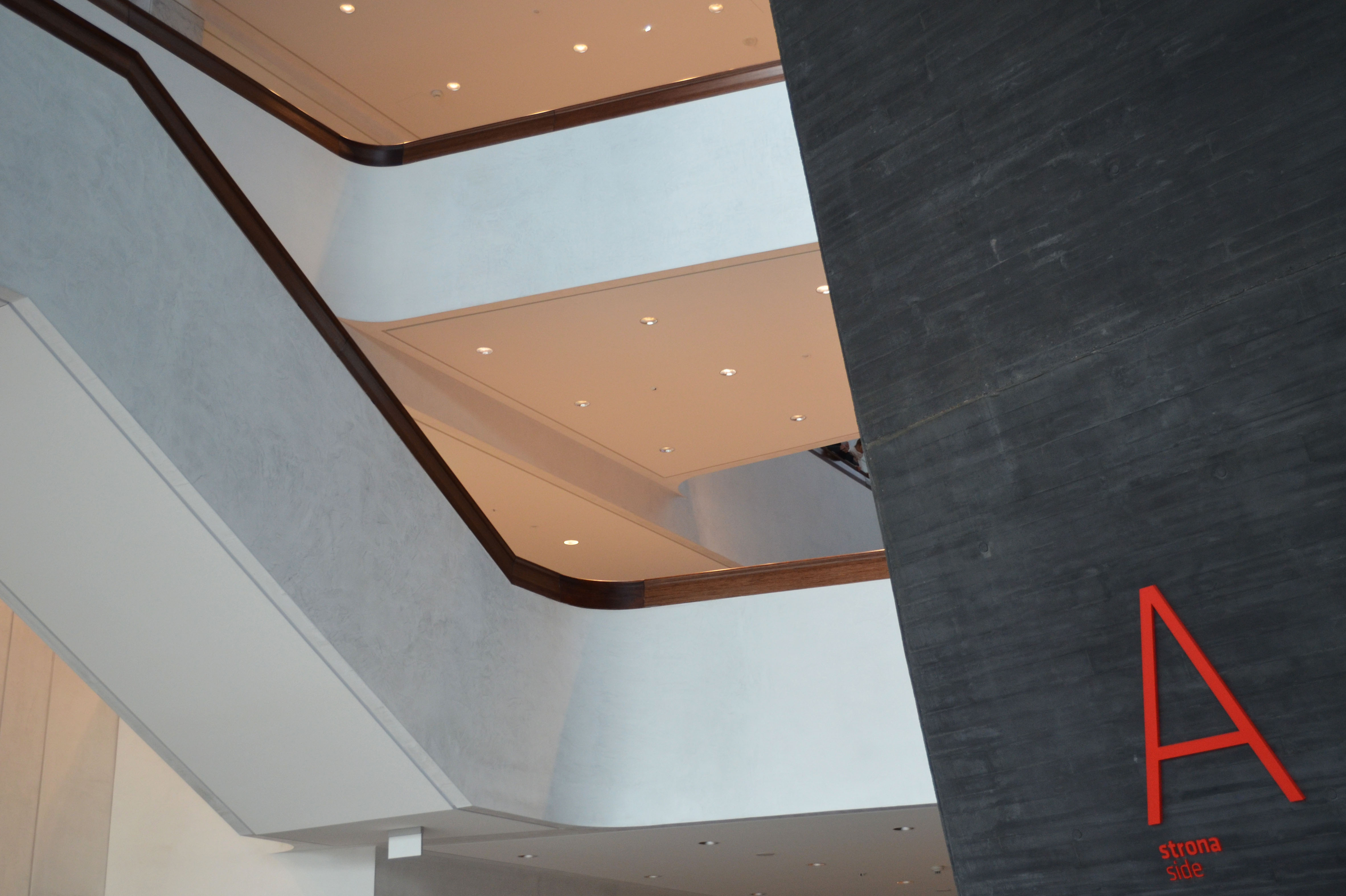
Atrium interior

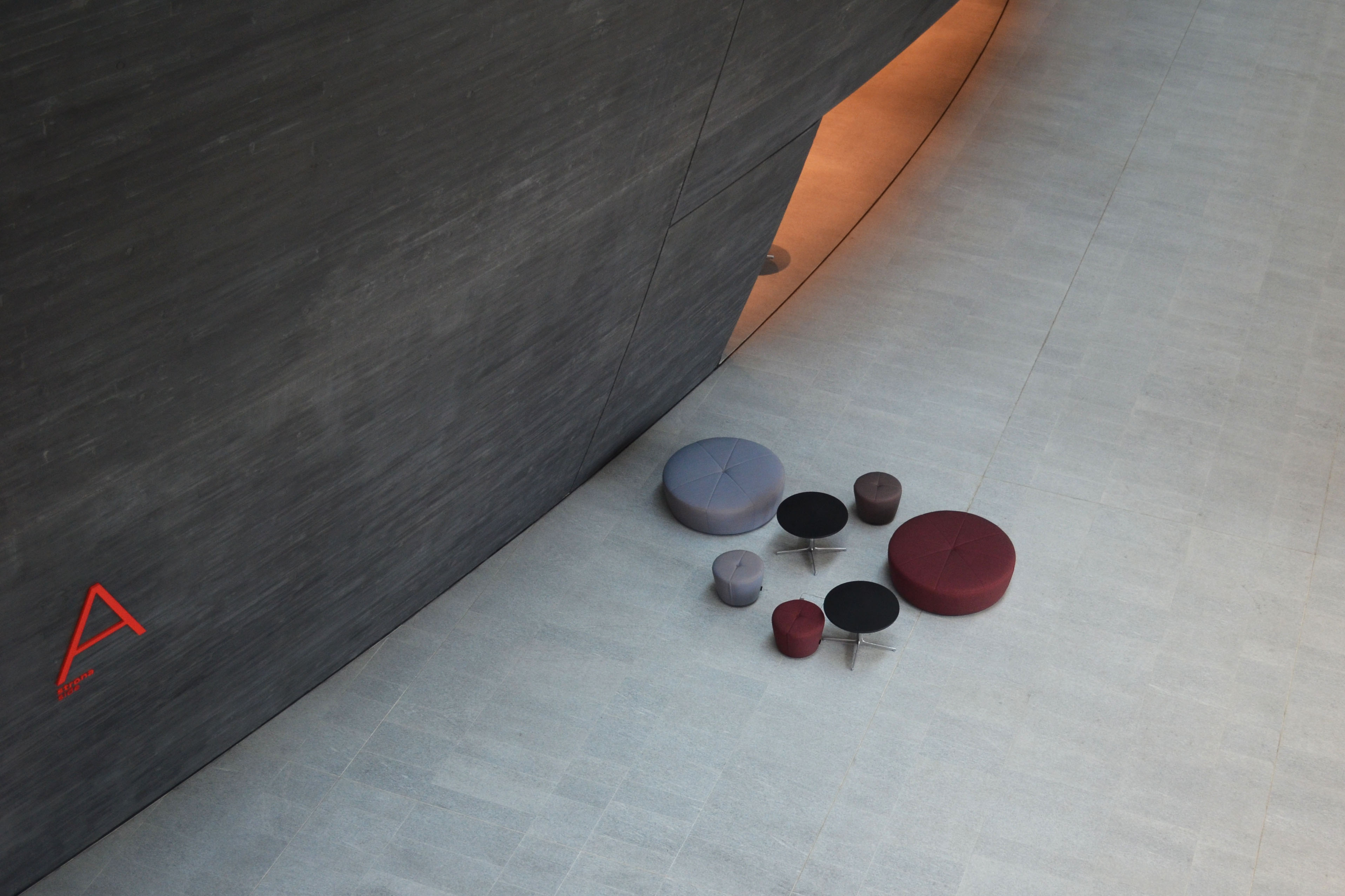
Atrium furniture

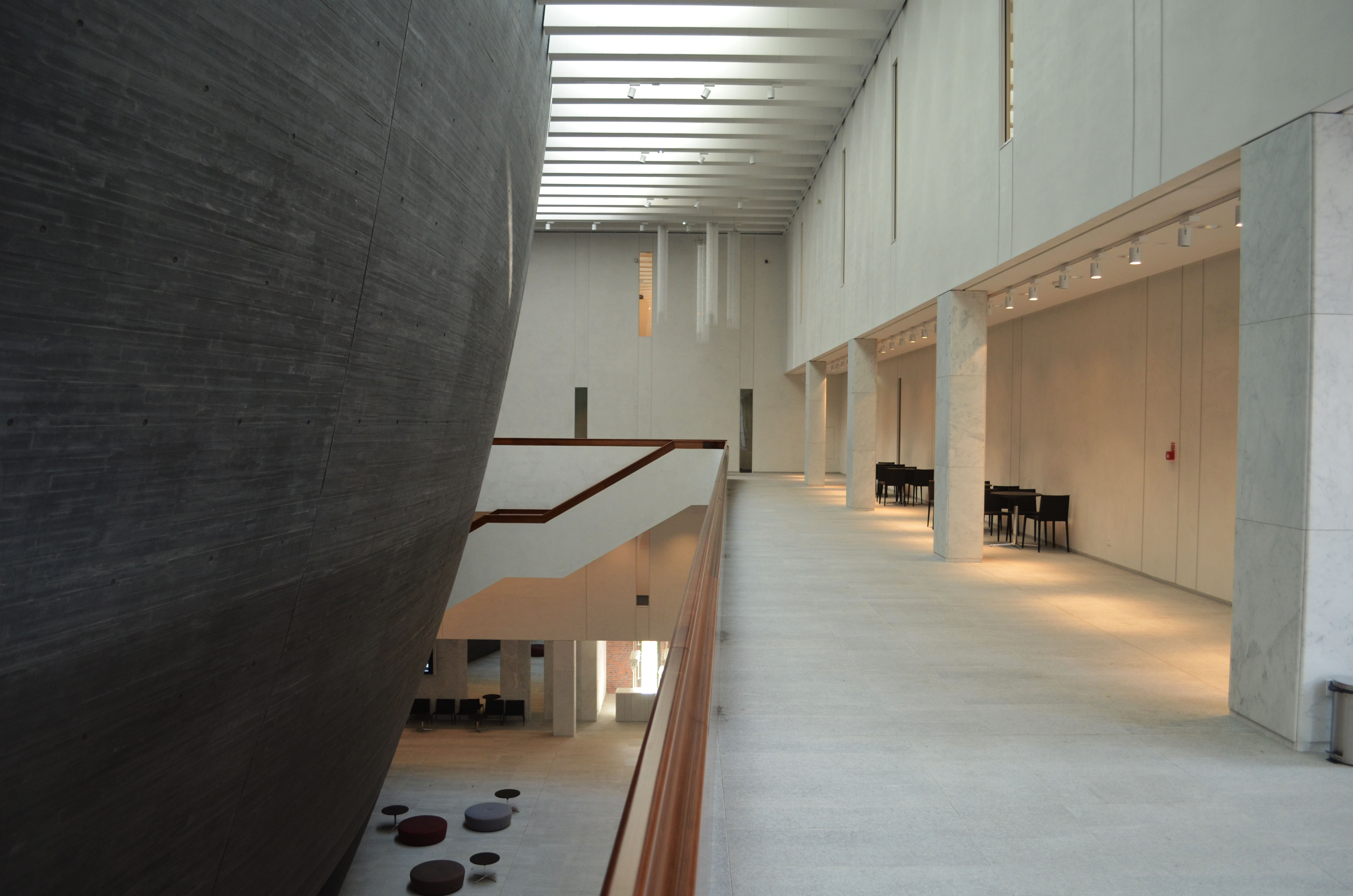
Atrium with the Great Concert Hall wall on the left

The Great Concert Hall is encircled by an outer building ring, creating an atrium between them. This public passageway is open during the building's operating hours. The interior design reflects Upper Silesian heritage, with the concert hall's graphite-black, rough concrete walls, bearing formwork traces, evoking coal or its seams, contrasting with the white-walled atrium. Minimalist furniture, lamps, and chandeliers enhance the modern aesthetic. Lighting includes 670 points to soften interior elements and 500 spotlights for concert visual effects.

The basement houses storage, prop rooms, workshops, technical facilities, and a 112-car parking garage. 13 staircases (five open) and seven elevators, including accessible ones, facilitate movement, with support systems for the hearing impaired.

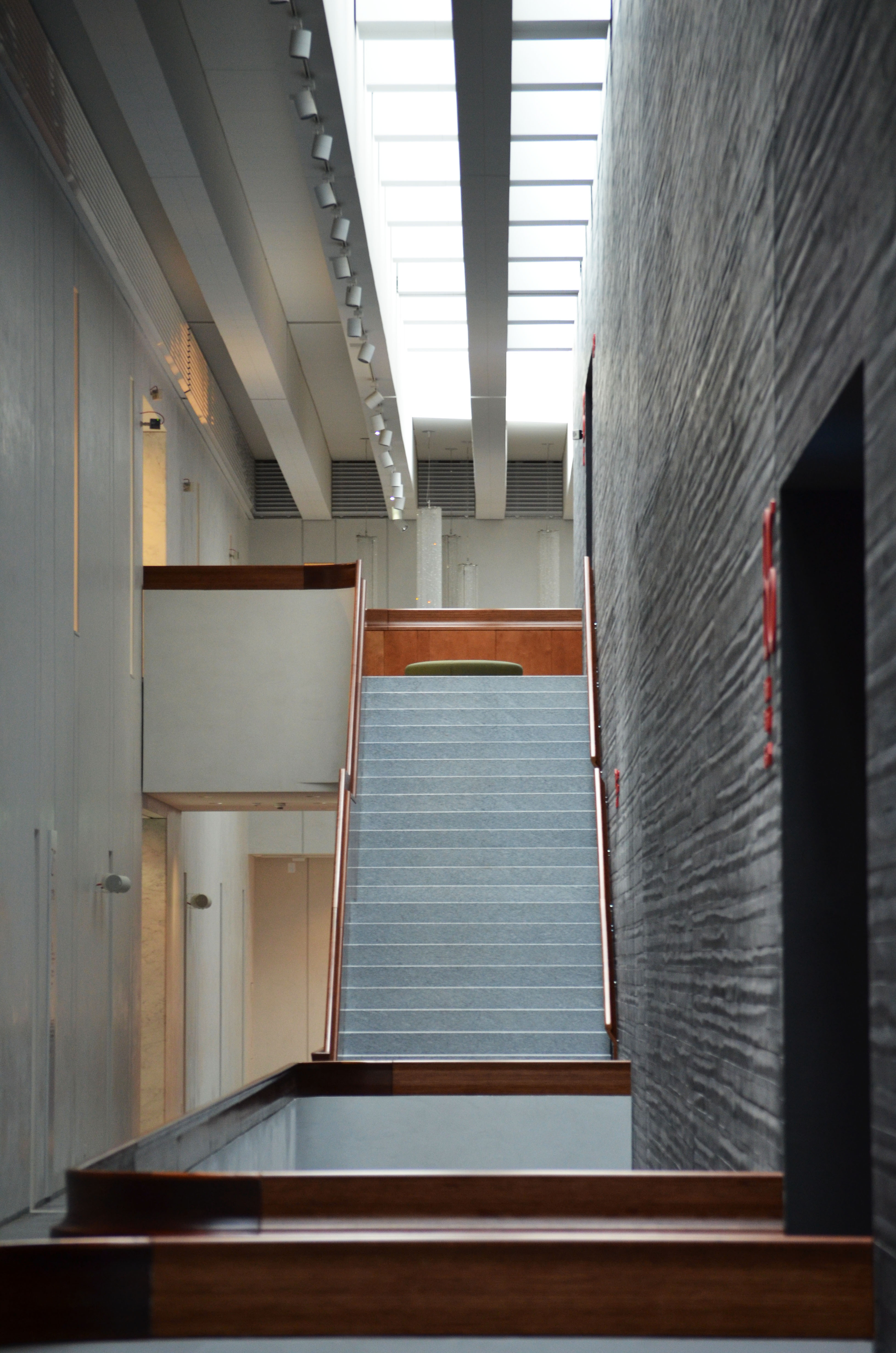
Atrium staircase

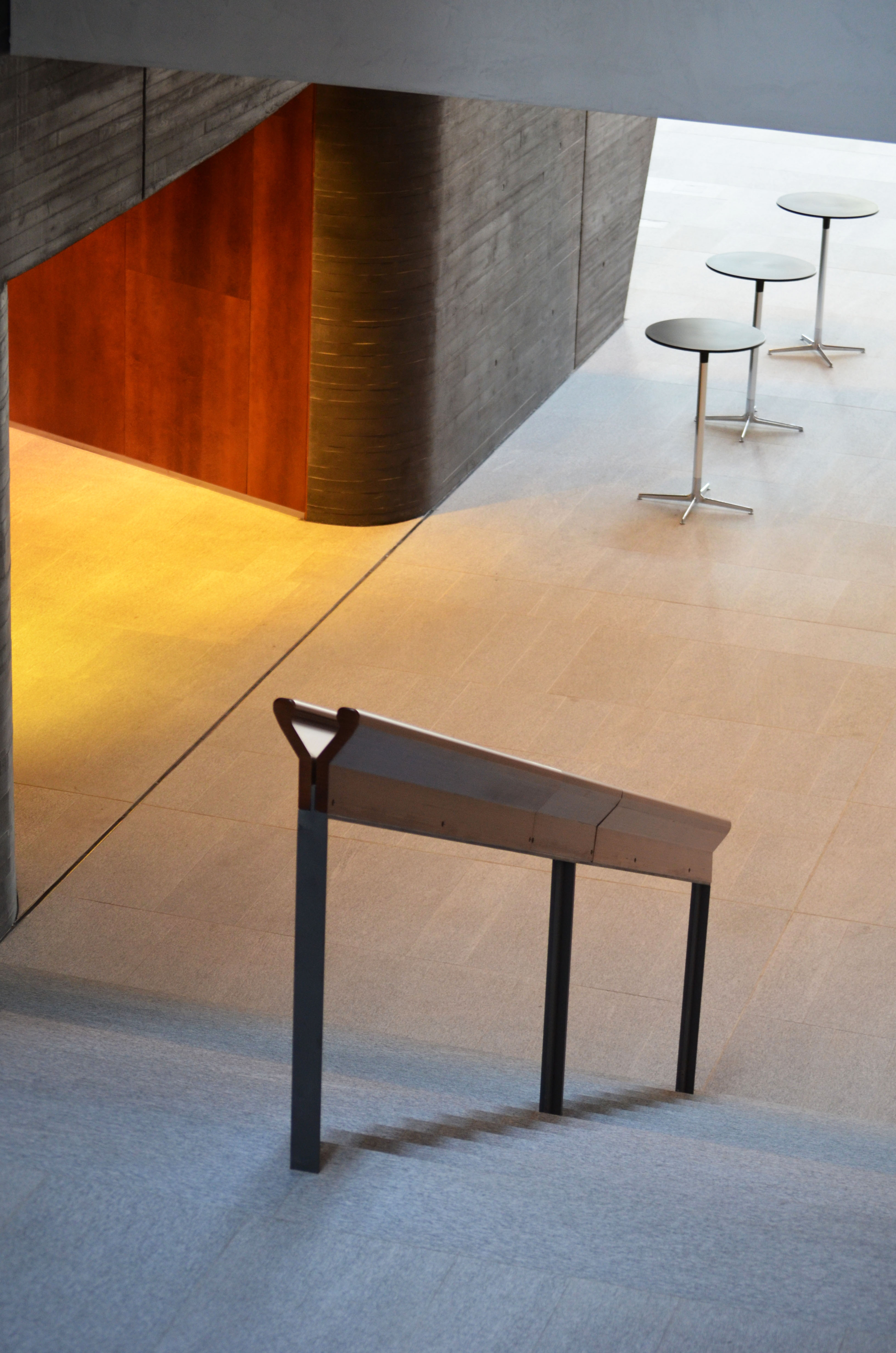
Another view of the atrium staircase

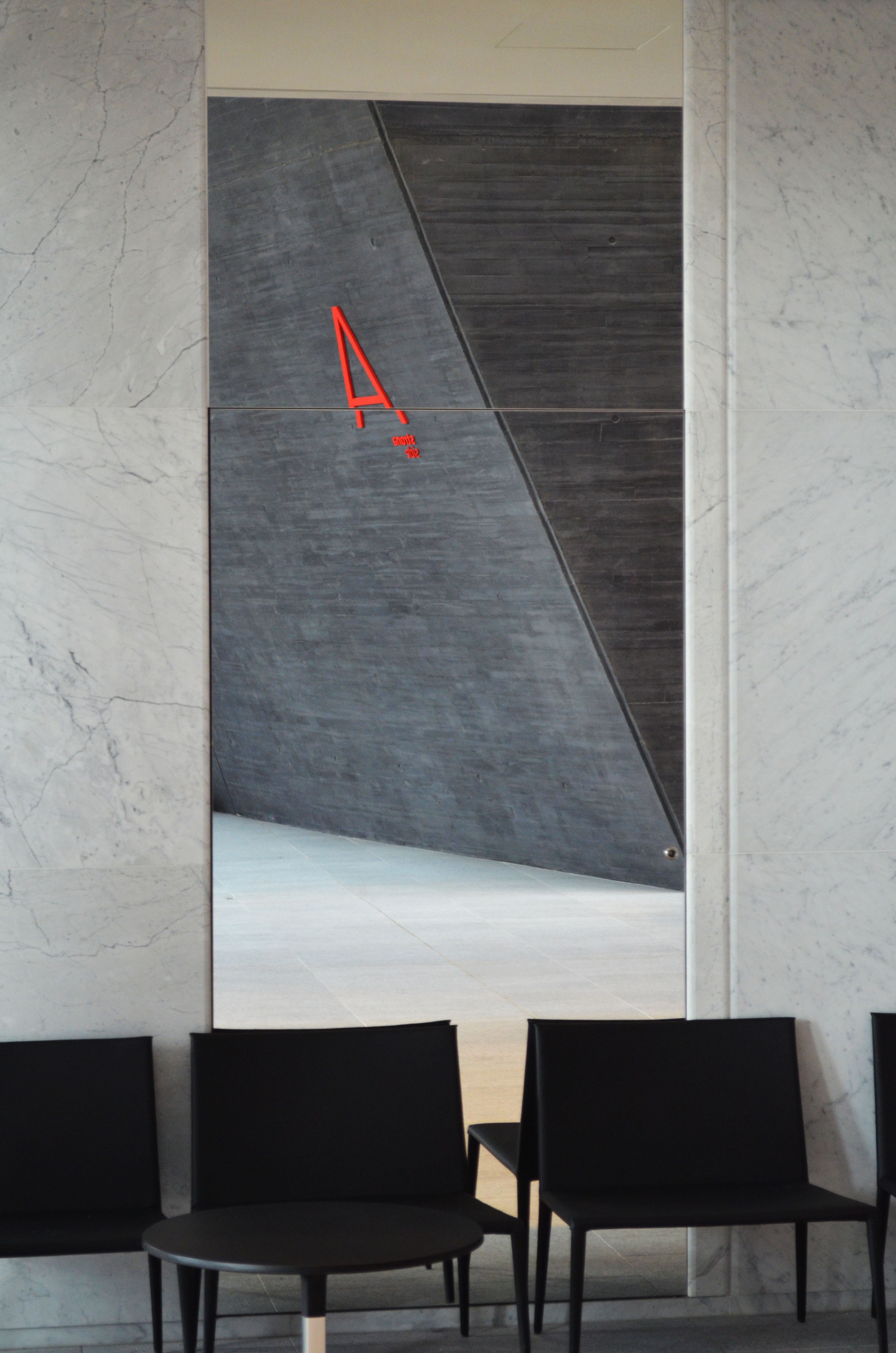
Atrium with a mirrored reflection of the Great Concert Hall wall

=== Acoustics ===
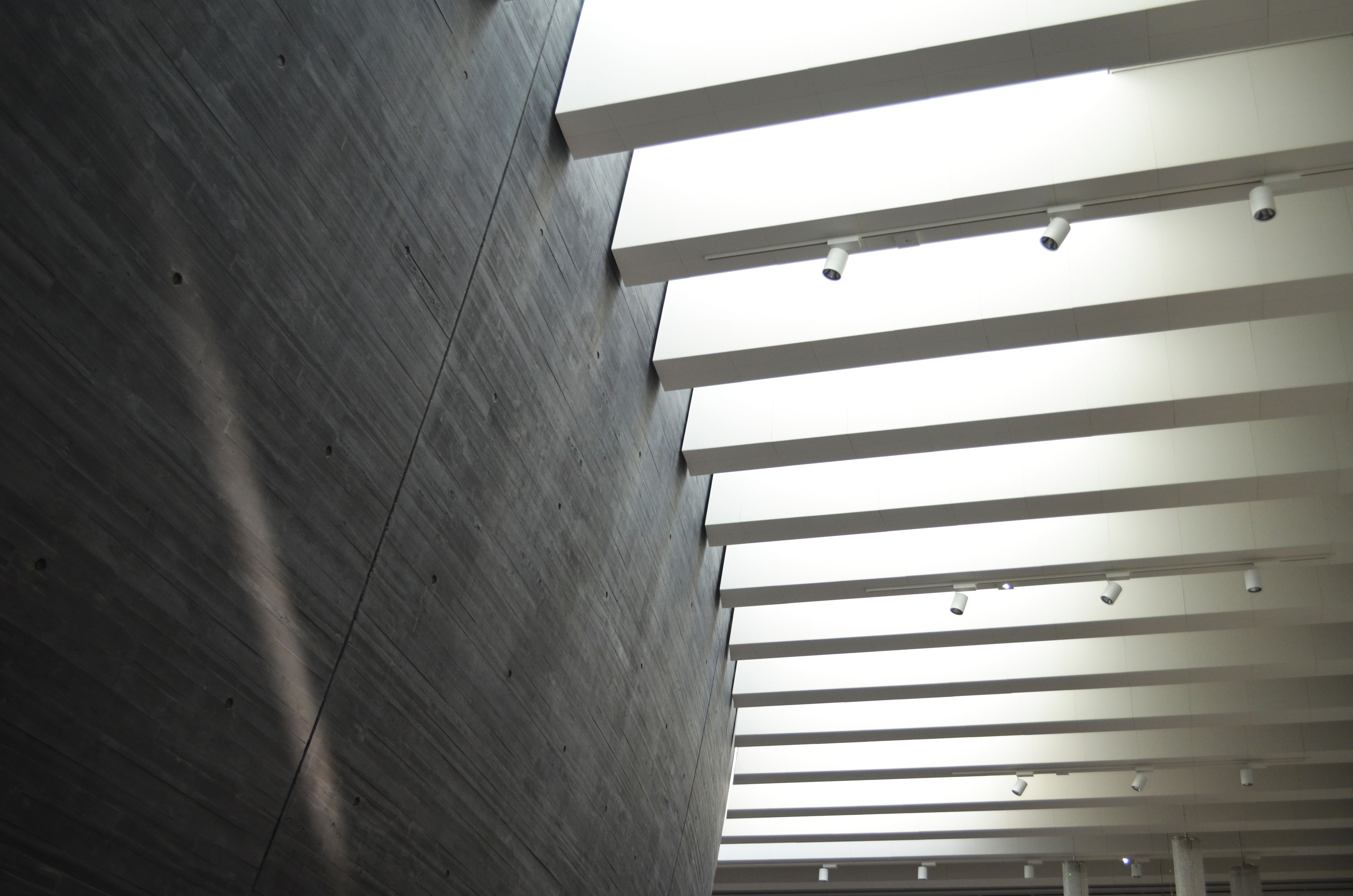
Acoustically designed exterior wall of the Great Concert Hall

The building features acoustics and soundproofing, allowing simultaneous recordings in both halls. Dressing rooms are acoustically tailored to different instrument groups. The Great Concert Hall, a standalone structure within the brick building, is built with thick black concrete walls to block external noise.

Acoustics were developed by Wrocław-based Pracownia Akustyczna Kozłowski from the post-competition concept stage, with Yasuhisa Toyota of Nagata Acoustics as the consultant for the Great Concert Hall's fixed acoustics. Toyota, which worked on halls like the Walt Disney Concert Hall in Los Angeles, Calderwood Performance Hall in Boston, and Danish Radio Concert Hall in Copenhagen, was involved due to Krystian Zimerman's advocacy.

Acoustic design utilized computer simulations and a 1:10 scale model built in Aleksandrów Łódzki, displayed in Katowice in June 2011. Calculations accounted for audience and material impacts with audibility and visibility tests for every seat. Reverberation is managed with curtains, aided by the stage canopy and undulating concrete walls. Sound insulation used 8,000 m² of mineral wool for floors, roofs, and external walls.

== Surroundings ==
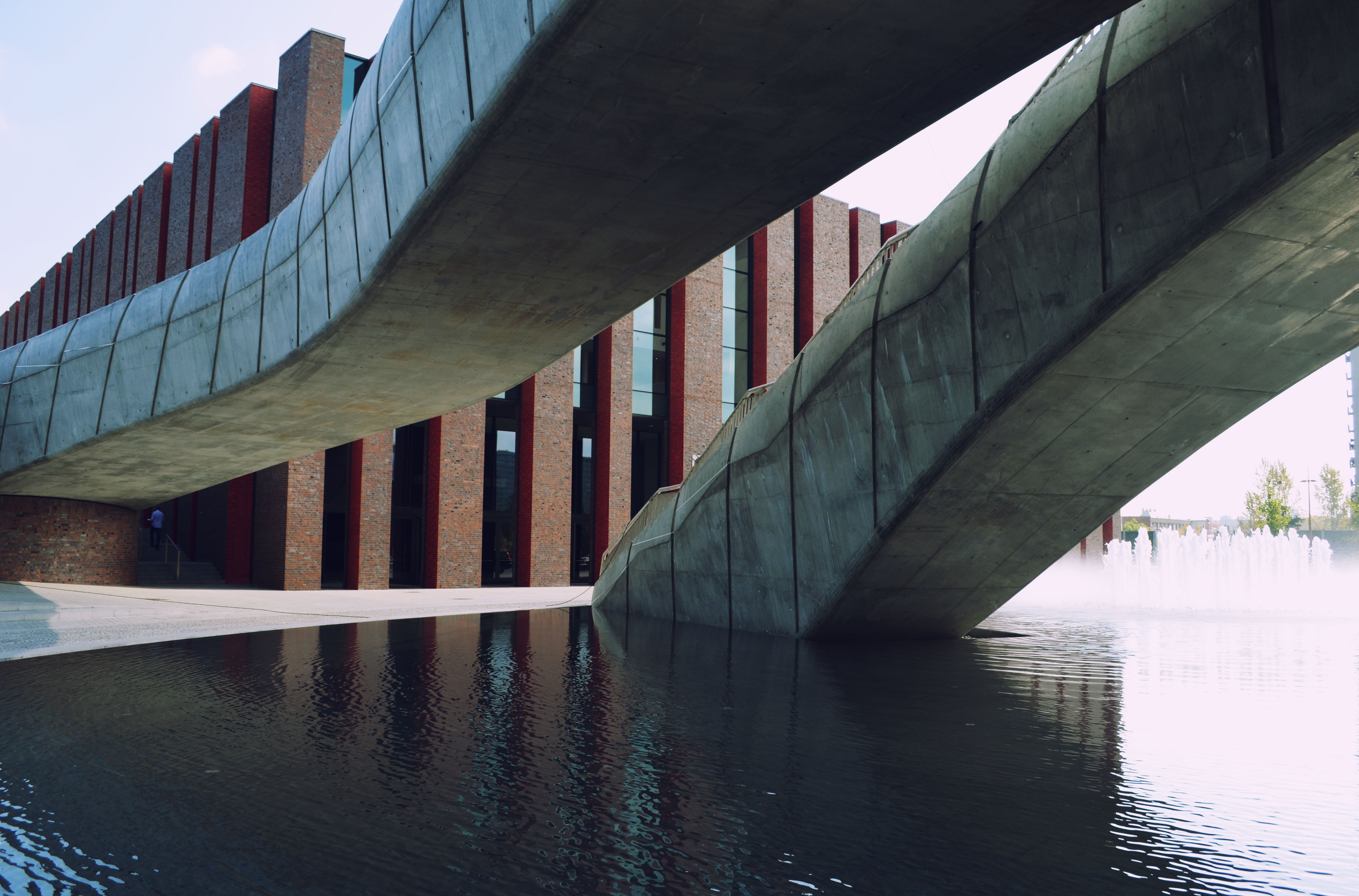
Wojciech Kilar Square with its fountain

The site spans 40,000 m², with the building positioned in one corner to create distinct functional zones: an entrance square, the building, and a sensory garden with a fountain, sound toys, and an amphitheatre.

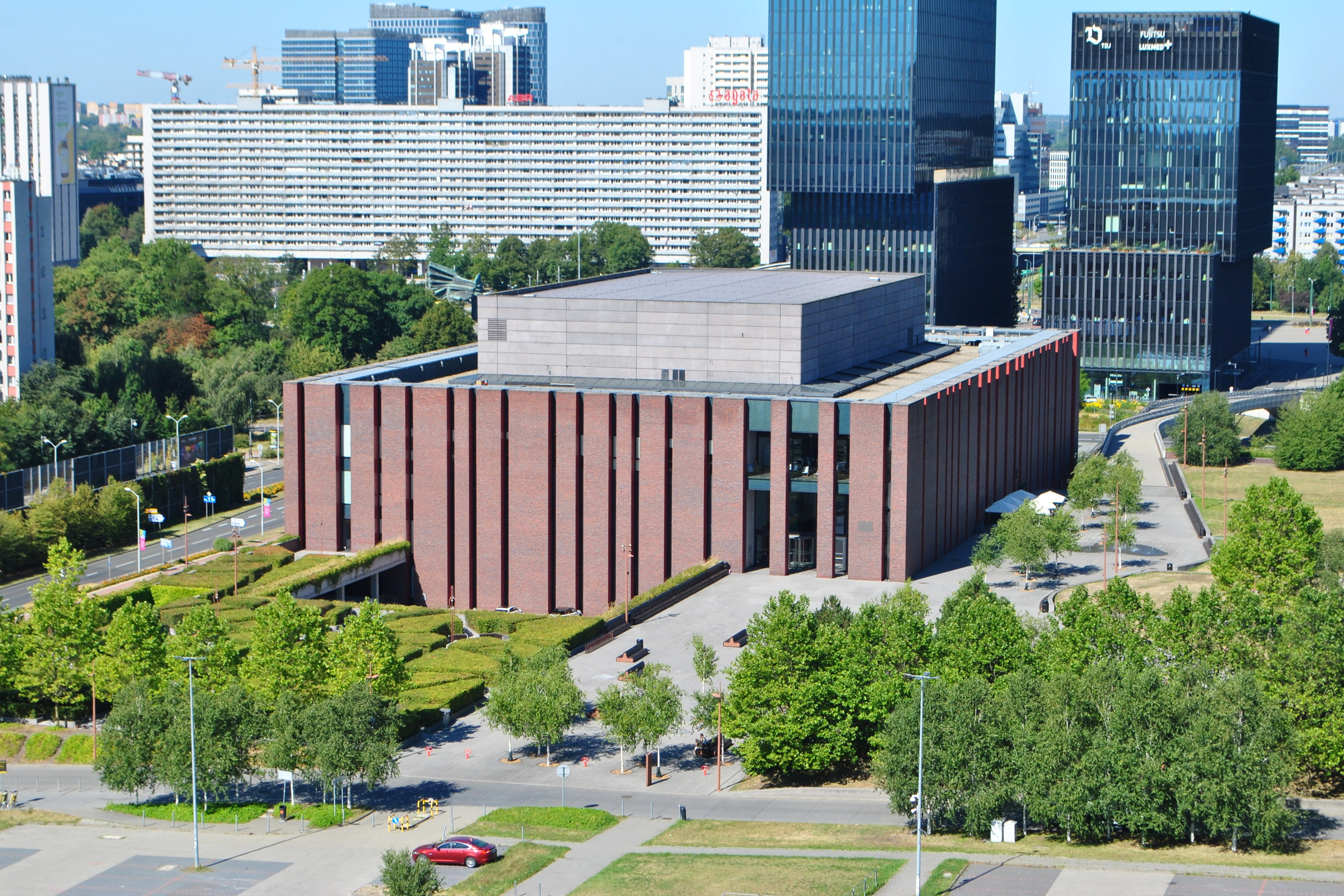
Building viewed from the Silesian Museum's observation tower, with the 1926 Katowice layout garden-labyrinth in the foreground

The entrance square, named after Wojciech Kilar, features tree clusters and a large elliptical fountain, 9 cm deep with a 65 cm basin, made of Padang Dark granite blocks and slabs, equipped with nozzles and lighting. The eastern square's fountain covers 94.7 m², with a reinforced concrete basin, pavement tiles, nozzles, and lighting.

Another feature is a plant labyrinth replicating Katowice's 1926 urban layout, using hornbeam saplings suggested by Krzysztof Penderecki. The surrounding park includes about 100 trees – plane trees, Himalayan birches, and wild cherries – with plane trees framing the cherries and birches, the former echoing the facade's brick colour. An Austrian pine grows on the amphitheatre mound. Underground irrigation, fertilization, and aeration system supports the trees, with no shrubs or flowerbeds to maintain a minimalist lawn.

== Awards and recognitions ==
- Five Star Award, European Commercial Property Awards, Public Service category (2010).
- Nomination for the European Union Prize for Contemporary Architecture (2014).
- Nomination for the Polska Architektura XXL Award (2014).
- Finalist in the Życie w Architekturze competition (2015).
- Ministry of Culture and National Heritage Award for the best cultural architectural project (2014).
- Polityka magazine Public Award for Best Architectural Object (2014).
- Top Municipal Investments Award by PTWP Group (2015).
- Nomination for the SARP Award of the Year (2014).
- Main Prize in the Polska Pięknieje – 7 Wonders of European Funds competition (2015).
- Polish Urbanists Society Award for the best public space development (2015).
- AMS and Polish Urbanists Society Award for Best Public Space Changes, marking 25 years of transformation.

== Bibliography ==
- Broniewicz, Piotr (2021). Współczesna europejska architektura dla muzyki w przestrzeni miasta [Contemporary European Architecture for Music in Urban Spaces] (PDF) (in Polish). Kraków: Politechnika Krakowska im. Tadeusza Kościuszki.
- Grzegorek, Grzegorz; Bulsa, Michał; Witaszczyk, Beata (2016). Domy i gmachy Katowic. Tom II [Houses and Buildings of Katowice, Volume II] (in Polish). Katowice: Prasa i Książka. ISBN 978-83-63780-16-6.
