= Nikiszowiec =

- Workers' Estate in Katowice
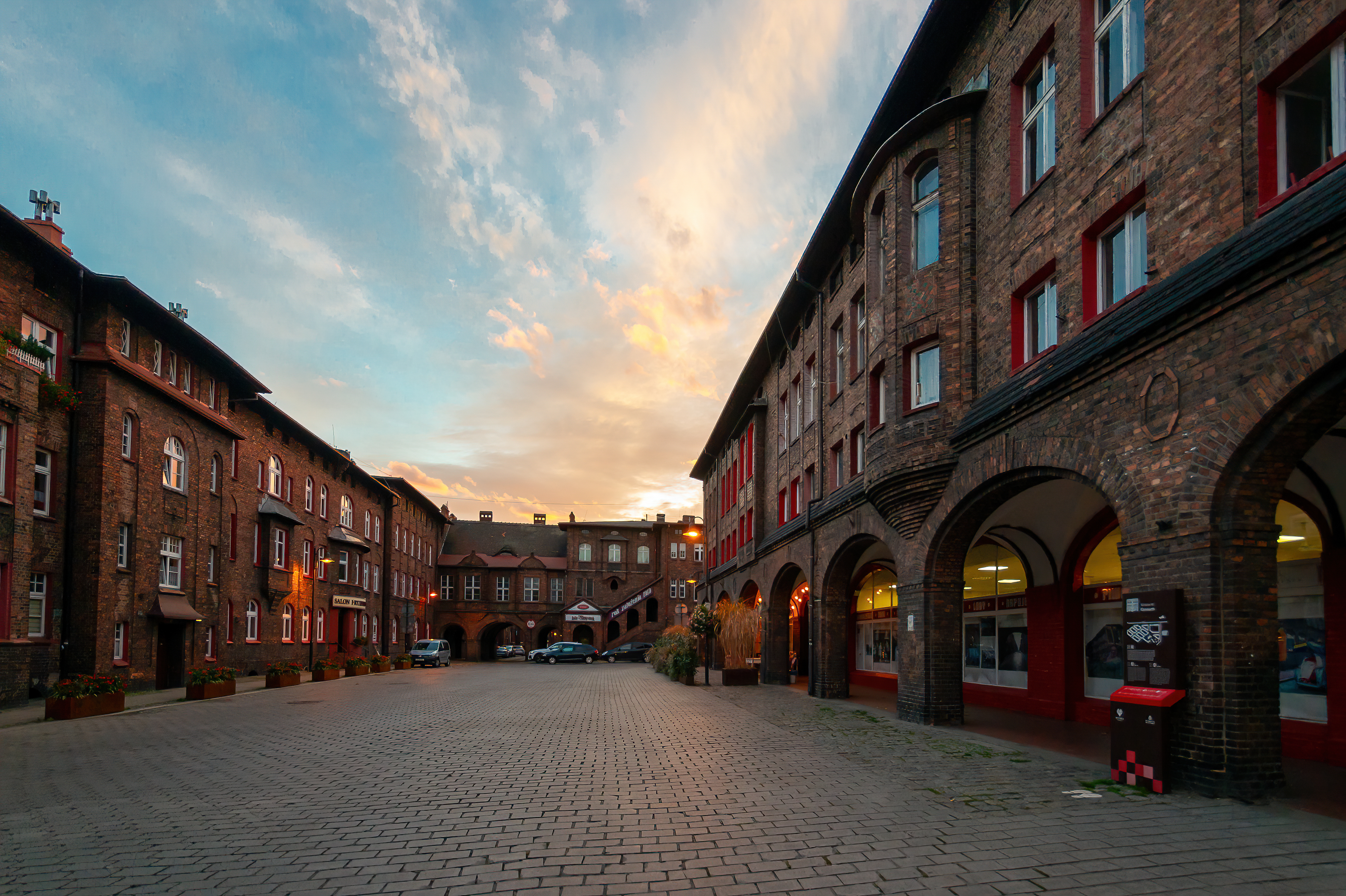

- Location within Poland
- Coordinates: 50°14′36″N 19°04′53″E
- Country: Poland
- Voivodeship: Silesian
- County/City: Katowice
- District: Janów-Nikiszowiec
- Time zone: UTC+1 (CET)
  - Summer (DST): UTC+2 (CEST)
- Vehicle registration: SK

Historic Monument of Poland
- Designated: 2011-01-14
- Reference no.: Dz. U. z 2011 r. Nr 20, poz. 101

Nikiszowiec is a well-known neighbourhood and settlement which is part of the Janów-Nikiszowiec administrative district of the city of Katowice.

== History ==
Initially it was the settlement of the Giesche coal mine built on the land of Gieschewald manor (Giszowiec) between 1908–1918 by the mining – metallurgical concern initiative Georg von Giesches Erben. On 9 May 1924, the manor was liquidated, and Nikiszowiec and Giszowiec were incorporated into the Janów district.

In 1947 the district became a part of Szopienice. In 1960, both Szopienice and Nikiszowiec were incorporated into Katowice.

The remnants of the original workers' housing estate familoks (specialized multi-family residences) comprise one of Poland's official national Historic Monuments (Pomnik historii), as designated January 28, 2011 and tracked by the National Heritage Board of Poland.

== Gallery ==
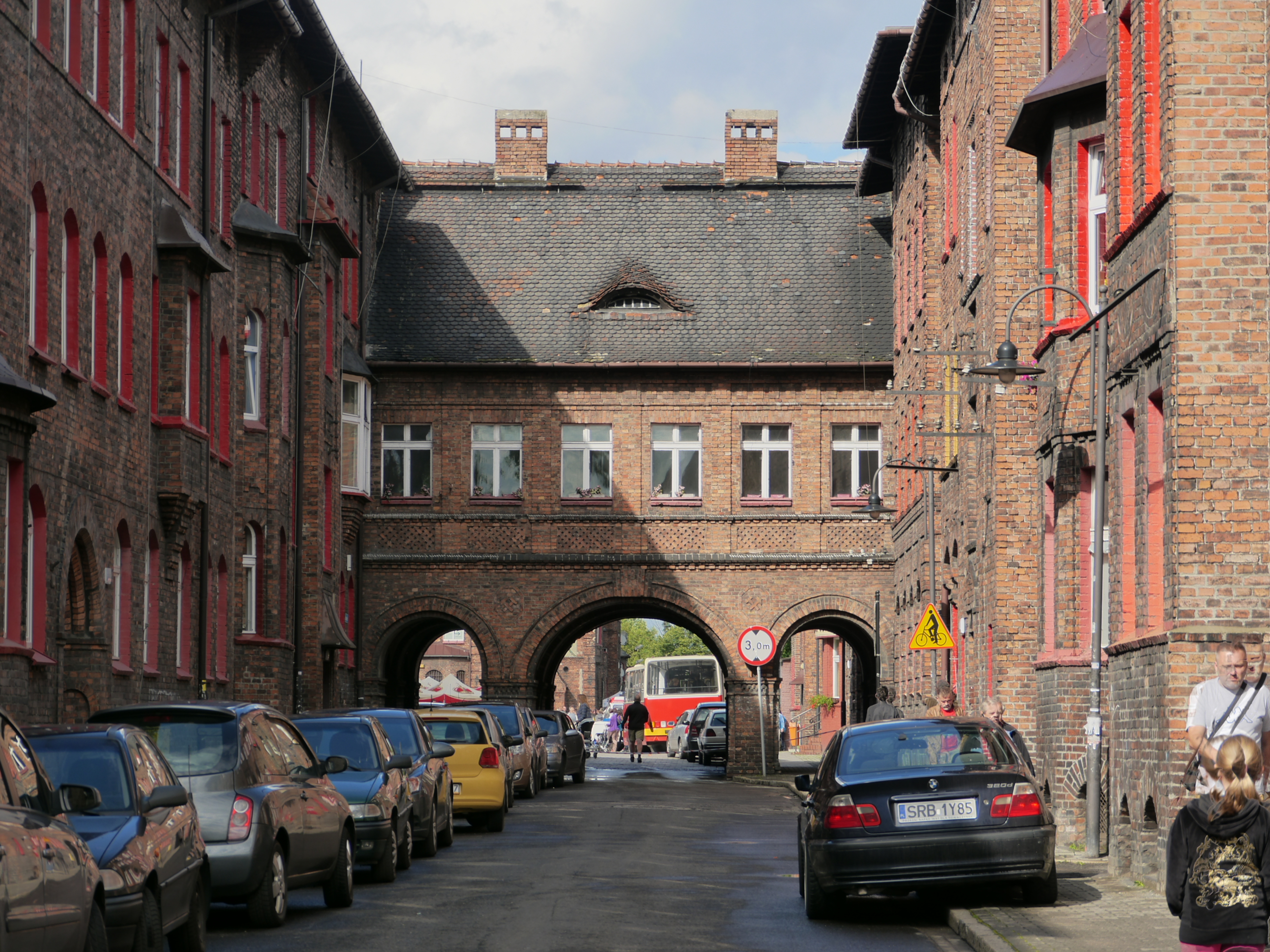
Historic familoks, 2014

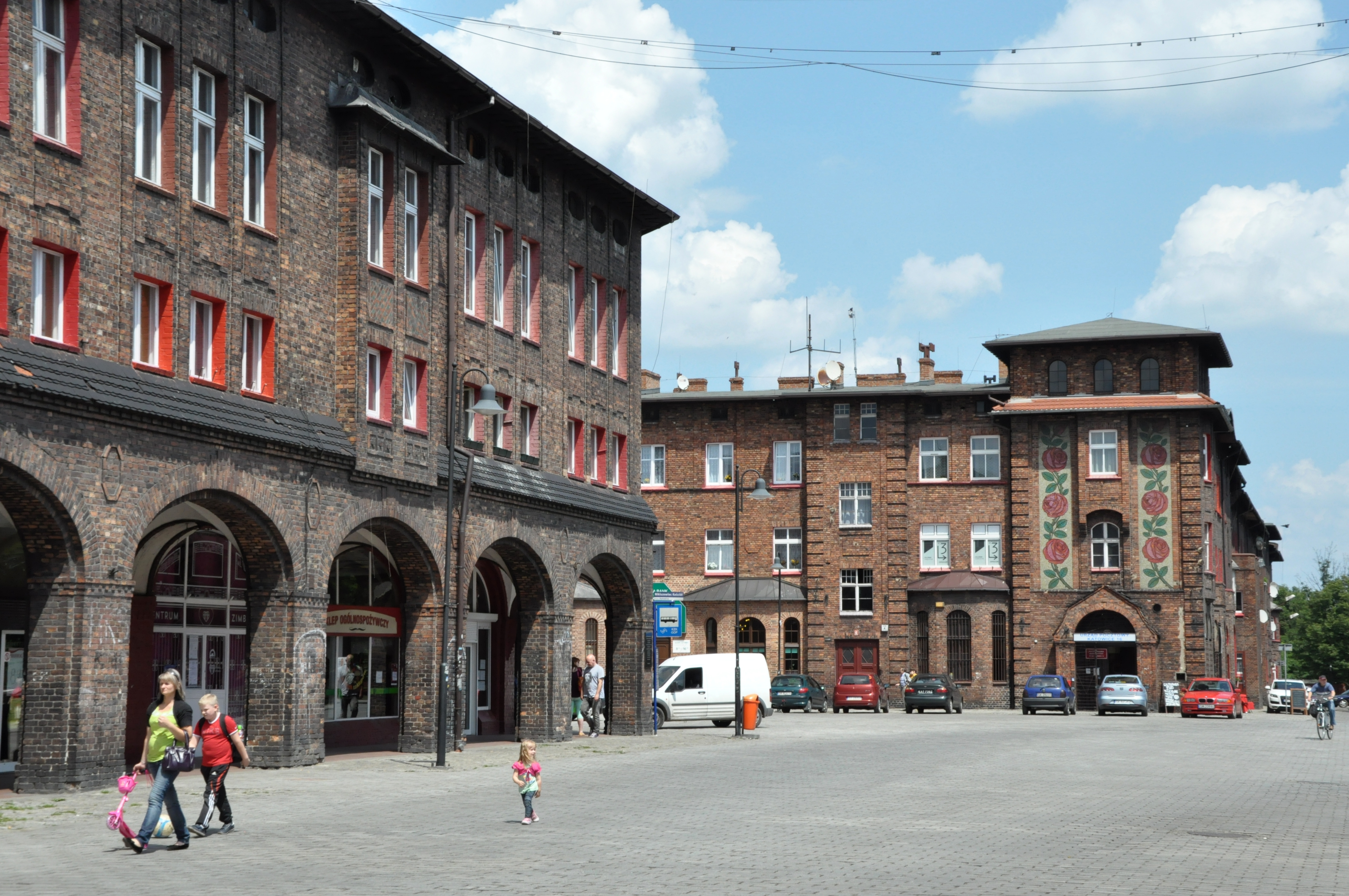
Post office, 2014

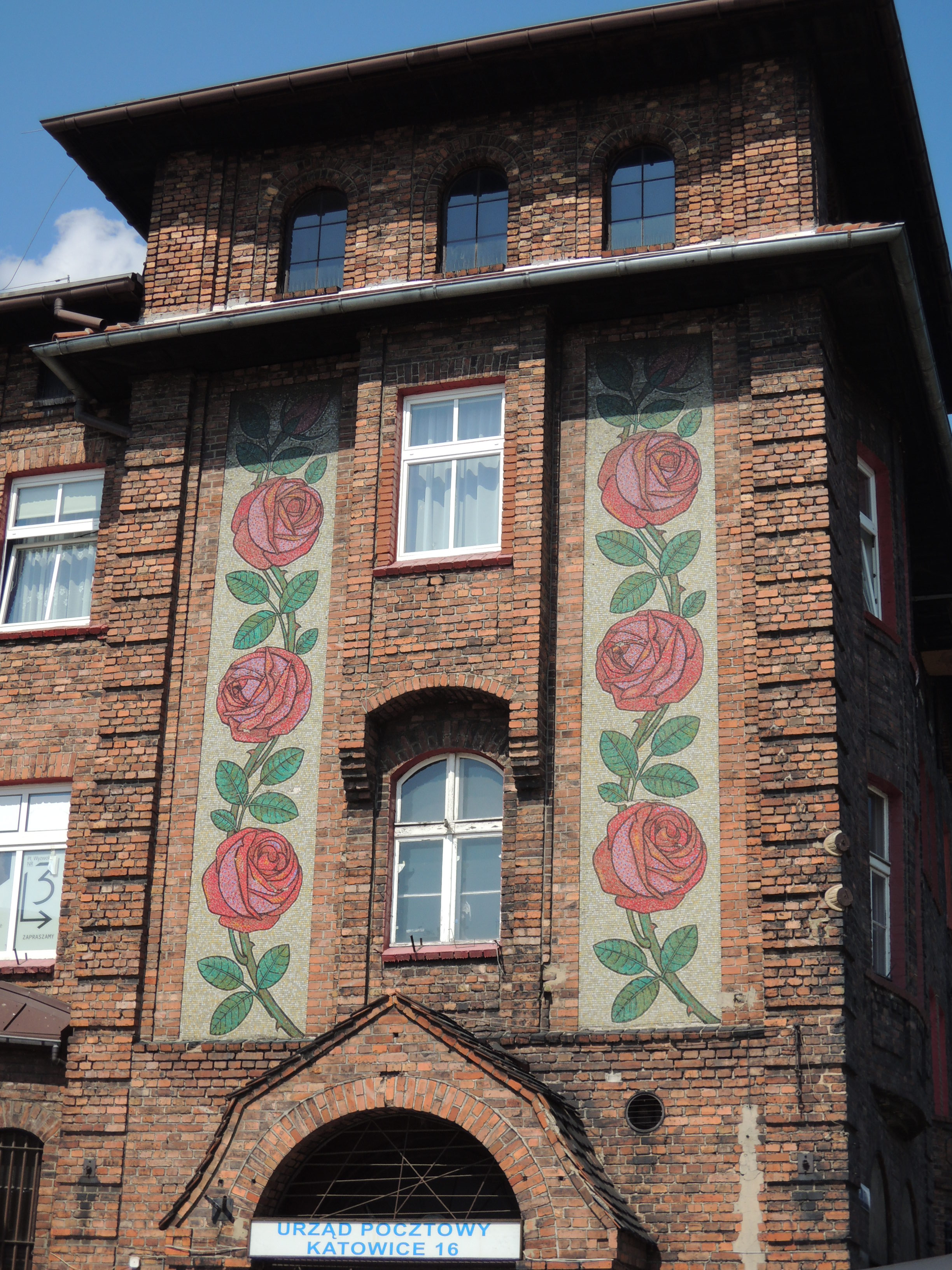
Historic building, 2015

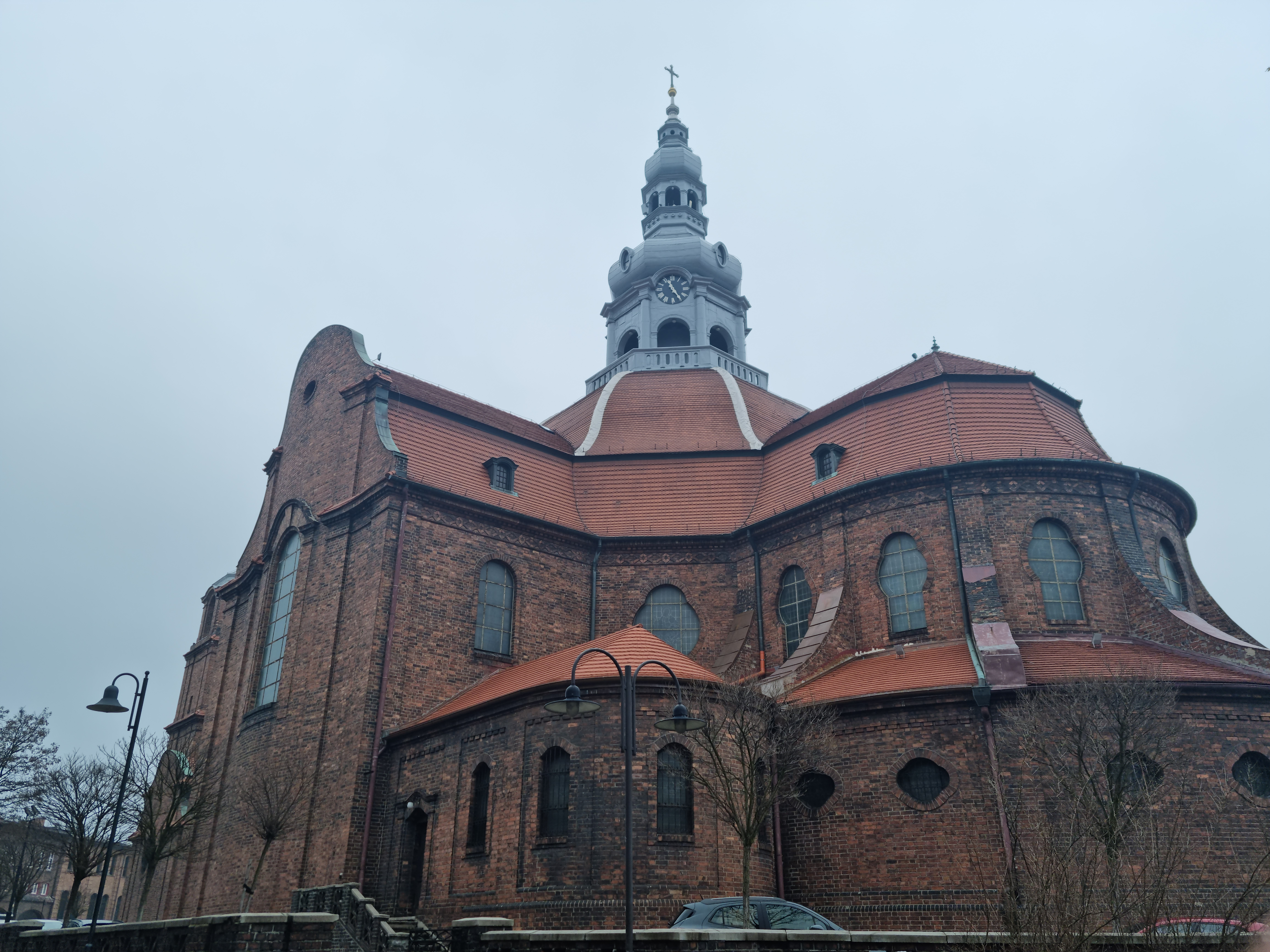
The Church of Saint Anne, 2023

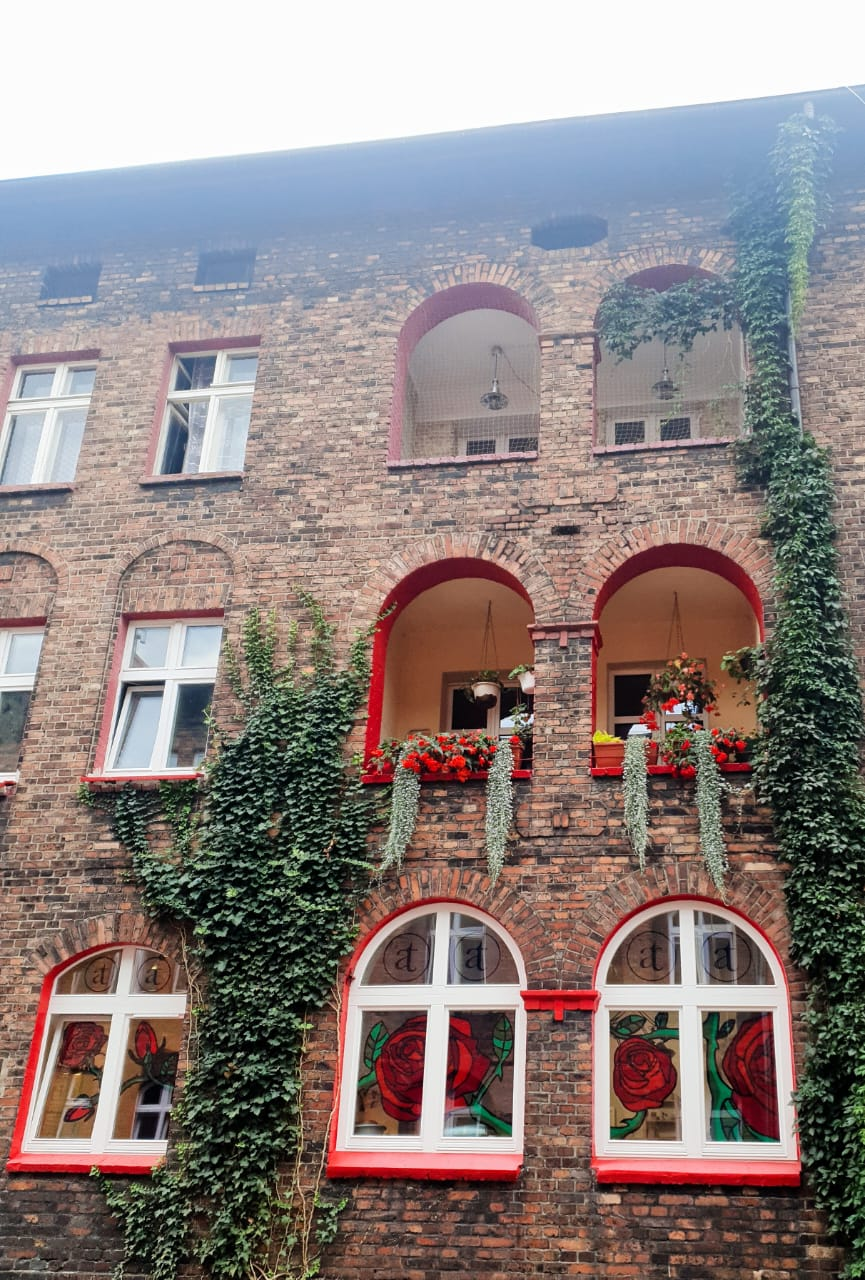
Barrio Minero Katowice, 2024

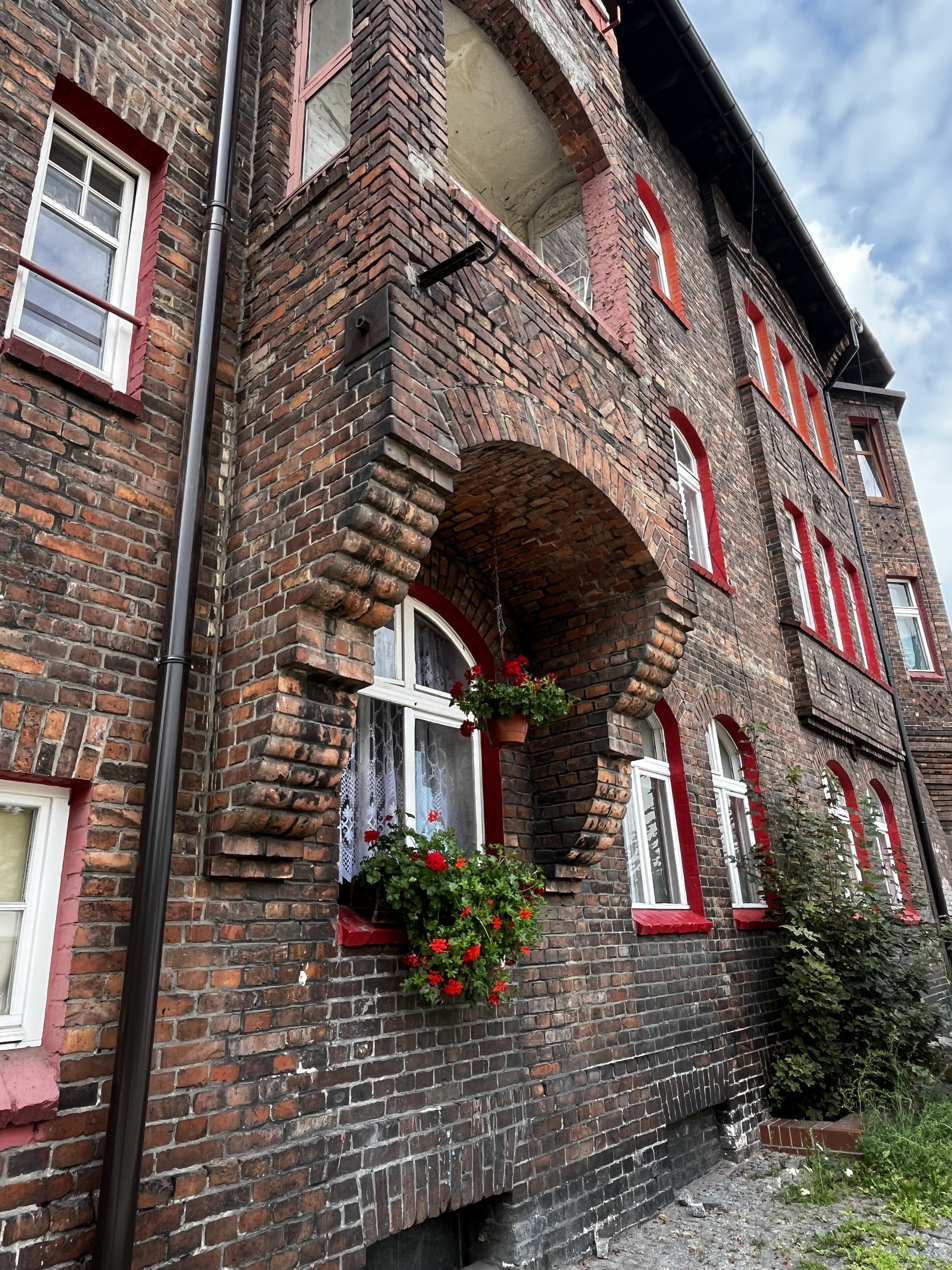
The distinct buildings, 2024

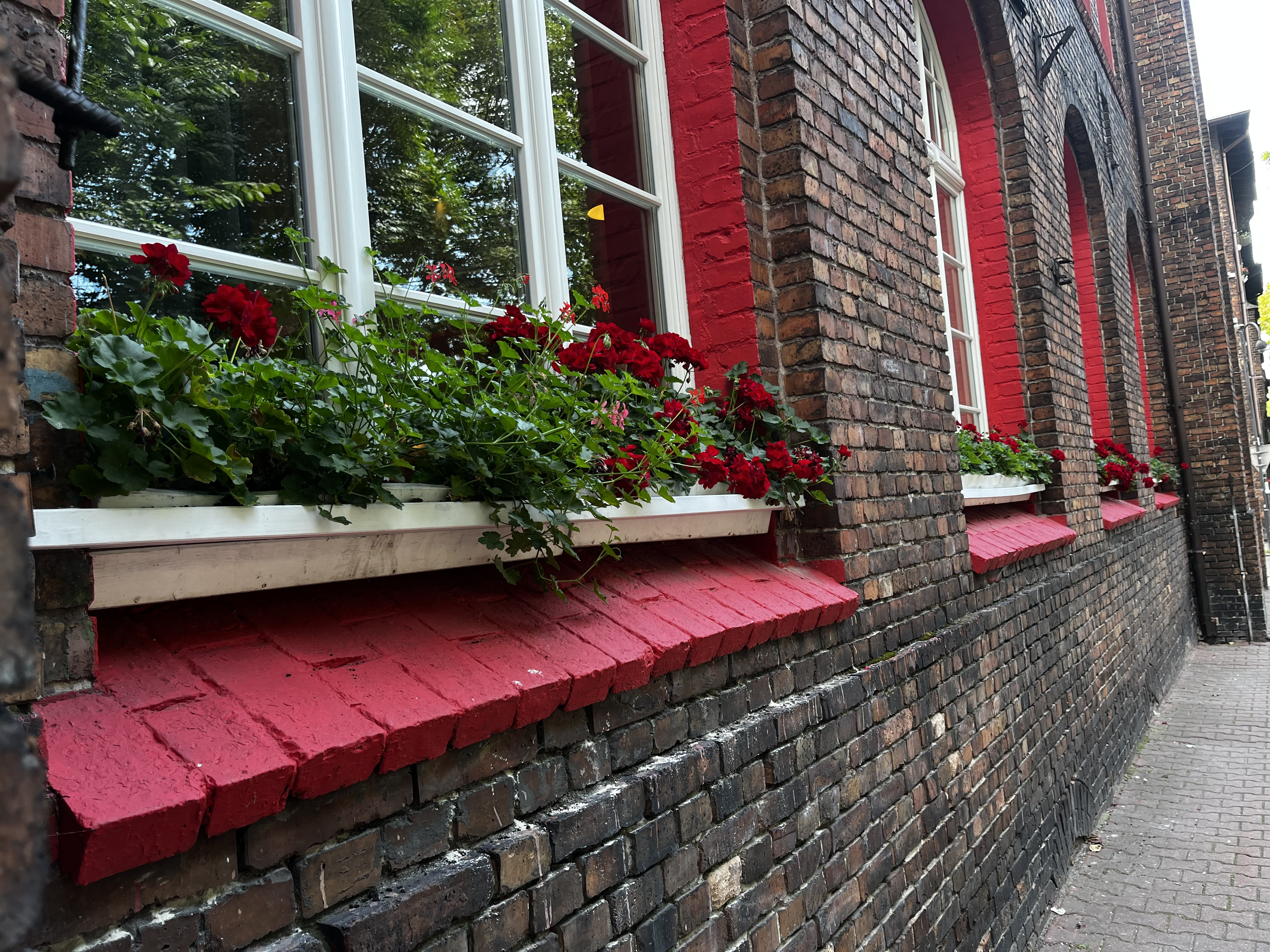
Beautiful window boxes of flowers are seen around to town, 2024

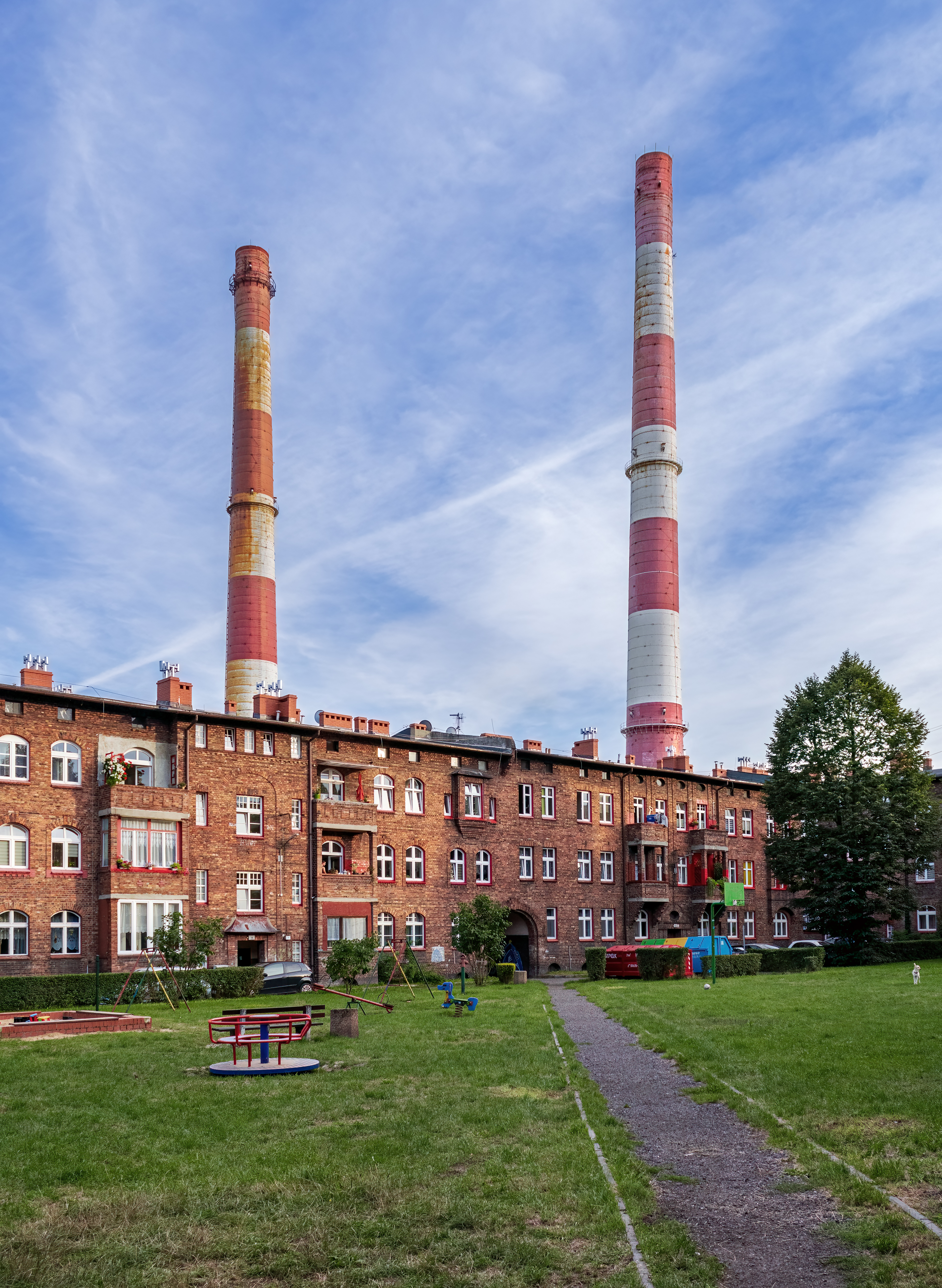
Courtyard with chimneys in the background, 2024

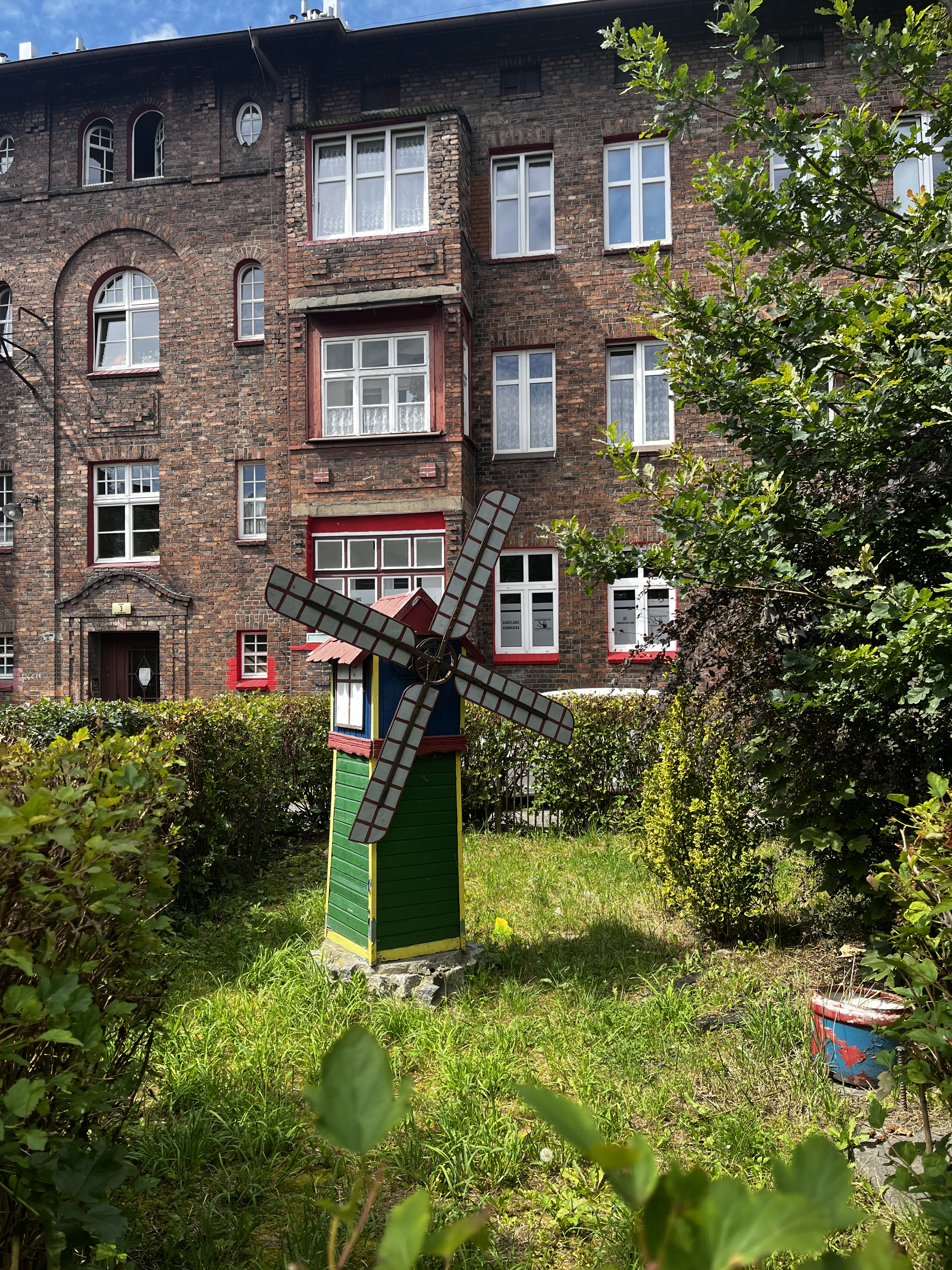
A courtyard garden, 2024

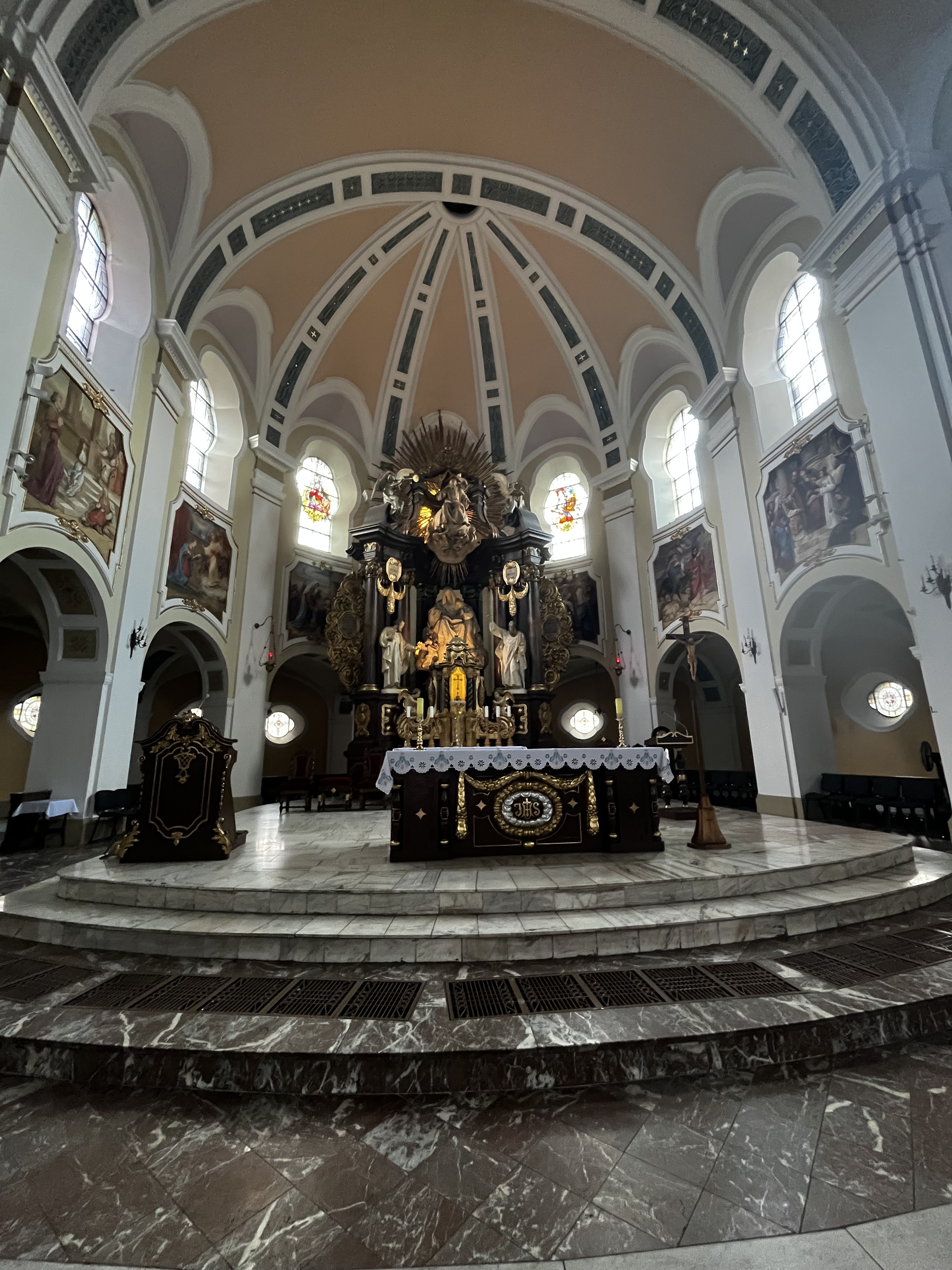
The front alter of the Church of Saint Anne, 2024

== See also ==
- Zgorzelec, Bytom
