= Kolonia Zgorzelec =

Kolonia Zgorzelec Zgorzelec
- Workers' Estate in Bytom
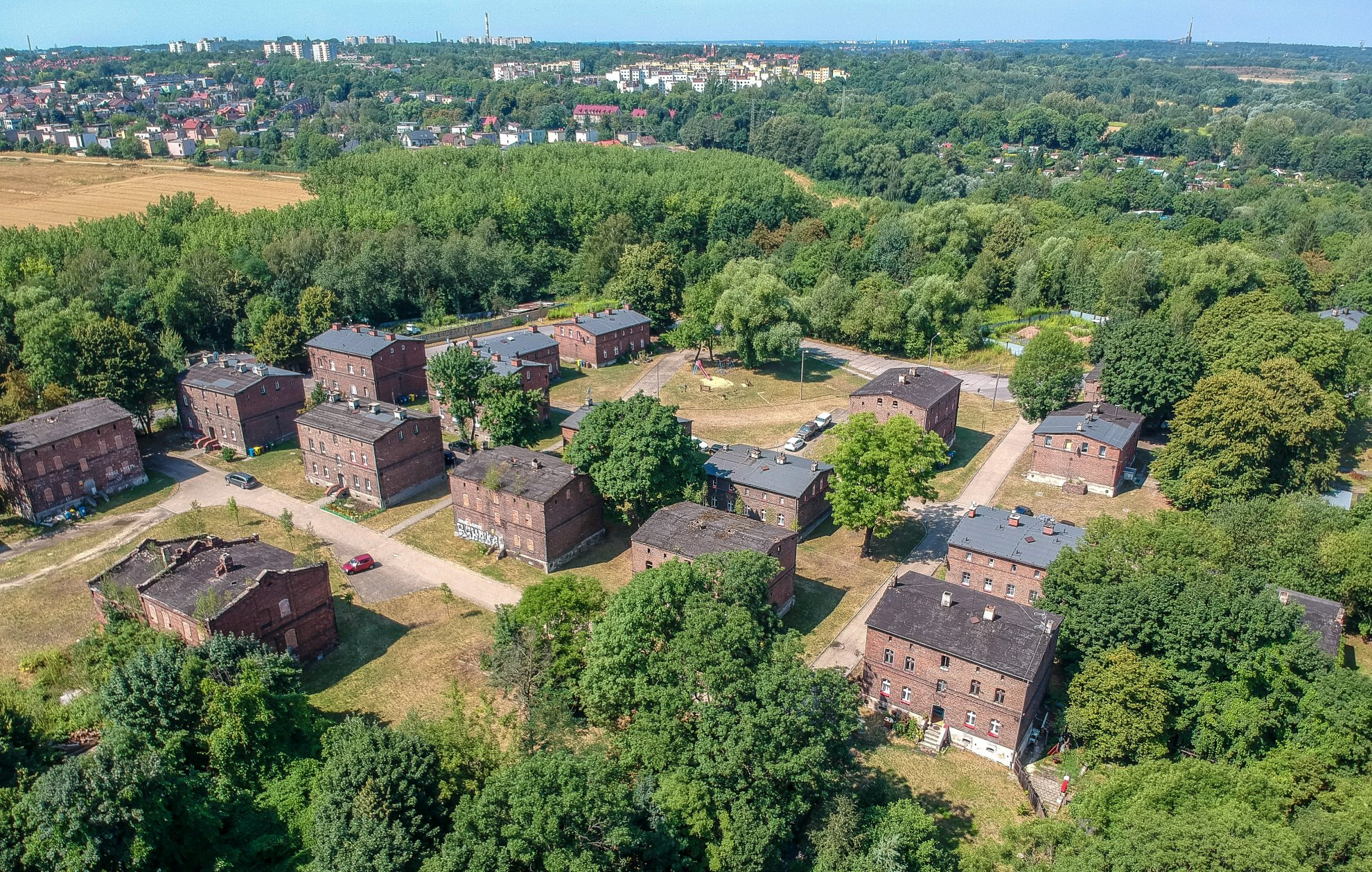
- Birds eye view of Zgorzelec, Bytom.
- Interactive map of Kolonia Zgorzelec
- Coordinates: 50.325°N 18.900°E
- Country: Poland
- Voivodeship: Silesian
- County/City: Bytom
- District: Łagiewniki

Area
  - Total: 0.07 km^{2} (0.027 sq mi)

Population
  - Total: 152
- Time zone: UTC+1 (CET)
  - Summer (DST): UTC+2 (CEST)
- Postal code: 41-909

Kolonia Zgorzelec (or simply Zgorzelec, German: Skorzeletz) is a workers' settlement (Polish: kolonia robotnicza) in Bytom, Poland.

Zgorzelec is composed of 34 familok buildings and is registered on Poland's Registry of Objects of Cultural Heritage (Polish: Rejestr zabytków) from 1994. The settlement is located in south-western Łagiewniki, Bytom and is bordered by Szombierki (a district of Bytom) in the north, Ruda Śląska in the west and Świętochłowice in the south.

== History ==
Zgorzelec was built from 1897 to 1901 on the initiative of Hubert von Tiele-Winckler to accommodate workers from the nearby Hubertushütte (Polish: Huta Hubertus, from 1936 Huta Zygmunt) steel mill on the order of the Kattowitz Joint-Stock Company for Mining and Ironworks.

== Sources ==
- "Kolonia Zgorzelec (podobszar 19)". bytomodnowa.pl. Retrieved October 6, 2020.
- "Bytom: Kolonia Zgorzelec prawie jak na końcu świata". bytom.naszemiasto.pl. Retrieved October 6, 2020.
- "Kolonia Zgorzelec w Bytomiu: będzie rewitalizacja!". dziennikzachodni.pl. Retrieved October 6, 2020.
