= European Concert Hall Organisation =

Founded in 1991, The European Concert Hall Organisation (ECHO) is a European cultural network that unites and empowers 23 premier venues across 14 European countries, specializing in delivering exceptional live music experiences and cherishing the classical repertoire. ECHO member halls believe in the transformative power of music to enrich the lives of the communities they serve.

By supporting its members at all management levels with resources, professional development, projects, and advocacy, ECHO is considered to strengthen their members' ability to deliver high-quality live music experiences, champion cultural participation, and promote diversity, inclusion, and sustainability in the arts.

== Activities ==
ECHO promotes artistic excellence, cultural participation, sustainability, and diversity within the performing arts sector by providing professional development for concert hall management, coordinating joint artistic programming, commissioning new music, and supporting audience development initiatives.

=== Professional Development ===
As part of its core mission, ECHO promotes meetings for diverse professional groups. These gatherings facilitate the exchange of best practices, collaborative capacity-building initiatives, and the development of joint projects. They also stimulate discussions aimed at enhancing collective capabilities to address the key challenges of the sector.

In addition to the foundational group of general directors, the working groups include Education, Learning and Participation (ELP), the artistic platform, communication&marketing, sustainability, Equity, Diversity&Inclusion (EDI), funding&sponsorship.

=== ECHO Rising Stars ===
The ECHO Rising Stars program identifies and supports exceptional emerging performers, hosting around 110 concerts and 70 special projects annually across ECHO halls. The Rising Stars mission is to inject fresh energy into the global stage, engage diverse audiences, and drive social progress.

Nominations are initiated by the artistic teams of the concert halls, who scout artists already established in their national careers and poised to benefit from increased exposure across Europe. The selection process is coordinated by the ECHO office and is the result of collective discussions during the annual meeting of the artistic teams.

Each of the 6 Rising Stars receives a bursary to commission a new piece, with at least 50% coming from female or gender-expansive composers as part of the Keychange pledge of which ECHO is part. Going beyond the stage, this initiative provides comprehensive growth through training opportunities. Sustainability is stated to be a priority, with efforts to minimize the ecological footprint of touring European ECHO halls.

Since its inception in 1995–96, the ECHO Rising Stars programme has supported over 150 exceptional artists. Past seasons have featured among others Patricia Kopatchinskaja, Jörg Widmann, Janine Jansen, Igor Levit, Renaud Capuçon, Khatia Buniatishvili, Benjamin Appl, Kian Soltani, Cuarteto Casals, Belcea Quartet, Modigliani Quartet.

=== Young Composers Scheme ===
Launched in 2024, the Young Composers Scheme commissions two early-career composers to create orchestral works to be rehearsed, performed, and shared across the ECHO network. The programme includes residencies, professional mentoring, and training opportunities.

In 2024–26 the programme, co-funded by the Ernst von Siemens Kunststiftung, supported Yiran Zhao and Igor C Silva.

=== Other Initiatives ===
ECHO has been involved in various international projects, including:

Classical Futures Europe, a five-year initiative co-funded by the Creative Europe programme, supporting over 450 artists and innovative audience engagement strategies.

Metavenues, exploring the role of digital technologies such as virtual reality and AI in the future of concert hall experiences.

La Maestra Academy, in partnership with Philharmonie de Paris and Paris Mozart Orchestra, focused on supporting women conductors.

== Sustainability ==
In 2024, ECHO was one of the first cultural networks to receive the SHIFT Eco-Certification for its environmental practices, including low-carbon travel, green procurement, and internal auditing.

== Equity, Diversity and Inclusion ==
The organisation is also a signatory of the Keychange Pledge, committing to gender-balanced programming and commissioning. In 2022, ECHO adopted a Diversity & Inclusion Manifesto to promote equitable access and representation across its member halls.

== Governance ==
ECHO is governed by a board composed of elected representatives from member venues. It maintains a small administrative office headquartered in Brussels.

== Members ==
As of July 2025, the following concert halls are members of the organisation:

- Amsterdam: Concertgebouw (Amsterdam)
- Athens: Megaron
- Baden-Baden: Festspielhaus Baden-Baden
- Barcelona: L'Auditori
- Barcelona: Palau de la Música Catalana
- Birmingham: B:Music
- Brussels: BOZAR
- Budapest: Müpa – Palace of Arts
- Cologne: Kölner Philharmonie
- Dortmund: Konzerthaus Dortmund
- Gateshead: The Glasshouse, Gateshead
- Hamburg: Elbphilharmonie
- Katowice: Polish National Radio Symphony Orchestra (Headquarters of the Polish National Radio Symphony Orchestra in Katowice)
- Lisbon: Calouste Gulbenkian Foundation
- London: Barbican Centre
- Lyon: Maurice Ravel Auditorium
- Luxembourg: Philharmonie Luxembourg
- Paris: Philharmonie de Paris
- Porto: Casa da Música
- Reykjavík: Harpa (concert hall)
- Stockholm: Konserthuset
- Vienna: Wiener Konzerthaus
- Vienna: Wiener Musikverein
