= Familok =

Multi-family building commonly found in Silesia

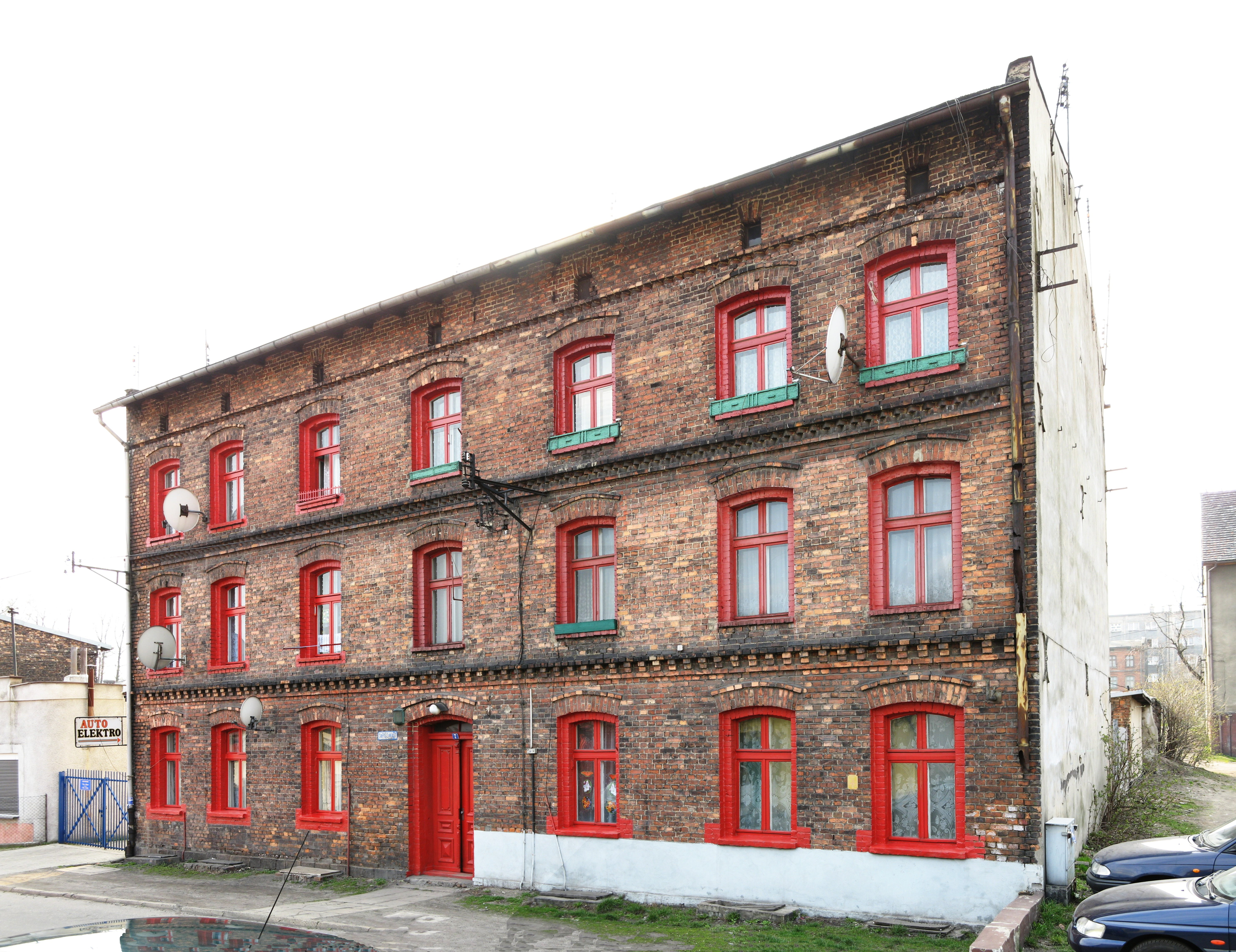
A familok house in Ruda Śląska

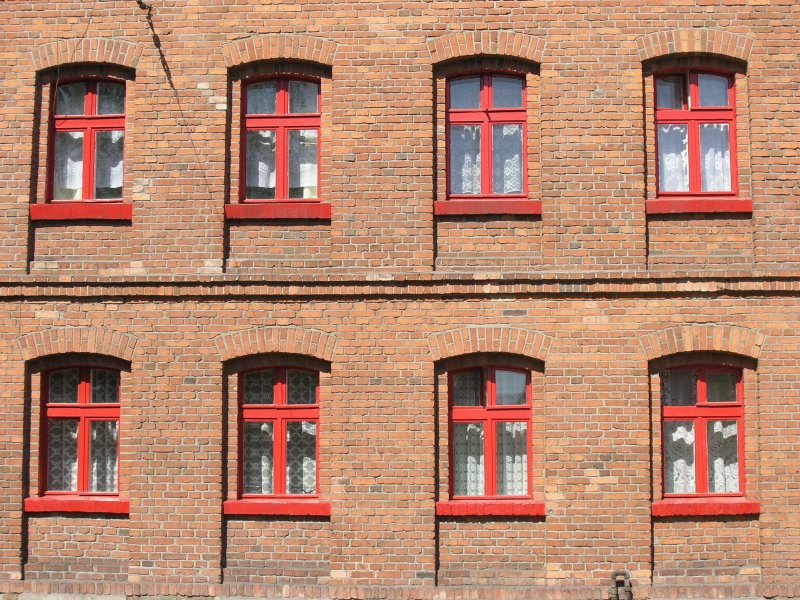
Red windowframes typical to familoks

A familok is a type of multi-family house, originally designed for workers of industries and their families, mainly coal miners. Familoks were built at the end of the 19th century and beginning of the 20th century, in the cities and towns of Upper Silesia. They are present in almost every sizeable Silesian city.

Today, they are often run-down and in crime-ridden neighborhoods. They were often built in complexes, resulting in "familok districts" in cities today. Some districts even had their own church and communal yards, acting as "cities within cities".

== Etymology ==
"Familok" is a Silesian way of pronouncing the original German name, Familien-Block (lit. family apartment house).

== History and culture ==
They were built during a time when mining and heavy industry were booming in Upper Silesia and homes were needed for workers arriving there from across Poland.

Historically, many residents of familoks, arriving to take city industry and mining jobs, came from rural villages. As a result, many familoks grew vegetables and had sheds for keeping animals in their attached yards. Historical familok life has been described as "a cross between country and town".

When many mines and foundries became unable to compete after the removal of communism, according to the Krakow Post, mass layoffs occurred. Most of the workers left the familoks. They are now occupied by poor youth and pensioners, and are poor districts of cities. Some cities have begun to renovate them.

The Silesian dialect of Polish is still commonly spoken in familok districts.

== Architecture ==
Familoks usually have two or three stories, and are made of red brick with red or green window frames. The red window frames and window ledges are that color because extraction companies, which often built familoks for their workers, tended to use red paint in their mines. Every familok district is different, depending on the depending on exactly why and by which company it was built.

== Protection ==
Many have been designated as historical monuments.

In several towns, they are protected by conservationists and renovated due to their historical significance. Protected familoks include those in Nikiszowiec of Katowice, Kolonia Zgorzelec in Bytom, Kolonia Emma in Radlin, Ruda Śląska, cities situated in Silesia, and those situated in Karviná District in the Moravian-Silesian Region of the Czech Republic in the historical region of Czech Silesia.
