= Szopienice-Burowiec =

- Katowice District
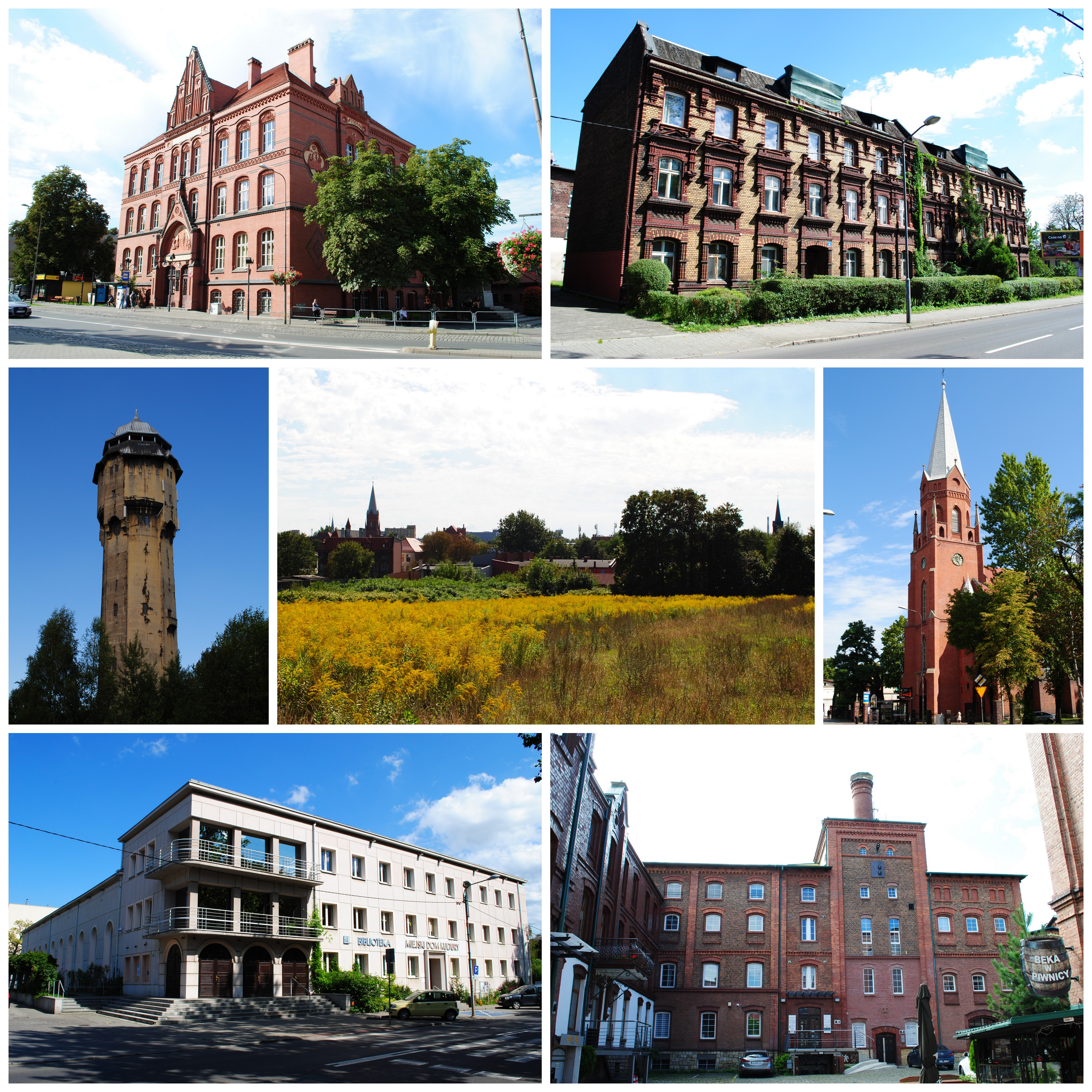
- Building of the Jan Długosz High School, tenements on J. Haller Street in Burowiec, water tower, panorama of Szopienice and Roździeń, Church of St. Hedwig of Silesia, headquarters of the Szopienice-Giszowiec Municipal House of Culture, buildings of the former Mokrski Brewery

- Location of Szopienice-Burowiec within Katowice
- Coordinates: 50°16′07.475″N 19°05′03.106″E
- Country: Poland
- Voivodeship: Silesian
- County/City: Katowice
- Established: 1 January 1992

Area
  - Total: 8.47 km^{2} (3.27 sq mi)

Population (2007)
  - Total: 17,139
  - Density: 2,020/km^{2} (5,240/sq mi)
- Time zone: UTC+1 (CET)
  - Summer (DST): UTC+2 (CEST)
- Area code: (+48) 032
- Vehicle registration: SK
- Primary airport: Katowice Airport

Szopienice-Burowiec (German: Schoppinitz-Burowietz) is a district of Katowice, Poland, located in the north-eastern part of the city. It has an area of 8.47 km^{2} and in 2007 had 17,139 inhabitants.

It lies along the Rawa river, approximately 8 km east of the city centre. The area of a district encompasses two historically important settlements: Burowiec and Szopienice, together with their associated colonies and settlements, including Bagno, Borki, Drugie Szopienice, Helgoland, Morawa, Roździeń, Paweł, Stawiska (northern part), Traugott, Uthyman, and Wilhelmina, as well as post-war residential estates such as Morawa and Przedwiośnie.

The earliest traces of settlement in the area date to the 13th century, when the villages of Roździeń and Szopienice were founded. Szopienice is first documented in records from 1360. At that time, both were agricultural communities. In Roździeń, a hammer mill was established, which from 1595 was owned by Walenty Roździeński. Burowiec emerged later, in the 18th century. From the first half of the 19th century, rapid industrial development transformed the area: coal mines, zinc and lead smelters were established, and the district was connected by both railway and tram lines. During the Third Silesian Uprising in 1921, Szopienice served as the headquarters of the Polish Military Organization of Upper Silesia. On 1 December 1930, Szopienice and Roździeń were merged to form Gmina Szopienice. This entity was granted town privileges on 1 January 1947. In 1951, among other places, Burowiec was incorporated into Szopienice. On 31 December 1959, the entire town of Szopienice was annexed to Katowice.

Shortly after the German invasion of Poland, which started World War II in September 1939, a unit of the German Einsatzgruppe I was stationed in Szopienice. It was responsible for many crimes against Poles committed in the nearby cities of Będzin, Dąbrowa Górnicza and Sosnowiec. During the subsequent German occupation, the occupiers also established and operated the E734 forced labour subcamp of the Stalag VIII-B/344 prisoner-of-war camp in Szopienice. The occupation ended in 1945.

Following the political changes after 1989, the Szopienice Non-Ferrous Metals Smelter was liquidated as part of industrial restructuring. Nevertheless, the district continues to function as an industrial centre. Two major transport routes run along its northern and southern boundaries: national road No. 79 and Expressway S86. The Warszawa Zachodnia-Katowice line also passes through the centre of Szopienice-Burowiec.

== Geography ==
=== Location ===
Administratively, Szopienice-Burowiec is one of the auxiliary units (No. 15) of the city of Katowice, located in the Silesian Voivodeship. It occupies the north-eastern part of the city, approximately 8 km from the city centre.

Szopienice-Burowiec borders several neighbouring districts of Katowice, as well as the cities of Sosnowiec and Mysłowice. To the north, it adjoins Dąbrówka Mała and Sosnowiec (districts: Milowice, Stary Sosnowiec, and Śródmieście); to the east, Mysłowice (districts: Piasek and Bończyk-Tuwima); to the south, Janów-Nikiszowiec; and to the west, Zawodzie. The boundaries of Szopienice-Burowiec are defined as follows:

- Northern boundary: follows Walenty Roździeński Avenue from the exit at the height of the Dąbrówka Mała Centrum Handlowe bus stop (southern platform) to the city border with Sosnowiec on the Brynica river; continues along the route of the former Jęzor Centralny JCA–Piekary Śląskie Szarlej railway to the intersection with Warszawa Zachodnia-Katowice line; then runs northeast to the Brynica river and follows the river to the tripoint of the borders of Katowice, Mysłowice, and Sosnowiec at the height of Szabelnia.
- Eastern boundary: follows the border between Katowice and Mysłowice through the middle of Hubertus III pond to the intersection of Wiosny Ludów and Stawiska streets; then continues south to Krakowska Street.
- Southern boundary: follows Krakowska Street and the southern carriageway of Bagienna Street to the junction with 1 Maja, Krakowska, and Obrońców Westerplatte streets.
- Western boundary: follows Obrońców Westerplatte Street to the Rawa river; then runs upstream along the river, encircles the Gigablok Sewage Treatment Plant, and continues through industrial and service areas toward Walenty Roździeński Avenue.

In Jerzy Kondracki's physico-geographical division of Poland, Szopienice-Burowiec lies within the Katowice Upland mesoregion (341.13), which constitutes the southern portion of the Silesian Upland and belongs to the Silesia-Kraków Upland subprovince. Historically, the district is situated in the eastern part of Upper Silesia.

=== Geology ===
Szopienice-Burowiec lies within the Upper Silesian Sinkhole, a region characterized by a horst structure. At the transition from the Devonian to the Carboniferous period, the Paleozoic basement of the Silesian Upland underwent subsidence, forming a basin that was subsequently filled during the Carboniferous with conglomerates, sandstones, and clay shales containing bituminous coal deposits. Carboniferous formations crop out at the surface in several parts of Szopienice-Burowiec. Larger exposures include areas along the border with Janów-Nikiszowiec, the Stawiska area, the site of the former Szopienice Non-Ferrous Metals Smelter at K. Woźniak Street, north of Wandy Street, and the zone between Janusz Korczak Street and the Morawa pond. These outcrops primarily consist of the Rudzki Beds, which comprise sandstones, grey shales, and conglomerates with coal seams. The area between J. Korczak Street and the Morawa pond also includes the Saddle Beds (bituminous coal, sandstones, grey shales, and conglomerates) as well as, together with the zone beneath the Borki pond, the Grodziec Beds (grey shales with sandstones and bituminous coal).

During the Pleistocene, the area was covered by ice sheets, most likely on two occasions: during the Mindel glaciation and the Riss glaciation. Deposits from the Riss glaciation, primarily till, are preserved mainly in the western part of Katowice. In the eastern part, including Szopienice-Burowiec, these tills were partly denudatiated during periglacial conditions, resulting in extensive surfaces of diluvial clays intermixed with fluvioglacial sands and gravels. Glacial and fluvioglacial sands and gravels cover substantial portions of Szopienice-Burowiec, while the Burowiec, Wilhelmina, and Bagno areas are underlain by eluvium derived from till.

In the Holocene, erosion of Pleistocene deposits continued, particularly within river valleys. This process led to the formation of low fluvial terraces at several levels through incision into the earlier accumulative covers. Holocene deposits in Szopienice-Burowiec are distributed mainly along the valleys of the Rawa and Brynica rivers.

=== Topography ===
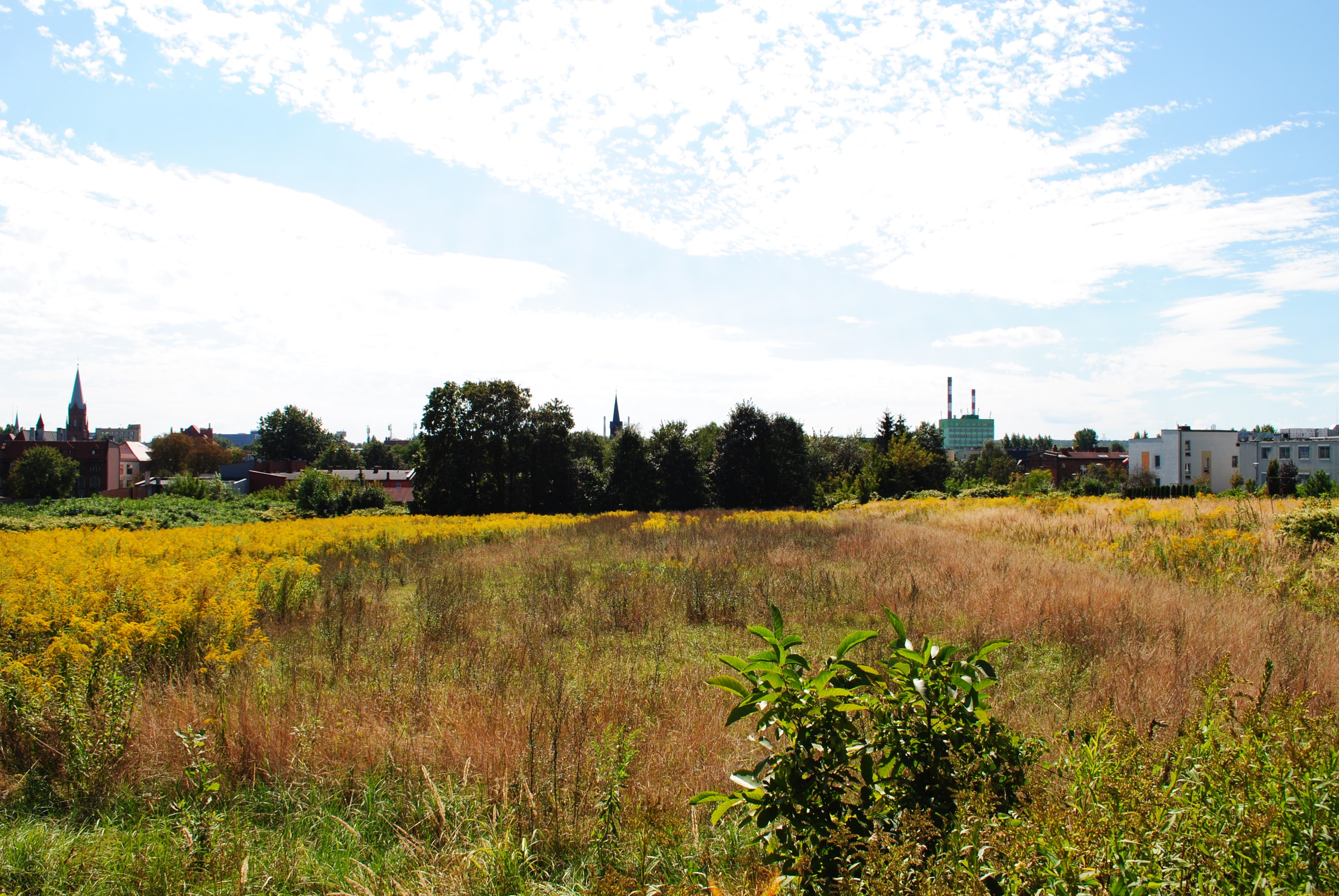
View from the Siemianowice Hills looking south toward the Rawa Depression (center of Szopienice and Roździeń)

Szopienice-Burowiec is located on the Silesian Upland, within the Katowice Upland mesoregion (341.13). The district exhibits relatively limited natural variation in terrain. The highest areas, reaching approximately 270 m above sea level, extends from the Evangelical cemetery through the water tower on J. Korczak Street, along Chłodna Street, to the housing estate near Letnia Street. The lowest point, at about 250 m above sea level, lies near the border between Katowice and Sosnowiec in the vicinity of the Borki pond. The overall elevation difference across the district is nearly 20 meters.

The western and southern parts of Szopienice-Burowiec belong to the Siemianowice Upland, which slopes gently downward toward the lower-lying zone along the Rawa river. This lower area represents a segment of the Rawa Depression. In the eastern part, around the Szopienice-Borki pond complex, the district falls within the Mysłowice Basin. Toward the south, along the boundary with Janów-Nikiszowiec, the terrain transitions into the Murcki Plateau.

Both the Siemianowice Upland sector and the Rawa Valley have undergone significant anthropogenic modification as a result of long-term settlement, as well as the extraction and processing of mineral resources, particularly bituminous coal. Additional human-induced landforms include road and railway embankments. Almost the entire district has been leveled through human activity, with only limited areas – mainly the elevations around the Evangelical cemetery, the water tower on J. Korczak Street, and the terrains between Burowiec and Borki – retaining largely natural relief. The Szopienice-Borki pond area constitutes a mining-induced subsidence basin.

=== Soils ===
In Szopienice-Burowiec, soils have been profoundly altered by intensive anthropogenic activity, resulting in the predominance of anthropogenic soils in which human influence represents the main soil-forming factor. In the northern part of the district, in the Burowiec area, soils have developed on tills. The southern part is underlain by sandy loams. Extensive urban development and industrial operations have led to significant degradation and devastation of these soils across large areas. Moreover, the soils are contaminated with heavy metals, including in wooded zones.

Soils of bonitation class IV predominate throughout much of the district. Areas of higher-quality class III soils are present in Burowiec, specifically in the terrains situated between Szronowa Street (along its full length) and Józef Haller Street.

=== Climate and topoclimate ===
The climate of Szopienice-Burowiec is broadly consistent with that of Katowice as a whole, though it is locally modified by topoclimatic factors. The region experiences a temperate climate, with oceanic air masses prevailing over continental ones. Western winds are dominant (accounting for approximately 60% of occurrences), followed by lesser contributions from eastern and southern directions. Between 1961 and 2005, the average annual air temperature recorded at the nearby Muchowiec station was 8.1 °C. The urban heat island effect further influences local temperatures. July is the warmest month, with an average of 17.8 °C, while January is the coldest, averaging –2.2 °C. Annual sunshine duration averaged 1,474 hours between 1966 and 2005, and mean annual precipitation totaled 713.8 mm between 1951 and 2005.

Topoclimatic conditions within the district vary according to the degree of afforestation, urbanization, and proximity to river valleys. The higher-lying zone extending from Burowiec to the housing estate near W. Anders Street falls within the topoclimate of built-up, elevated valleys, where conditions range from average to favorable. In densely built-up areas with extensive impervious surfaces, daytime heating is more rapid and nocturnal heat loss occurs more quickly due to lower humidity.

The low-lying areas directly within the valleys of the Rawa and Brynica rivers, as well as around the ponds, exhibit unfavorable topoclimatic conditions. These zones experience more frequent radiative cooling, leading to increased occurrence of fog and ground frosts. The remaining parts of the district display intermediate topoclimatic characteristics with average favorability, where reduced water availability partially offsets heat loss.

=== Hydrology ===
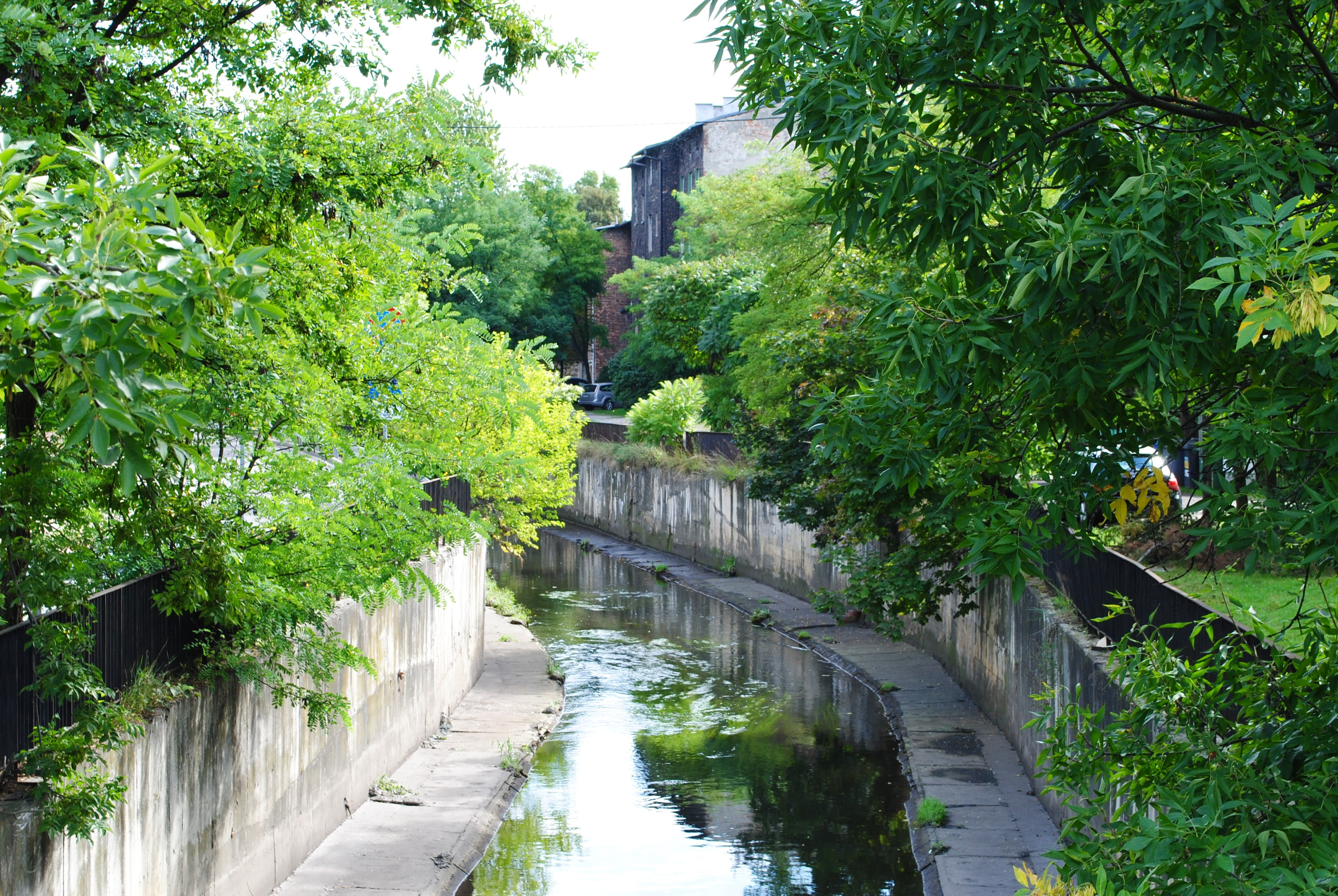
Rawa river at the height of Obrońców Westerplatte Street

The entire area of Szopienice-Burowiec lies within the Vistula river basin, specifically in the drainage basins of three rivers: the Brynica (draining the north-western part of Burowiec, including the Borki area and the Szopienice-Borki ponds), the Rawa (covering the western and central parts of the district), and the Bolina (encompassing the Wilhelmina and Stawiska areas). The Brynica river flows toward the border between Katowice and Mysłowice. In Szopienice-Burowiec, it forms part of the north-eastern boundary of the city over a portion of its course. In Szabelnia, the average flow rate with 50% probability is 18.6 m³/s.

The Rawa river flows from west to east through the district. It passes between the tram depot and the Gigablok Sewage Treatment Plant, then runs parallel to Obrońców Westerplatte Street, crosses it, and continues eastward parallel to Morawa Street and the Hubertus ponds toward the city boundary. Throughout its course in Szopienice-Burowiec, the Rawa is regulated and embanked. Its flow is fed mainly by rainwater, along with municipal and industrial wastewater. Both the Rawa and Brynica function as transit rivers at the level of the Szopienice-Borki ponds, with no hydraulic connection to surrounding waters. Their water quality is classified as class V (very poor), mainly due to high bacteriological pollution. Within the district, the Rawa receives wastewater at 15 discharge points, predominantly municipal. A small eastern portion of the district (parts of Wilhelmina and the Stawiska area) belongs to the Bolina drainage basin, although the Bolina river itself does not flow directly through Szopienice-Burowiec.

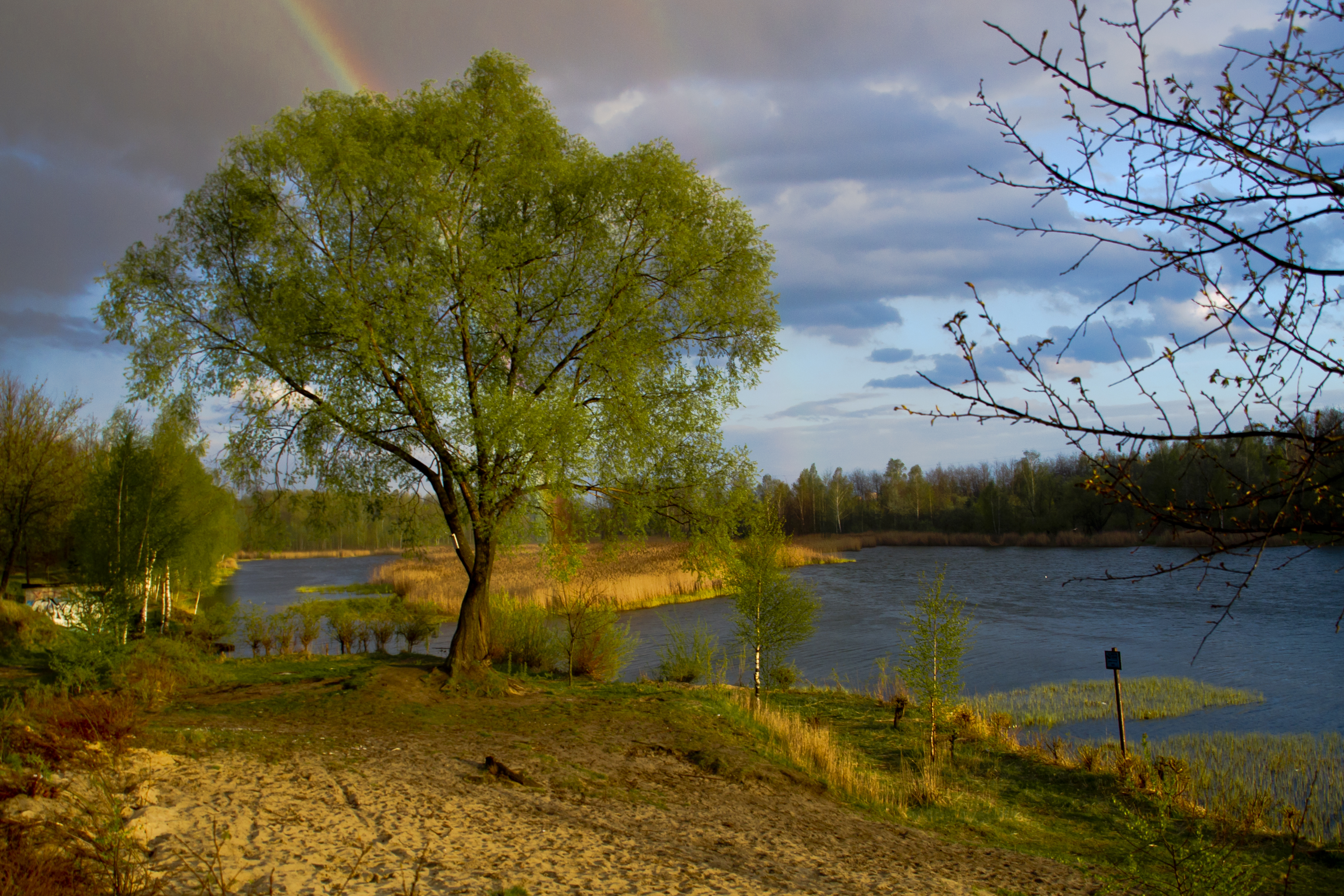
Borki pond in the Szopienice-Borki nature and landscape complex

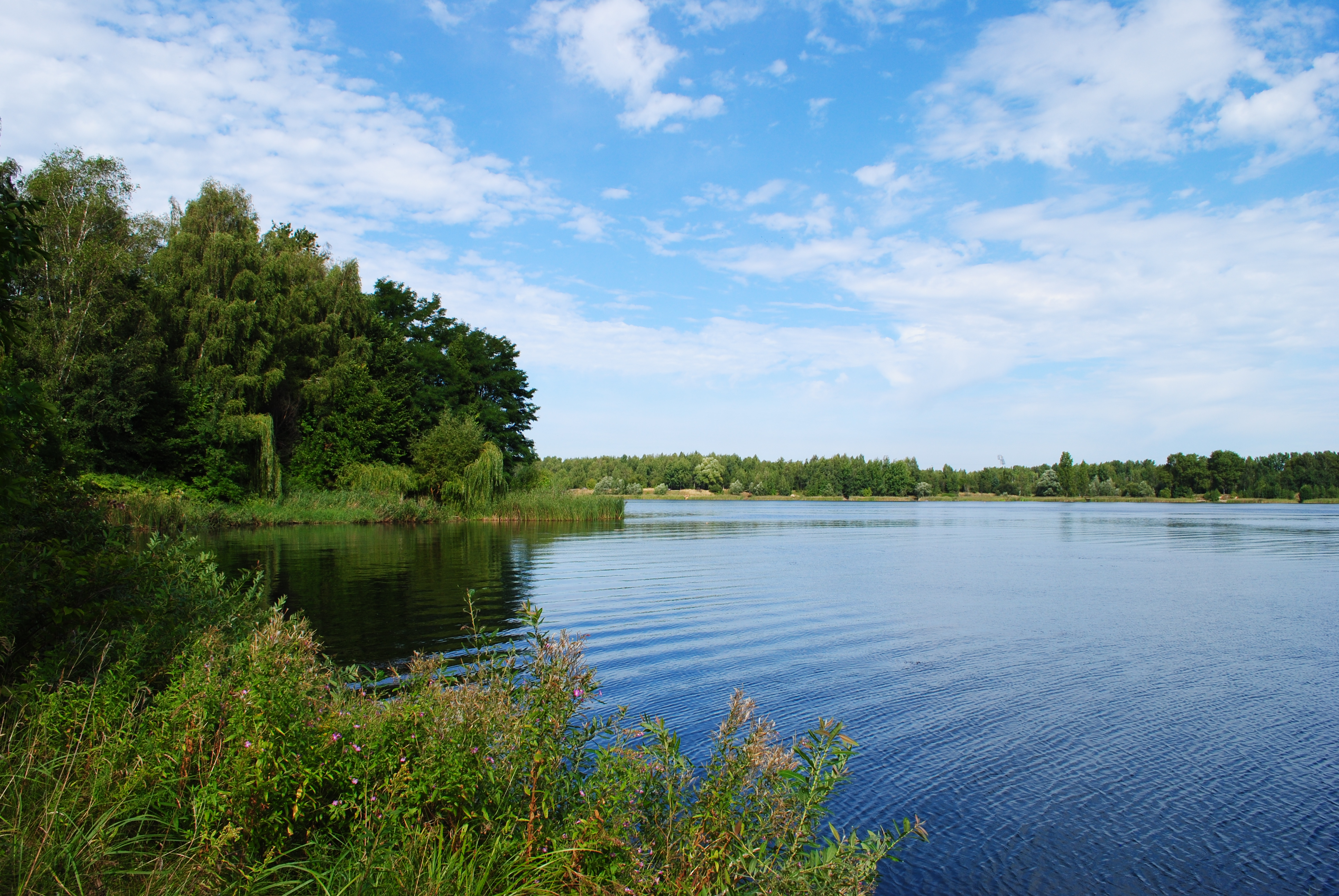
Morawa pond in the Szopienice-Borki nature and landscape complex

The hydrographic network of Szopienice-Burowiec has been significantly altered by human activity, most notably mining, which has led to extensive land subsidence. In former sand pits and subsided areas in the north-eastern part of Szopienice, the Szopienice-Borki pond complex has formed naturally. Five of these ponds rank among the six largest water bodies in Katowice by surface area, with Morawa being the largest pond in the city. None of the ponds exceeds 5 meters in depth. The ponds filled with water in the 1950s and 1960s following the cessation of sand extraction and the discontinuation of dewatering in the excavations. The main named water bodies in Szopienice-Burowiec include:

Name	Area (ha)	Drainage basin
Borki	11.23	endorheic area
Burowiec	0.34	Rawa
Hubertus I	6.93	endorheic area
Hubertus II	18.68	endorheic area
Hubertus III	14.23	endorheic area
Morawa	35.3	endorheic area

According to the 1995 hydrogeological regionalization by Paczyński, Szopienice-Burowiec lies within the XII Silesian-Kraków hydrogeological region. The district is situated within Groundwater Body No. 111. A small northern fragment of the area also overlies part of Major Groundwater Basin No. 329 Bytom, which contains fissure-karst-porous waters in Triassic carbonate formations.

=== Nature and environmental protection ===
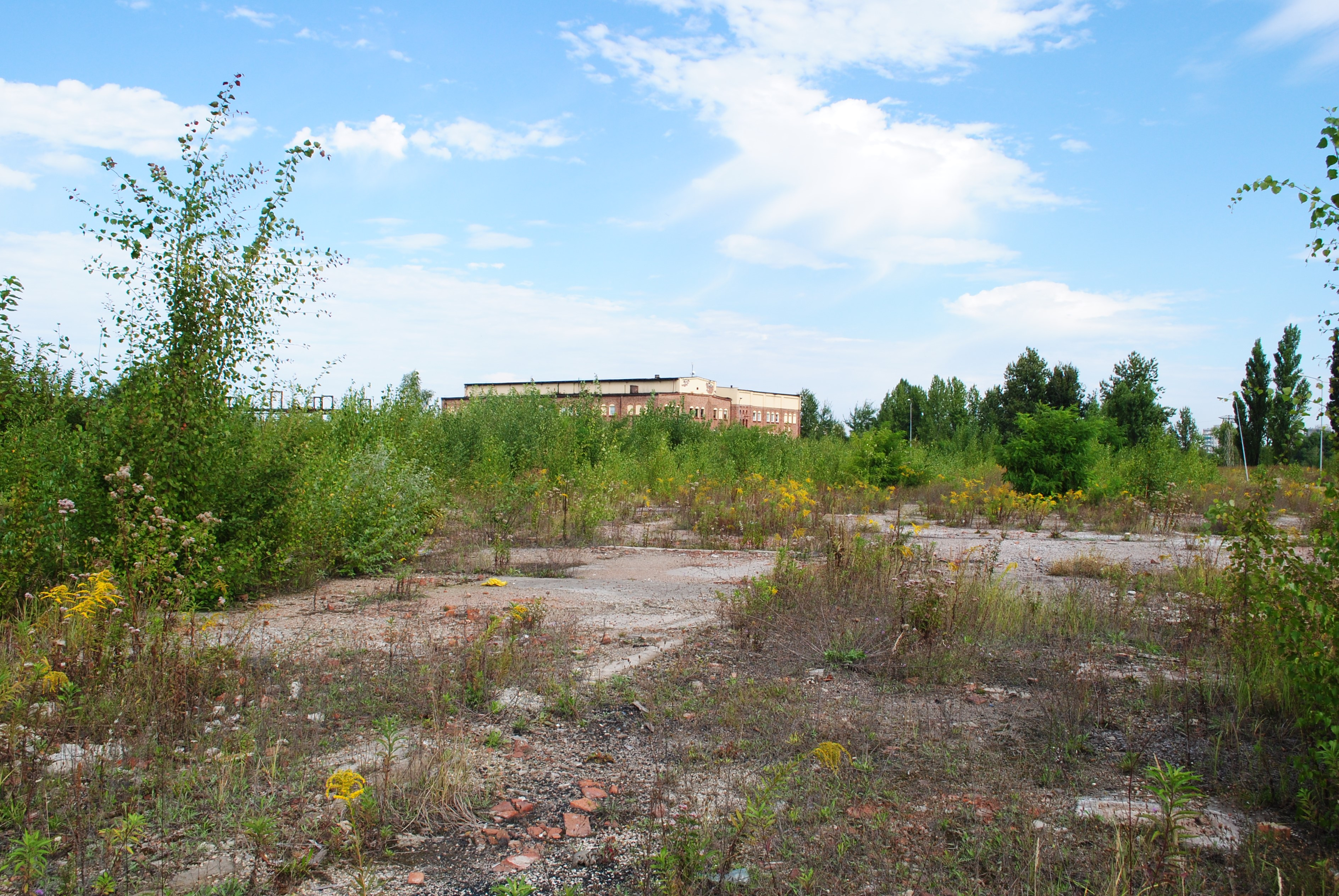
Wastelands overgrown with ruderal vegetation on the site of the former Szopienice Non-Ferrous Metals Smelter

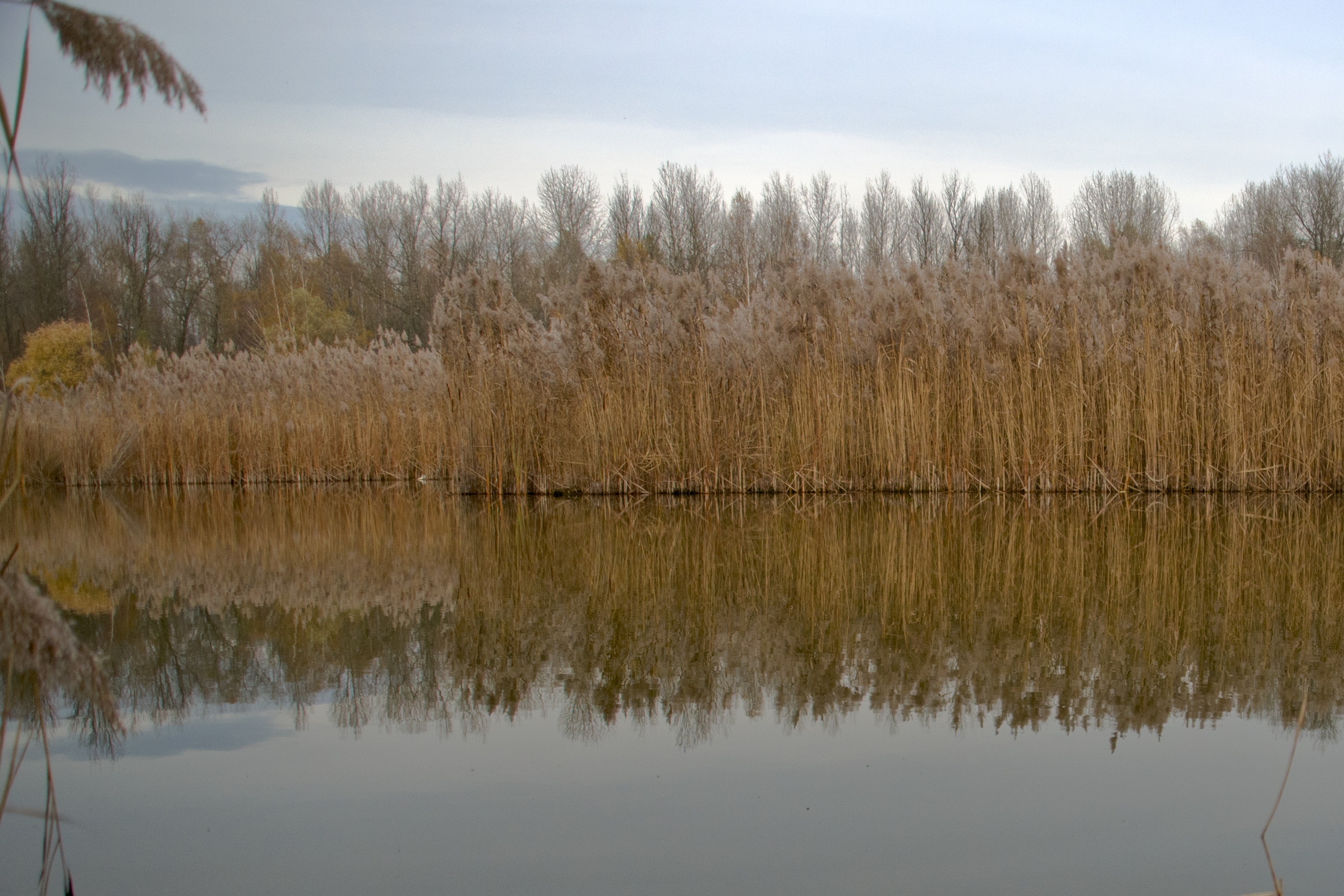
Fragment of the Szopienice-Borki nature and landscape complex – reed bed vegetation on Borki pond

Szopienice-Burowiec ranks among the most heavily transformed districts in Katowice, largely as a result of long-term heavy industrial activity. This has led to widespread soil contamination (particularly with heavy metals), water pollution, and substantial changes to local plant and animal communities. Barren vegetation areas occupy more than 55 ha, while unmanaged green areas cover nearly 110 ha. No forested areas are present within the district. In the functional-spatial structure, unmanaged green spaces and zones of declining agricultural use extend across the northern part of the district, from Burowiec to the Hubertus ponds. The most severely degraded and transformed areas – predominantly wastelands and post-industrial sites – correspond to the former Szopienice Non-Ferrous Metals Smelter, located in the south-eastern and western parts of the district.

Szopienice-Burowiec contains a site of notable natural value: the Szopienice-Borki nature and landscape complex. Established on 29 November 1999, this 157-ha protected area developed in the site of former sand pits that gradually filled with water. It encompasses the surroundings of the Borki, Morawa, and Hubertus ponds and is recognized for its significant natural and landscape qualities. The ponds support more than a dozen fish species, including roach, rudd, perch, pike, bream, crucian carp, and sunbleak. Reed beds along the shores provide habitat for waterfowl and wading birds such as mute swan, mallard, pochard, tufted duck, and coot. The complex hosts the largest breeding colony of black-headed gulls in the Metropolis GZM, along with other protected bird species. Among mammals, muskrats inhabit the ponds, while hedgehogs, weasels, shrews, and various rodents occur in the surrounding areas. Willow-poplar communities dominate the pond margins. In addition to its ecological role, the site serves as a popular recreational space for local residents, cyclists, anglers, and horse riders.

In terms of potential natural vegetation, most of Szopienice-Burowiec – outside of river valleys – belongs to a zone of unknown successional tendency due to severe environmental disturbance. Along the valleys of the Rawa and Brynica rivers, the potential natural vegetation consists of alder and ash-alder riparian forests on periodically waterlogged soils. On devastated and heavily transformed terrains, synanthropic vegetation predominates, including ruderal perennials such as mugwort and burdock. Trampled sites support mat-like communities dominated by broadleaf plantain and ryegrass. The fauna includes species typical of human settlements, such as house sparrow, rock dove, jackdaw, magpie, blackbird, rook, and starling. In allotment gardens, cemeteries, and managed urban green areas, common bird species include tits, jays, starlings, chaffinches, and blackbirds.

The district contains one natural monument: a common horse chestnut tree standing 15 meters tall with a diameter at breast height of 218 cm, located on Ogród Dworcowy Square. It was designated a natural monument on 23 June 2017.

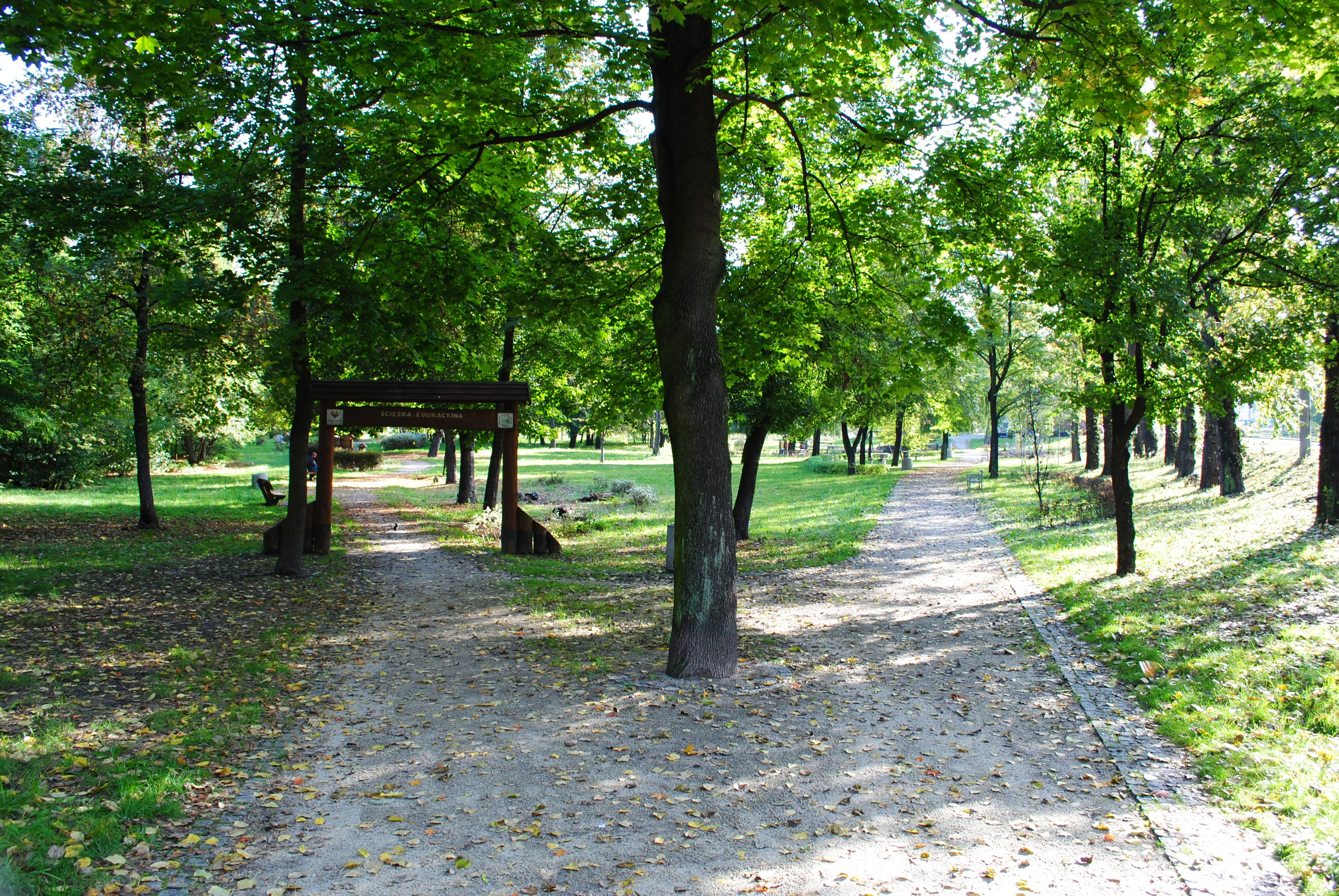
Anton Uthemann Park on Wiosny Ludów Street

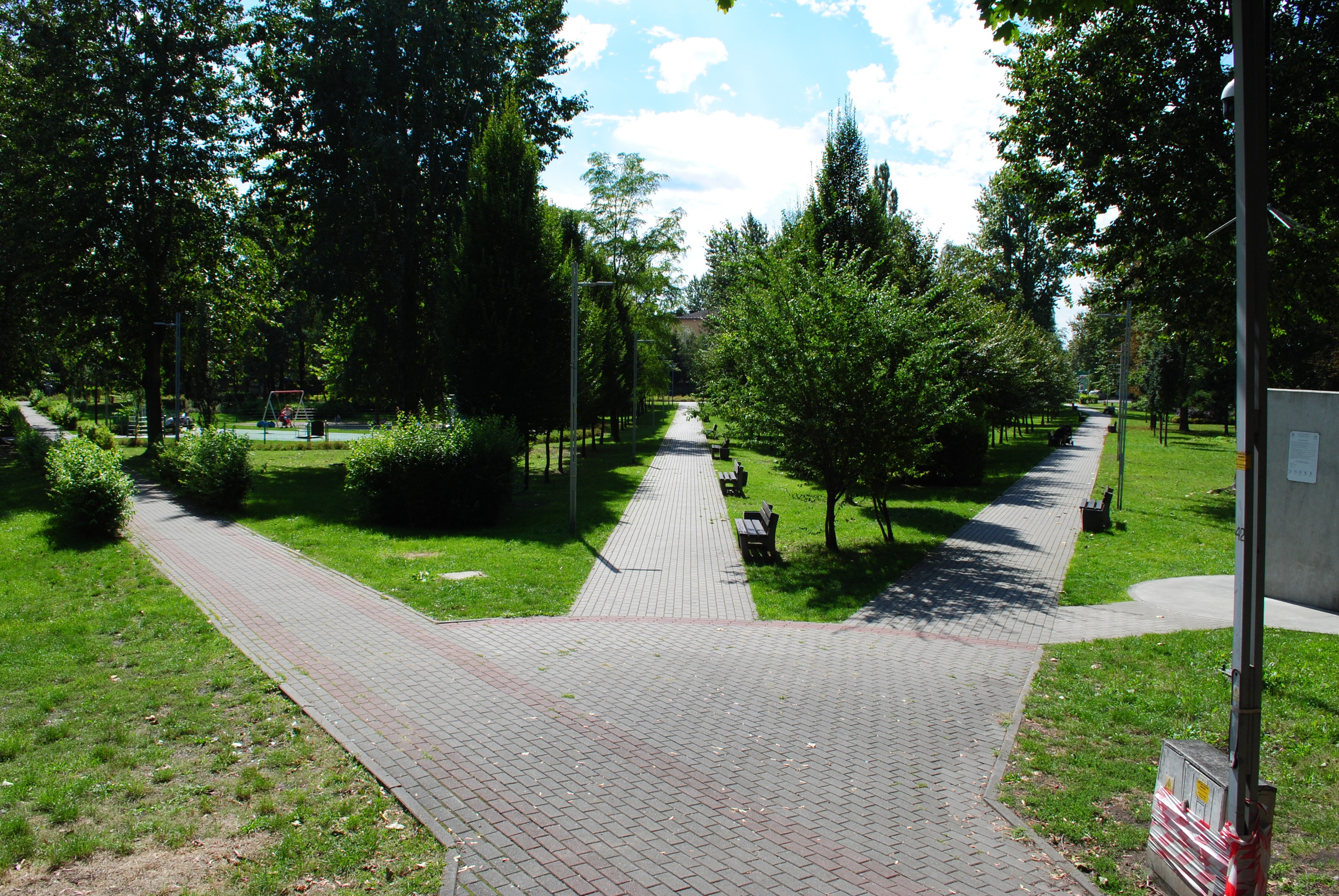
Hilary Krzysztofiak Square at the corner of Obrońców Westerplatte and Józef Haller streets

Managed green spaces within the urbanized parts of Szopienice-Burowiec cover more than 28 ha in total. These include:

- Janina Klatt Square (on Józef Haller Street in Burowiec);
- Hilary Krzysztofiak Square (at the intersection of J. Haller and Obrońców Westerplatte streets);
- Walenty Roździeński Square (between Herbert Bednorz and Obrońców Westerplatte streets);
- Ernest Prittwitz Square (in the area of Obrońców Westerplatte Street);
- Edmund Gryglewicz Square (in the area of Morawa and Bednarska streets);
- Halina Lerman Square (between Wiosny Ludów and L. Zamenhof streets);
- Olympic Athletes Park (near the Katowice Szopienice Południowe railway station);
- Janusz Sidło Square (between 11 Listopada Street and the railway);
- Anton Uthemann Park (on Wiosny Ludów Street).

Allotment gardens in Szopienice-Burowiec are administered under the Katowice Delegation of the Silesian District Board of the Polish Allotment Gardeners' Association. The main gardens are:

Name	Location	Area (ha)	Number of plots (2007)
Bratek, Kolonia 3	Kuśnierska Street	0.14	5
Roździanka, Kolonia 1	Siewna Street	3.32	60
Roździanka, Kolonia 2	Brynicy Street	0.24	10
Roździanka, Kolonia 3	J. Kantorówna Street	0.12	5
Słońce	L. Zamenhof Street	1.19	60

== History ==
=== Origins ===
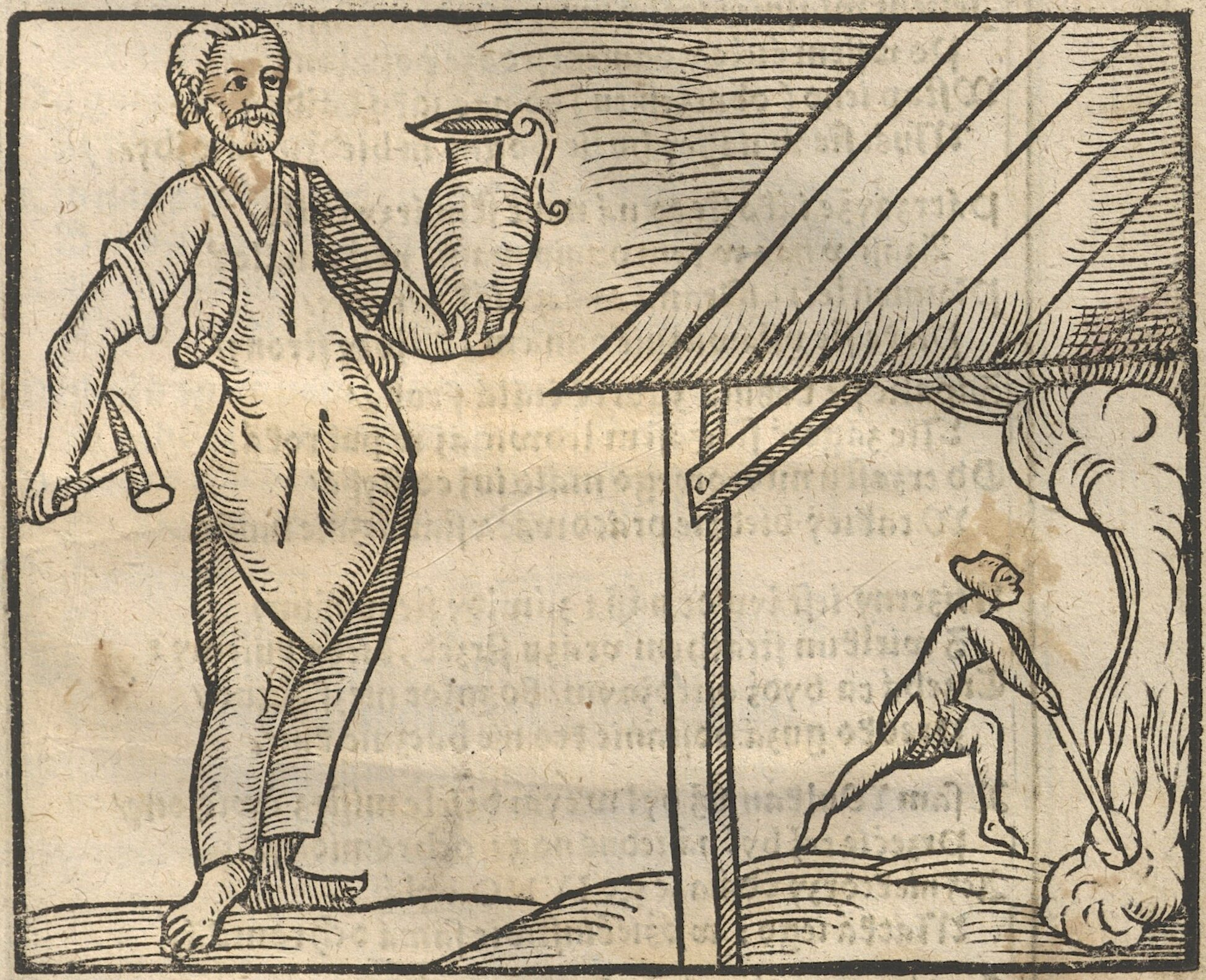
Walenty Roździeński in a woodcut from the poem Officina ferraria

The villages of Roździeń and Szopienice were founded around the 13th century. The earliest documented mention of both appears in a 1360 donation charter issued by Duke Nicholas II, Duke of Racibórz, who granted several villages in the Mysłowice area – including Roździeń and Szopienice – to Otto of Pilica. Szopienice was raided and destroyed in 1430 during the Hussite Wars and remained uninhabited until the mid-16th century. In contrast, Roździeń continued to exist as a free village until the mid-16th century. In 1546, it was purchased by Stanisław Salomon. That same year, a hammer mill was established on the Roździanka (Rawa) river and the Żabiniec pond by a blacksmith named Szych.

Roździeń is notable as the birthplace of Walenty Roździeński, a Silesian blacksmith who authored one of the earliest European metallurgical handbooks: Officina ferraria abo hutá i warstat z kuźniami szlachetnego dzieła żelaznego, published in Kraków in 1612. In 1595, Roździeński became the owner of the hammer mill in Roździeń. His efforts to secure noble privileges led to a conflict with Katarzyna Salomonowa, and by the following year only his wife and sisters remained in the village. The hammer mill continued to operate until 1830.

Settlement in Szopienice resumed in the 1570s. Throughout the 16th to 18th centuries, it remained a small agricultural community, supplemented by animal husbandry and logging. Founded under German law, Szopienice possessed its own communal self-government through its status as a free village, which endured until 1614, when the village was acquired by the heirs of Katarzyna Salomonowa. In 1656, both Szopienice and neighboring Roździeń passed into the possession of the Mieroszewski family, who retained ownership for nearly two centuries.

In the 18th century, the settlement of Burowiec emerged within the territory of the village of Dąbrówka Mała, along the route linking Mysłowice and Siemianowice Śląskie (today's Józef Haller Street). It was associated with several owning families, including the Salomons and Mieroszewskis. From 1839, Burowiec came under the ownership of Maria and Franz von Winckler, and subsequently their daughter Waleska and her husband Hubert von Tiele-Winckler.

=== Industrial Revolution period (19th century) ===
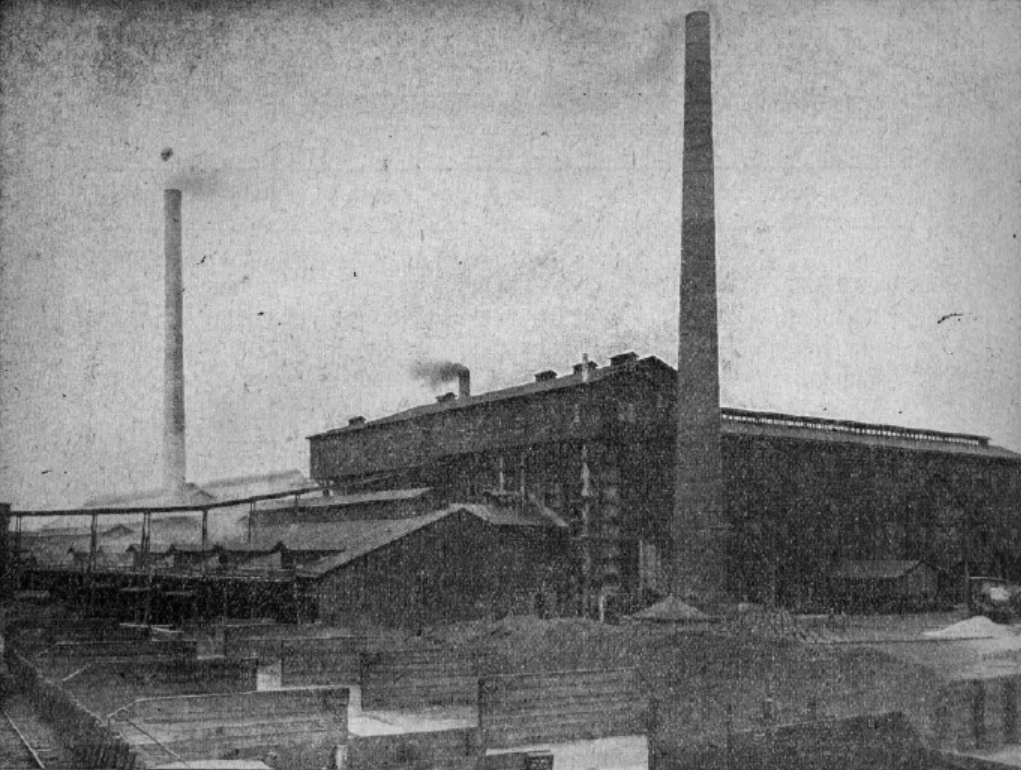
Walther Croneck lead smelter at the present Obrońców Westerplatte Street

Industrial development in Burowiec, Roździeń, and Szopienice began in the first half of the 19th century. In 1834, the company Georg von Giesches Erben established the Wilhelmina Zinc Smelter (later known as the Szopienice Non-Ferrous Metals Smelter). Adjacent to it, near the border with Janów, the Wilhelmina workers' colony was founded. In 1836, the first paved road in the area was constructed, linking Katowice to Mysłowice via the Wilhelmina colony (today's Krakowska Street). In 1847, the Paul zinc smelter (renamed "Paweł" in 1922) was built on the border between Roździeń and Burowiec. Its original owner, Löbbecke, sold the facility in 1861 to the Georg von Giesches Erben concern. Coal mining commenced in 1856 at the Abendstern coal mine (renamed "Jutrzenka" after 1922), which was subsequently acquired by the same company. Additional coal mines in the Szopienice area included Edwin, Teichmannshoffnung, and Abendroth. Between 1860 and 1865, the Morawa colony was established, while around 1890 a familok housing estate known as the Helgoland colony was built in the vicinity of Lwowska and Wałowa streets. Production began in 1864 at the Walther-Croneck silver and lead smelter and the Dietrich iron smelter, the latter situated on the site of the former Roździeń hammer mill near the present-day intersection of Obrońców Westerplatte, Bednarska, and Morawa streets. In the Roździeń area and its surroundings, further coal mines were opened: Louisensglück, Elfriede, and Guter Traugott.

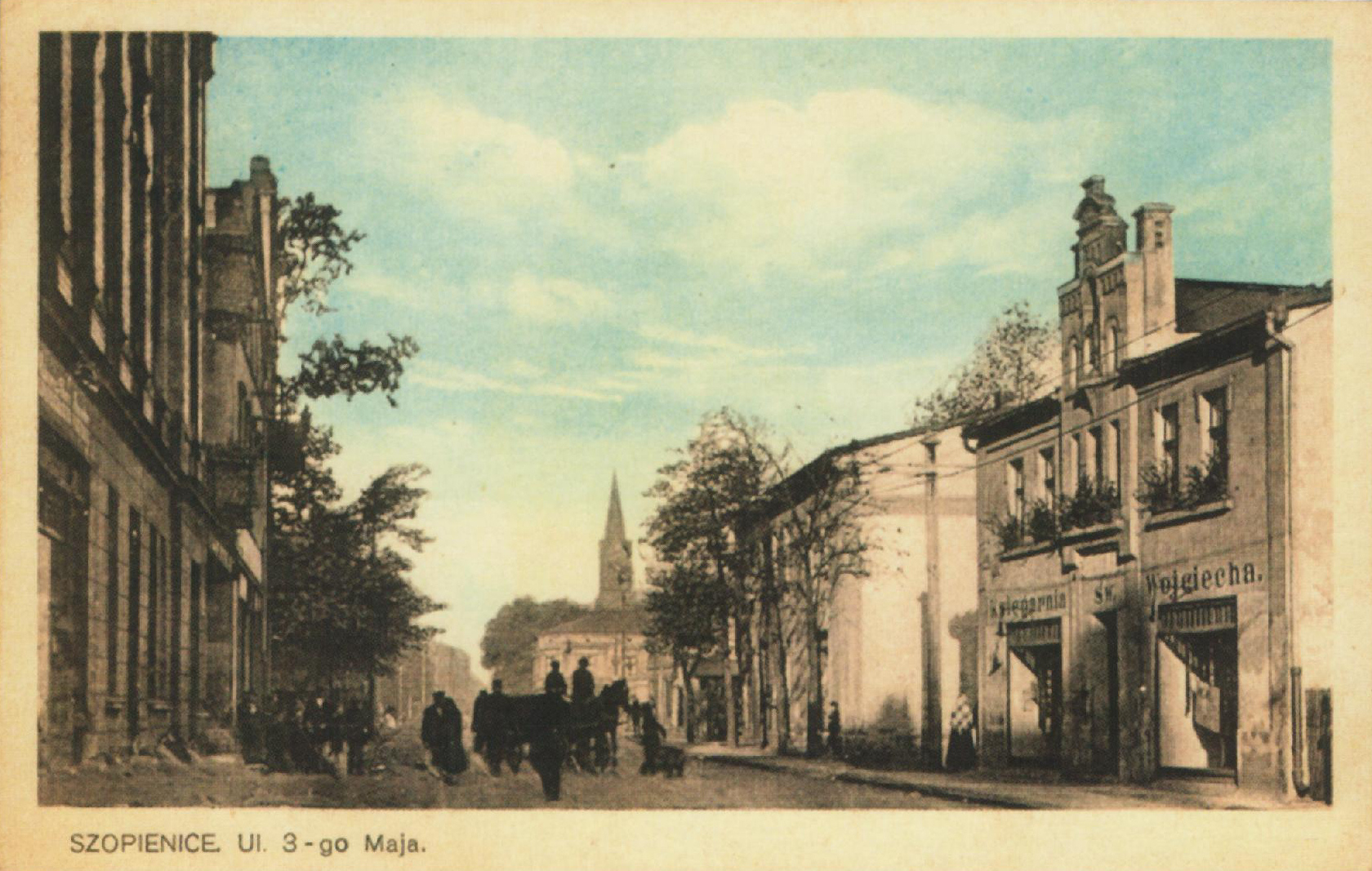
Postcard from 1913 showing the later Wiosny Ludów Street in Szopienice

In 1868, the Katowice Szopienice Północne railway station opened on the Right Bank Oder Railway, which connected Wrocław with Dziedzice (present-day Czechowice-Dziedzice) via Olesno, Tarnowskie Góry, Bytom, Siemianowice Śląskie, and Pszczyna. Two years later, the Katowice Szopienice Południowe railway station was established on the Katowice–Mysłowice/Sosnowiec line. In 1900, a tram line was extended into the present district, linking Królewska Huta (through Hajduki, now Chorzów Batory), Katowice, and Zawodzie to Mysłowice.

The Roman Catholic Roździeń parish (renamed Szopienice parish in 1920) was established on 24 February 1872 (or 1 July 1871). The cornerstone for the Church of St. Hedwig of Silesia was laid on 15 October 1884; construction was completed in 1887, and the church was dedicated on 1 May 1902. Between 1876 and 1877, a school building was erected in Burowiec at the corner of today's J. Haller and Deszczowa streets; by 1899, it served 312 children. In 1888, an Evangelical cemetery was founded, and on 13 March 1899, construction began on the Evangelical Church of the Saviour in Roździeń. The cornerstone was laid on 25 April 1899, and the church was dedicated on 6 March 1901. At the turn of the 19th and 20th centuries, Szopienice and Roździeń gradually merged into a single urban entity. A shared center emerged in the area of Lwowska, Herbert Bednorz, and Józefa Kantorówna streets, featuring churches, a school, and a commercial hub.

Between 1882 and 1887, the management headquarters for the smelters and mines of Georg von Giesches Erben was located in Roździeń. At the end of the 19th century, a large brewery was constructed near the intersection of H. Bednorz and Obrońców Westerplatte streets; its owner was a local resident named Mokrski. On 1 January 1912, the company opened the first hall of the Uthemann zinc smelter.

=== Silesian Uprisings and the plebiscite ===
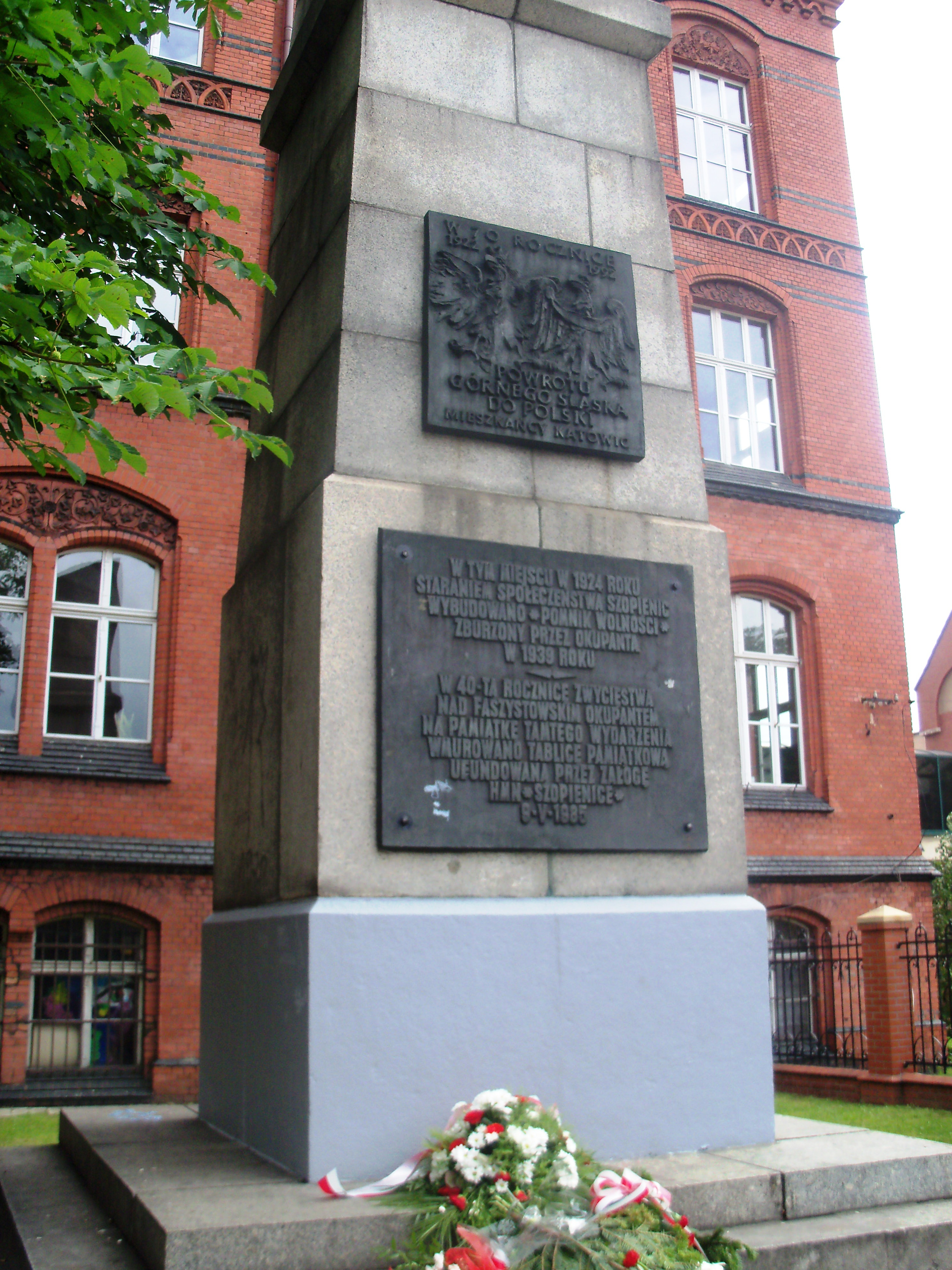
Monument to the Silesian Insurgent located at Silesian Insurgents Square, with a plaque commemorating the incorporation of part of Upper Silesia into Poland, as well as the site where the Freedom Monument stood in 1924, destroyed by the Germans in 1939

Residents of Roździeń and Szopienice played an active role in the Silesian Uprisings. The settlements' strategic position near the border facilitated contact with the newly independent Polish state, particularly through road and railway bridges spanning the Brynica river.

During the 1921 plebiscite, approximately 70% of Szopienice voters supported incorporation into Poland. In Roździeń, a total of 5,696 votes were cast in favor of joining Poland. In 1921, during the Third Silesian Uprising, the building at 2 Lwowska Street (now the seat of Jan Długosz High School) served as the headquarters of Wojciech Korfanty and the High Command of the Insurgent Forces. Insurgents from Szopienice and Roździeń participated in combat operations, including the fighting for Kędzierzyn and at Annaberg. The Polish army entered Szopienice on 20 June 1922.

=== Interwar period and World War II ===
In the interwar years, administrative changes occurred in the area. In 1924, manorial estates were abolished, with one such estate incorporated into Szopienice. On 1 December 1930, Szopienice and Roździeń were merged to form a single gmina named Roździeń-Szopienice. On 14 January 1934, the gmina's name was officially changed to Szopienice. During this period, a town hall and adjacent buildings were constructed in the vicinity of Wiosny Ludów Street. The economic crisis of the 1930s led to frequent labor protests, including actions by workers at the Uthemann smelter and the Ropag signal factory, organized by local communists. One of the larger strikes in Roździeń took place in 1935 at the Szczęście Luizy mine (formerly Louisensglück), which had been reactivated in 1933.

On 10 July 1939, the Silesian Parliament passed an act granting Szopienice town privileges, effective from 1 January 1940. Due to the outbreak of World War II and the subsequent German occupation, this status was not implemented until 1 January 1947. In September 1939, Szopienice was occupied by German forces and became a site of Nazi repression. The police station at 15 Lwowska Street served as a place of torture for prisoners. The town was liberated by units of the Red Army's Ukrainian Front on 27 January 1945.

=== Post-war period ===
From 1 December 1945 to 31 December 1946, Szopienice served as the seat of the rural gmina of Szopienice. On 1 April 1951, the urban gmina was abolished, and the Szopienice urban county was established, incorporating the previously independent gminas of Dąbrówka Mała (including Burowiec) and Janów. On 31 December 1959, Szopienice was annexed to Katowice.

In June 1992, commemorative events were held in Szopienice to mark the 70th anniversary of the incorporation of Upper Silesia into Poland. The celebrations were attended by, among others, Archbishop Damian Zimoń and Katowice Voivode Wojciech Czech. On this occasion, the Monument to the Silesian Insurgents was unveiled at Silesian Insurgents Square.

On 27 January 2023, an explosion occurred in the building of the Evangelical-Augsburg parish vicarage, resulting in the deaths of two people and the complete destruction of the structure.

== Demography ==
Population structure in Szopienice-Burowiec by sex and age (as of 31 December 2015)
Age/Population	0–18 years	18–60/65 years	over 60/65 years	Total
Total	2,817	9,355	2,728	14,900
Women	1,423	4,518	1,955	7,896
Men	1,394	4,837	773	7,004
Feminization ratio	102	93	253	113

The earliest reliable population data for the area now encompassed by the Szopienice-Burowiec district date from the late 18th century. In 1783, Roździeń had 114 inhabitants, while Szopienice recorded 74 residents in 1784. By 1819, Szopienice had grown to 189 inhabitants, increasing slightly to 196 by 1830, when Roździeń had 392 residents. In 1861, Roździeń counted 1,637 Roman Catholics (93.2% of the population), 67 Protestants, and 52 Jews. In the same year, Szopienice had 1,868 inhabitants, including 1,760 Catholics (94.2%), 79 Protestants, and 29 of the Mosaic faith.

Population growth accelerated significantly at the turn of the 19th and 20th centuries due to industrial development. In 1885, Roździeń had 4,782 residents in the rural area and 998 on the manorial estate, while Szopienice recorded 4,481 in the rural area and 1,440 on the manorial estate. That year, Bagno had 472 inhabitants and Borki 1,253. In 1890, Burowiec was home to 2,081 people.

Following a peak in the mid-20th century, the population of Szopienice-Burowiec has declined steadily since 1988. In 1988, the area within the current district boundaries had 19,354 residents, with a relatively even age distribution. By 2007, the population had fallen to 17,139, showing a slight predominance in the 15–29 age group and a smaller proportion of children up to 14 years. As of 31 December 2015, Szopienice-Burowiec had 14,900 inhabitants.

Detailed historical population figures for Roździeń and Szopienice (excluding Burowiec) up to 1939, and for District No. 15 Szopienice-Burowiec from 1988 onward:

Notes and data sources: 1783 (Roździeń); 1784 (Szopienice); 1830; 1855; 1861; 1885 (excluding the manorial estates of Roździeń and Szopienice, where 2,438 people lived at the time); 1890 (at that time, Szopienice together with the Wilhelmina colony had 6,177 people); 1905; 1910; 1939 (as of 17 May); 1988; 2005; 2010; 2015; 2019.

== Politics and administration ==
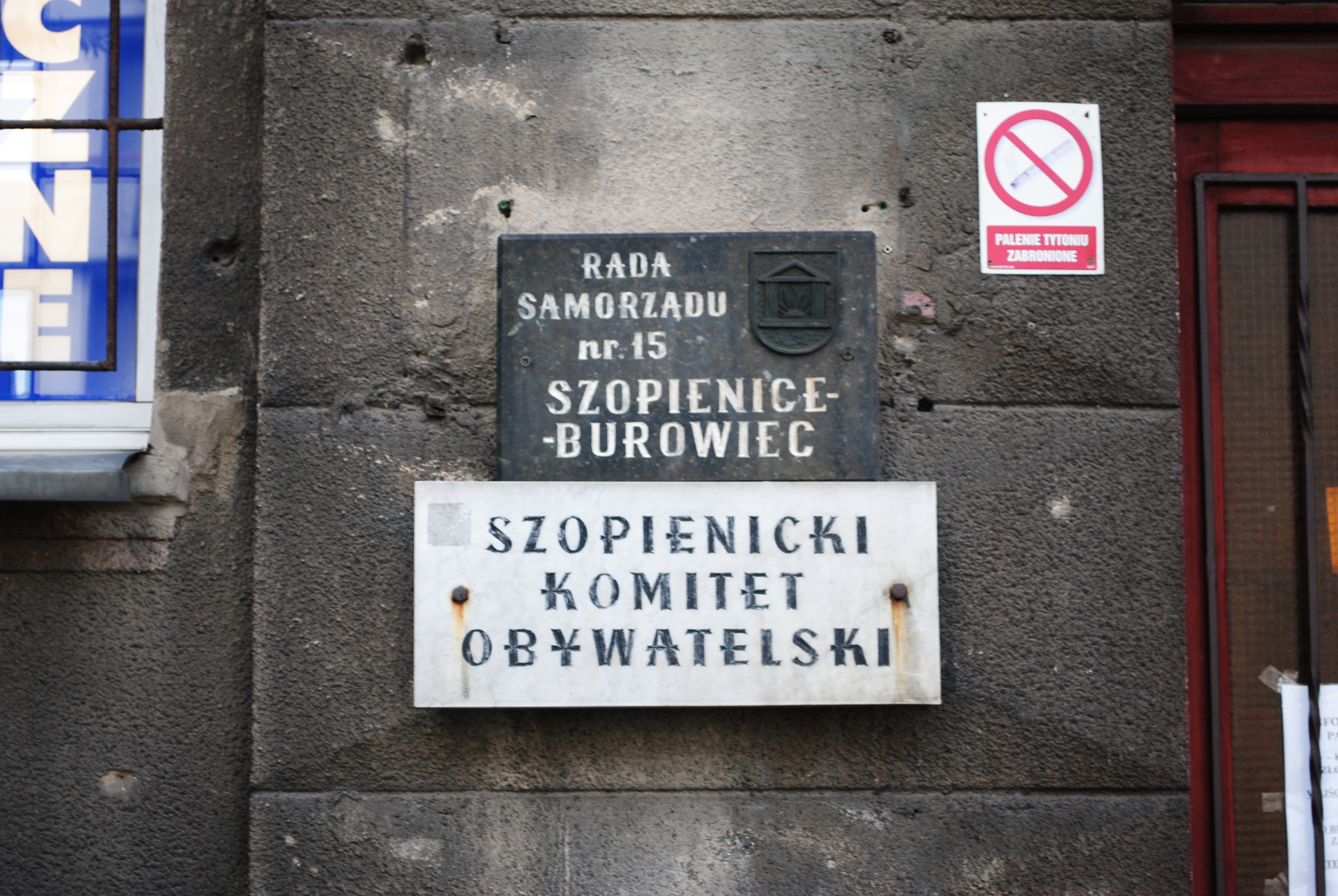
Plaque of the Council of Auxiliary Unit No. 15 Szopienice-Burowiec on the building of the former Gmina Szopienice town hall

The areas of Roździeń and Szopienice, first documented in 1360, changed ownership multiple times throughout their history. In 1474, Duke Wenceslaus III pledged Roździeń to Jakub Dembiński, Voivode of Sandomierz. In 1536, Stanisław Salomon acquired the newly formed Mysłowice estates, which included Roździeń and Szopienice, purchasing them from Jan Thurzo. 10 years later, he bought the village rights of Roździeń, gaining self-government privileges there, while Szopienice retained its free village status until 1614, when it was acquired by the heirs of Katarzyna Salomonowa. In 1656, both villages were purchased at auction by Krzysztof Mieroszewski and remained in the possession of the Mieroszewski family until 1839, when Maria Winckler became the owner.

Burowiec, which developed within the territory of Dąbrówka Mała, was linked to several owning families, including the Salomons and Mieroszewskis. In 1839, it passed to Maria and Franz von Winckler, and later to their daughter Waleska and her husband Hubert von Tiele-Winckler. At the beginning of the 20th century, Burowiec formed part of Gmina Dąbrówka Mała.

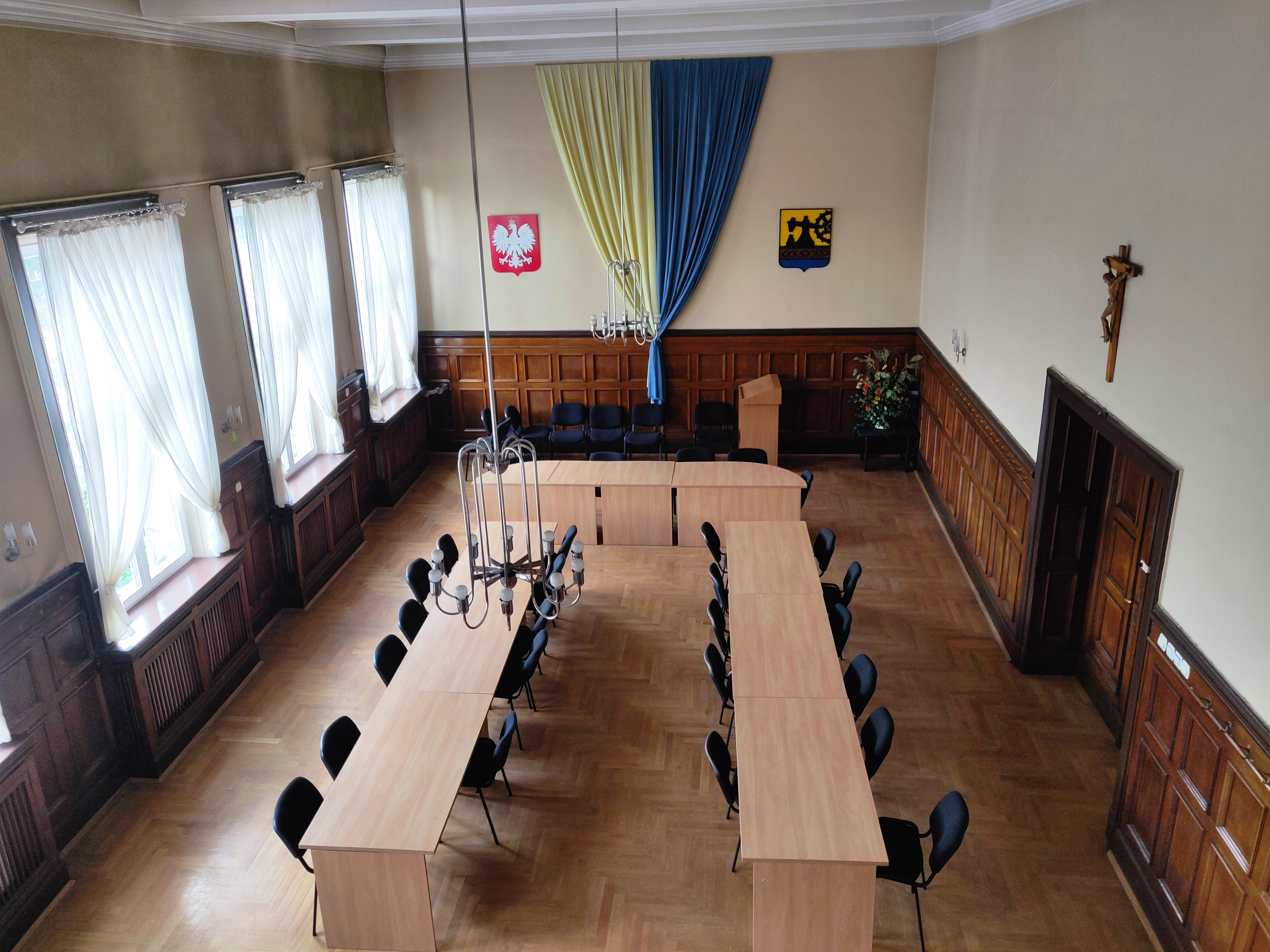
Session hall in the former town hall of Gmina Szopienice; now the seat of the Council and Board of District No. 15 Szopienice-Burowiec

In 1924, manorial estates were abolished, with one incorporated into Szopienice. On 1 December 1930, Szopienice and Roździeń were united into a single gmina named Roździeń-Szopienice. On 14 January 1934, the name was changed to Szopienice. During this time, the town hall was constructed at what is now 24 Wiosny Ludów Street.

By an act of the Silesian Parliament dated 10 July 1939, Szopienice was granted town privileges, effective from 1 January 1940. Due to the outbreak of World War II and the German occupation, this status was implemented only on 1 January 1947. From 1 December 1945 to 31 December 1946, Szopienice served as the seat of the rural gmina of Szopienice. On 1 April 1951, the urban gmina was dissolved, and the Szopienice urban county was established, incorporating the former gminas of Dąbrówka Mała (including Burowiec) and Janów. On 31 December 1959, Szopienice was incorporated into Katowice. On 1 January 1992, 22 Auxiliary Self-Government Units were created in Katowice, including the Szopienice-Burowiec unit. On 29 September 1997, the Katowice City Council adopted a resolution establishing a new division into auxiliary self-government units, designating Szopienice-Burowiec as Unit No. 15 and defining its precise boundaries.

In elections to the Katowice City Council, Szopienice-Burowiec belongs to Electoral District No. 2, which also includes Dąbrówka Mała, Janów-Nikiszowiec, Giszowiec, and Murcki. From 2018 to 2023, this district had five representatives on the City Council.

The district is governed by the Council of District No. 15 Szopienice-Burowiec, seated in the former Gmina Szopienice office building at 24 Wiosny Ludów Street. In the 2018–2024 term, Jan Flasza served as Chairman of the Council. The board was chaired by Piotr Łączniak from 2018 to 2023 and by Tomasz Rokicki from 2023 onward (with the current board functioning until 30 September 2025). The council uses the former coat of arms of Gmina Szopienice. During the fifth term (2014–2018), the council undertook numerous initiatives, including measures to enhance public safety, the construction of sports and recreational facilities in parks and squares, the organization of festivals, participation in ceremonial events and anniversaries, and other community-oriented activities.

== Economy ==
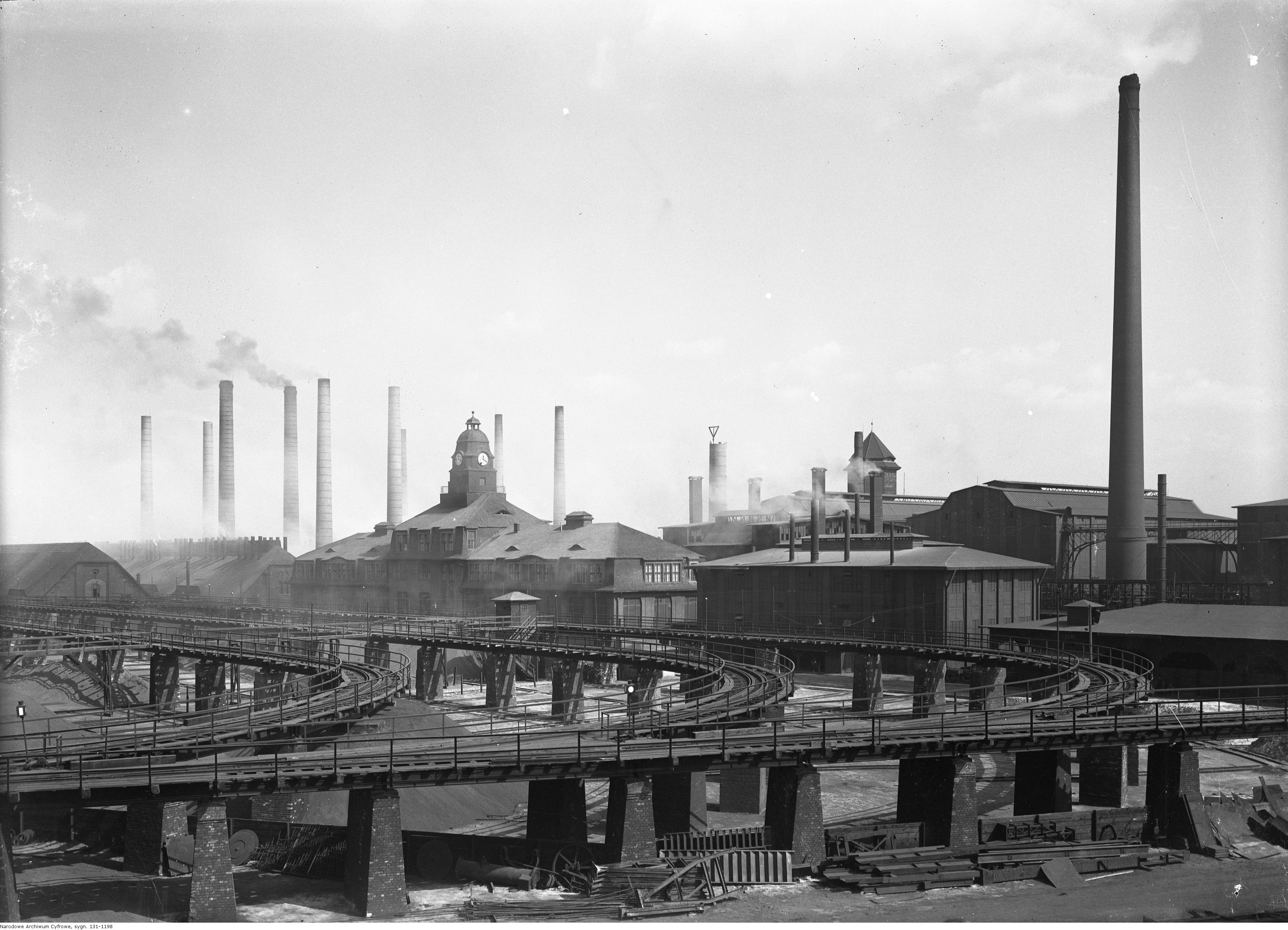
Uthemann zinc smelter in a photograph from the interwar period

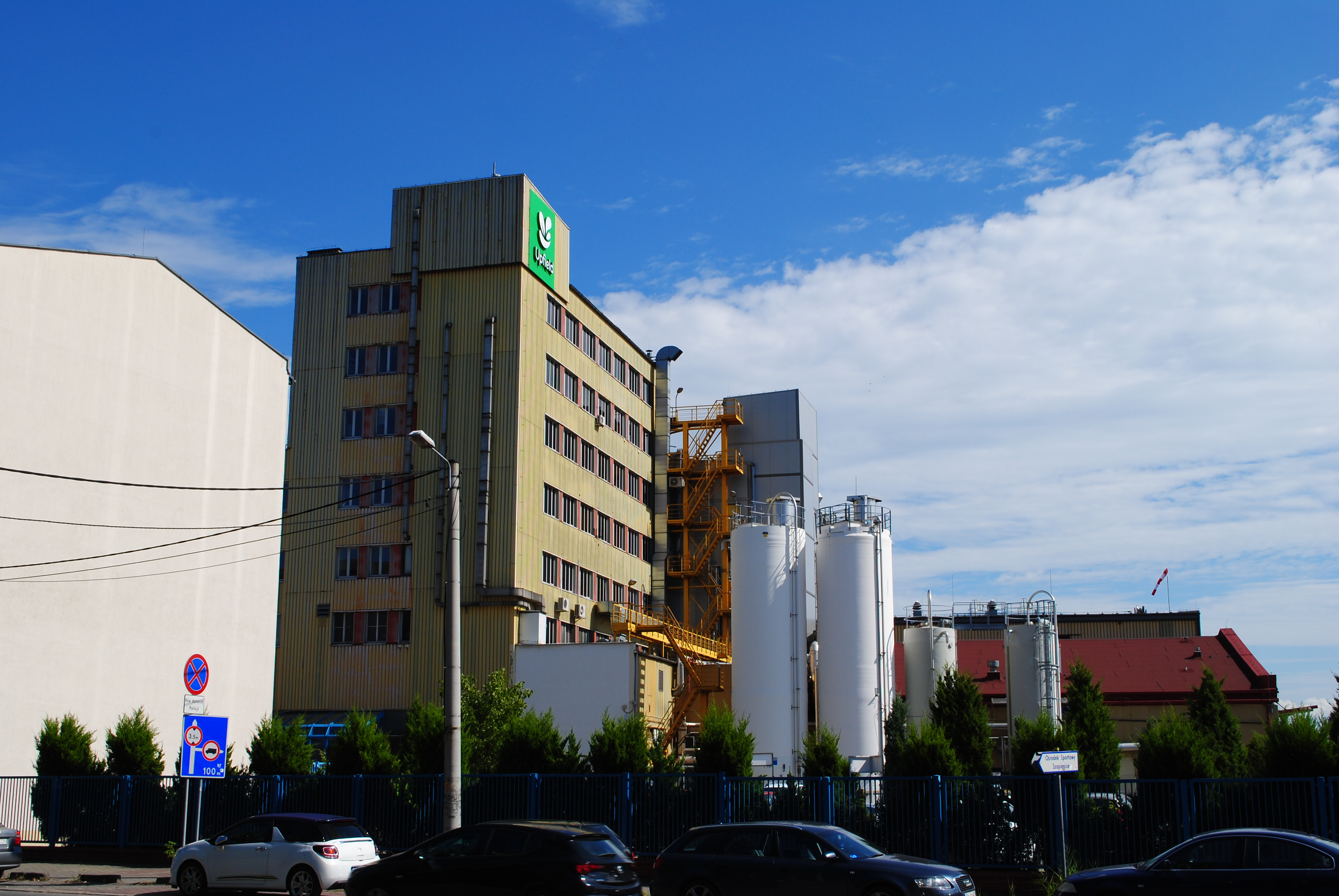
Unilever Polska production plant on Kołodziejska Street

Szopienice-Burowiec has remained an important industrial centre since the Industrial Revolution, which began there in the first half of the 19th century with the development of coal mining and zinc metallurgy. The first zinc smelter, Wilhelmina, was established in 1834 by the Georg von Giesches Erben concern. Further plants followed in subsequent decades, including the modern Uthemann zinc smelter, which commenced operations in 1912. After 1945 the facilities were nationalised and, following reorganisation, the metallurgical works officially adopted the name Szopienice Non-Ferrous Metals Smelter on 27 July 1972. In the post-war period other enterprises also operated in the district, notably the Silesian Fat Industry Plants, created on the basis of the former Alboril works (now part of Unilever).

After 1989 the economy of Szopienice-Burowiec underwent restructuring. The Szopienice Non-Ferrous Metals Smelter entered liquidation on 26 September 2008. New industrial facilities emerged alongside a growing service sector. The largest enterprises currently operating in the district are:

- Baterpol Lead Plant (108 Obrońców Westerplatte Street) – battery recycling and producer of refined lead and lead alloys;
- Elbud (19 H. Bednorz Street) – construction company specialising in high- and extra-high-voltage power engineering;
- Szopienice Metal Foundry (24 K. Woźniak Street) – established in 2001 after separation from the Szopienice Non-Ferrous Metals Smelter; manufactures semi-finished products from copper and its alloys, as well as castings in iron, steel, lead, zinc, tin and various metal alloys (including zinc-aluminium);
- Rockwell Automation Polska (49 W. Roździeński Avenue) – provider of industrial automation and IT solutions;
- Unilever Polska production plant (2 Kołodziejska Street) – one of four Unilever factories in Poland; handles, among other activities, tea packaging.

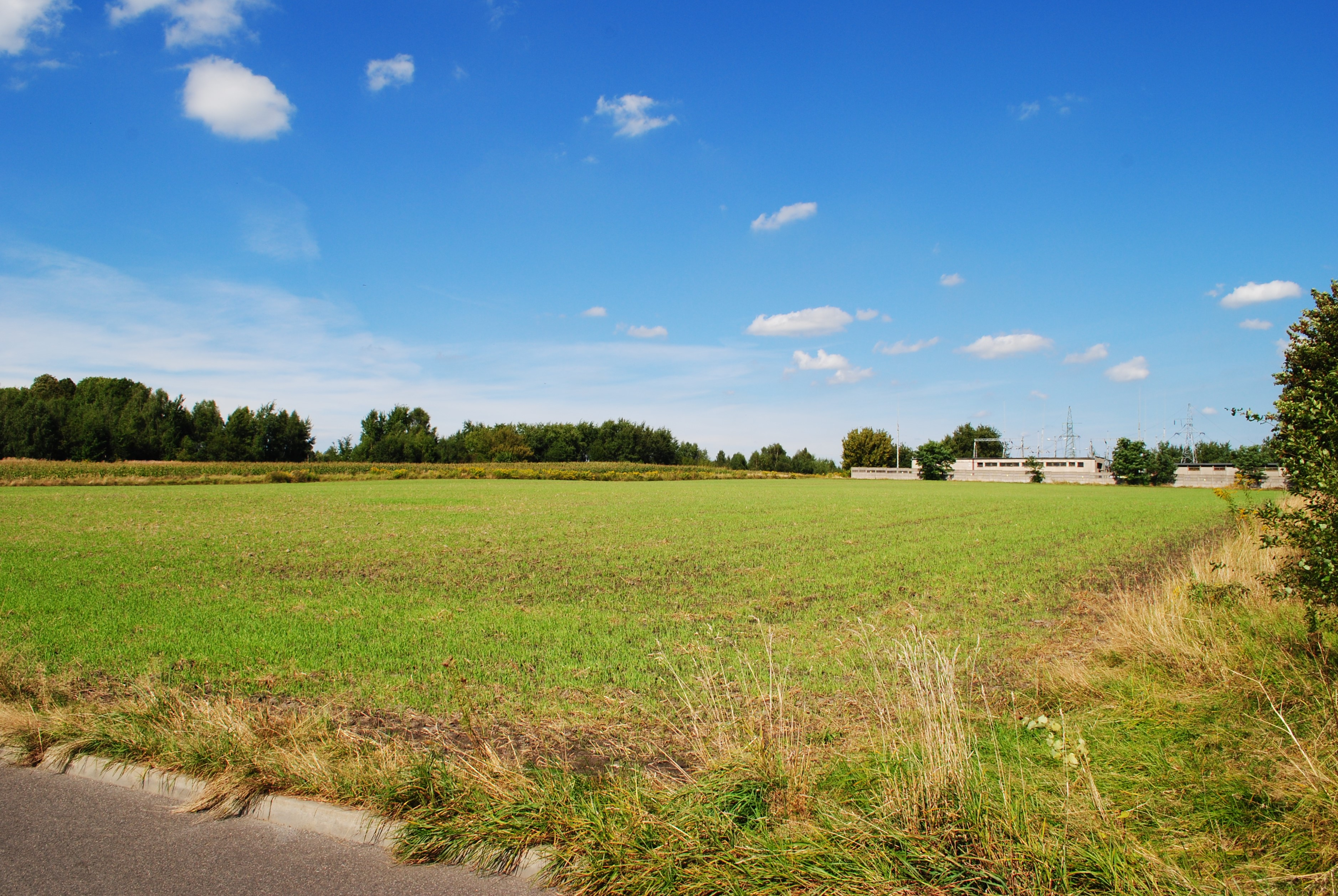
Arable land on Brynica Street

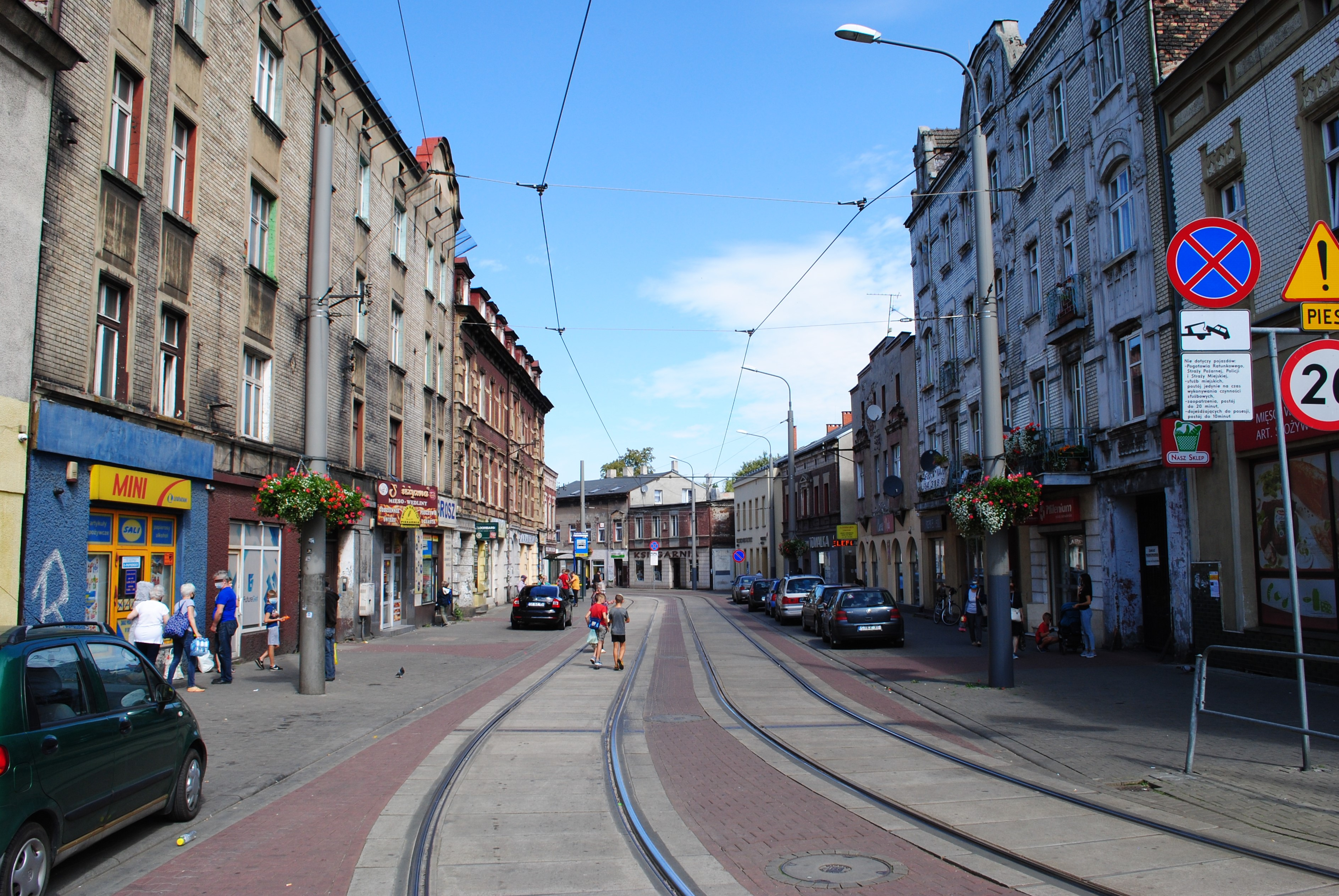
Obrońców Westerplatte Street in the center of Szopienice-Burowiec – one of the local commercial and service centers in the district

In 2007, the district had one of the highest proportions of industrial and service land among all Katowice districts, amounting to 14.02% of its total area (116.7 ha). Agricultural use persists: in the same year cropland covered 29.26 ha (3.52% of the district), the third-largest share in the city after Zarzecze and Podlesie; according to cadastral records, arable land totalled 103.6 ha. Farming is concentrated mainly between Roździeń and Borki (along J. Korczak and Brynica streets) and north of Borki.

As of 31 December 2013, 1,738 economic entities were registered in the REGON system in Szopienice-Burowiec, representing 3.8% of all entities in Katowice; of these, 1,556 were micro-enterprises (102 per 1,000 inhabitants). In 2013, the district recorded 909 registered unemployed people – the highest unemployment rate relative to population among Katowice's 22 districts.

Main trade facilities include:

- Castorama (198 W. Roździeński Avenue) – one of the first 10 stores of this chain in Poland;
- Dąbrówka Shopping Centre (200 W. Roździeński Avenue) – among the earliest centres of its kind in the region; anchors include the first Carrefour hypermarket in Katowice;
- Selgros Cash & Carry Katowice (32 Lwowska Street) – part of the nationwide wholesale network.

Two local commercial and service centres have developed, providing everyday retail (primarily grocery), financial services (including bank branches), postal services, healthcare and educational facilities. The first lies on the Roździeń–Burowiec border along J. Haller and Obrońców Westerplatte streets (up to J. Korczak Street) and in the Wandy and Siewna streets area. The second is situated on the Roździeń–Szopienice border around Silesian Insurgents Square, Obrońców Westerplatte and H. Bednorz streets (up to the intersection), Wiosny Ludów Street (up to Ratuszowa Street) and Lwowska Street (up to the railway viaduct).

== Technical infrastructure ==
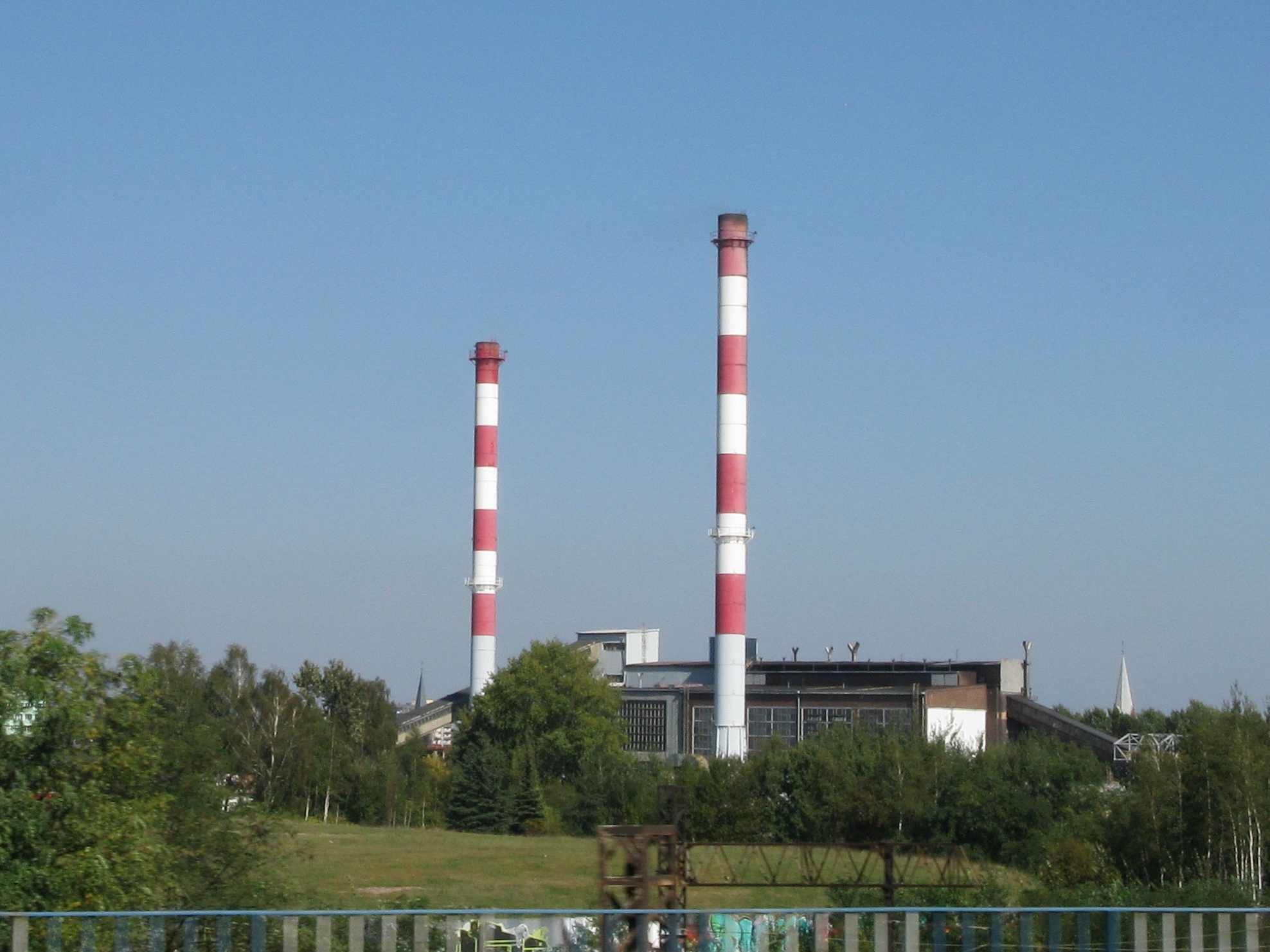
Dalkia Polska Energia – Szopienice Production Plant (formerly Szopienice Heat and Power Plant)

Electricity supply to Szopienice-Burowiec is provided through a 110 kV high-voltage network connected to nearby power plants, with energy transmitted via local electrical substations. Two substations are located within the district: Szopienice (on Brynica Street) and Szopienice Wschód (on the grounds of the former Szopienice Non-Ferrous Metals Smelter). The western part of the district – running through the Gigablok Sewage Treatment Plant and extending north along Miedziana Street – is crossed by the 220 kV highest-voltage line Łagisza – Byczyna/Halemba – Kopanina – Katowice. The average per capita electricity consumption in Katowice in 2006 was 865.7 kWh.

District heating serves part of the built-up area in Szopienice-Burowiec and is distributed by Dalkia Polska Energia. One of its facilities, the Szopienice Production Plant (formerly the Szopienice Heat and Power Plant), is located at 19 11 Listopada Street. As of September 2009, the plant had a heating capacity of 76.5 MW and an electrical capacity of 3.0 MW.

Drinking water for residents is primarily sourced from surface intakes on the Vistula river (Goczałkowice Lake) and the Soła river (Tresna – Porąbka – Czaniec cascade). It is transported via transmission pipelines operated by the Upper Silesian Water Supply Company. The main supply network in Szopienice-Burowiec runs along the border with Sosnowiec and partially parallel to Bagienna Street toward Mysłowice. Within Katowice, water distribution is handled by Katowickie Wodociągi, whose local headquarters is situated at 89 Obrońców Westerplatte Street. The district falls under the responsibility of the Water Network Operation Center-Center branch, located at 9a Milowicka Street.

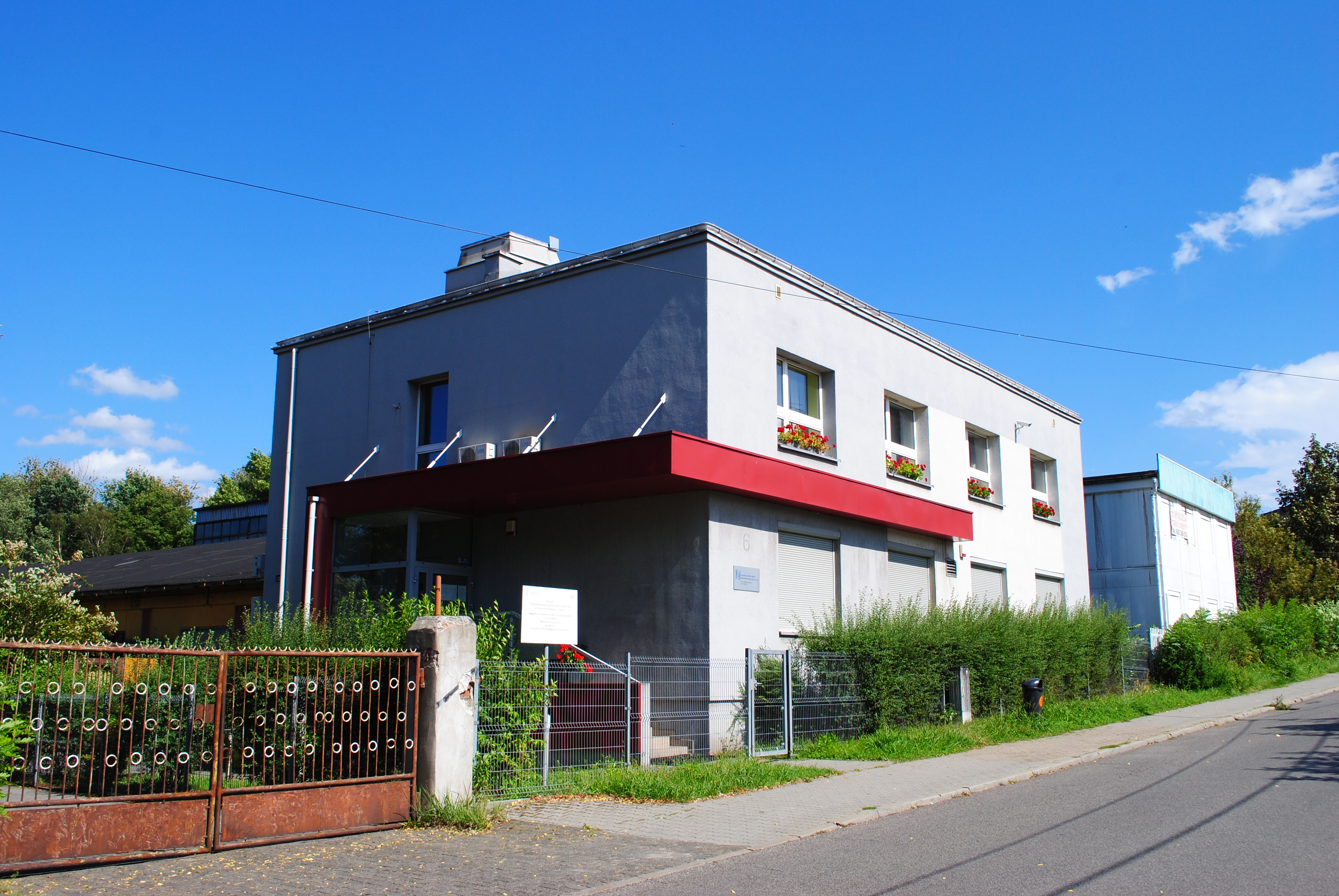
Headquarters of the non-existent Katowice Water and Sewage Infrastructure at Wandy Street

The sewerage system is also managed by Katowickie Wodociągi. The Gigablok Sewage Treatment Plant, owned by the Katowice Water and Sewage Infrastructure company and operated by Katowickie Wodociągi, is located in the district. Constructed on the site of an older facility, it was gradually commissioned starting in 2006. Despite its presence, most wastewater from Szopienice-Burowiec is directed to the small mechanical treatment plants Dąbrówka (Kuśnierska Street) and Szopienice (L. Zamenhof Street), both of which belong to the catchment area of the Dąbrówka Mała-Centrum Sewage Treatment Plant. A combined sewer system predominates in the district, serving older buildings. In Burowiec and the Rybki housing estate, however, the network is separated into sanitary and stormwater systems; both are collected into a main collector and conveyed under W. Roździeński Avenue to the Dąbrówka Mała-Centrum facility.

Until 31 December 2021, the headquarters of the Katowice Water and Sewage Infrastructure company, responsible for managing water and sewage assets as well as network modernisation and development (including projects co-financed by European funds), was located at 6 Wandy Street in Roździeń. On that date, the entity was transformed into the joint-stock company Katowickie Inwestycje.

Road infrastructure in Katowice, including roads, bridges, underpasses, and pedestrian footbridges, is supervised by the Municipal Roads and Bridges Authority, whose office is located at 2a J. Kantorówna Street in Szopienice.

== Transport ==
=== Road transport ===
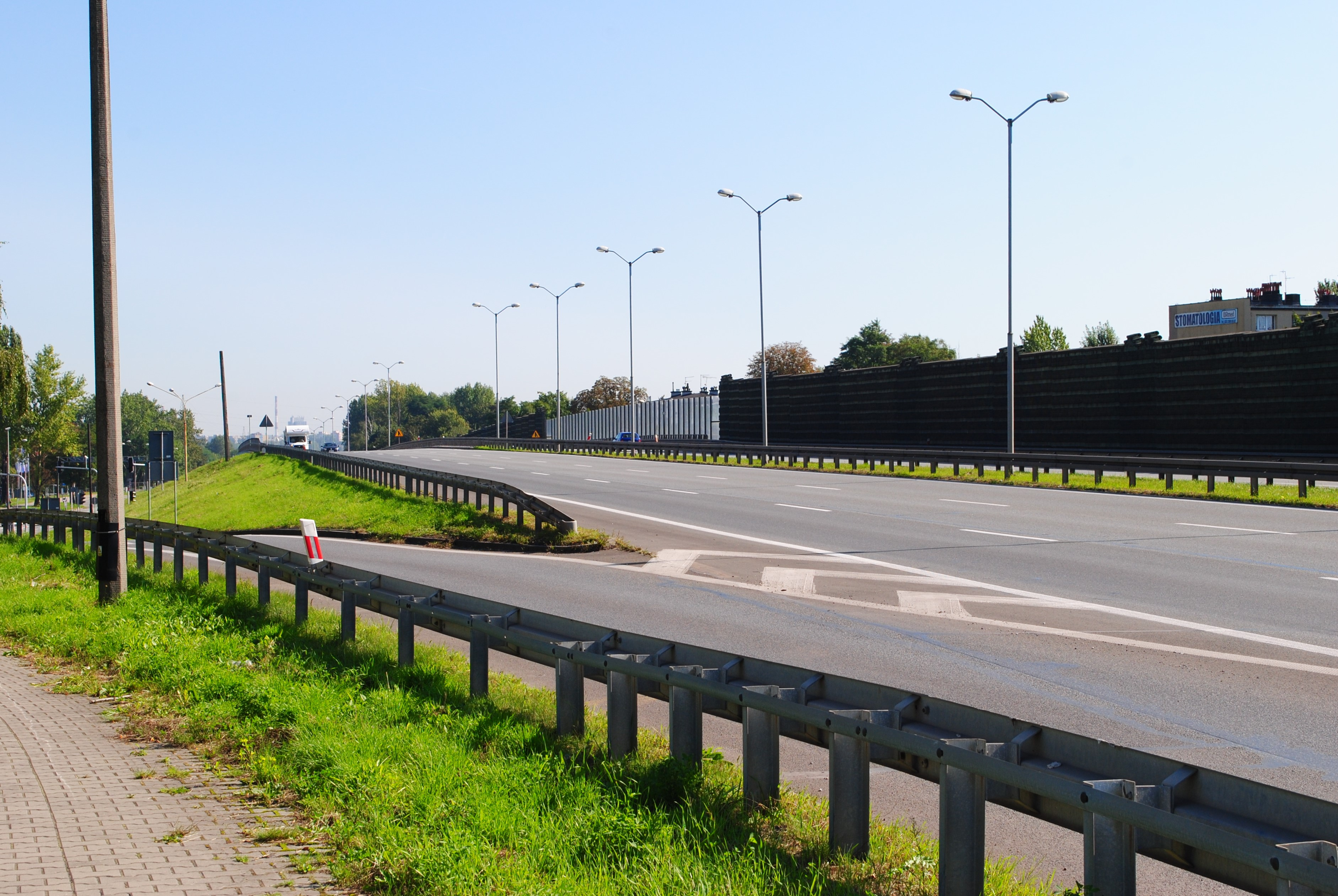
W. Roździeński Avenue (S86) at the height of Burowiec (view toward Sosnowiec)

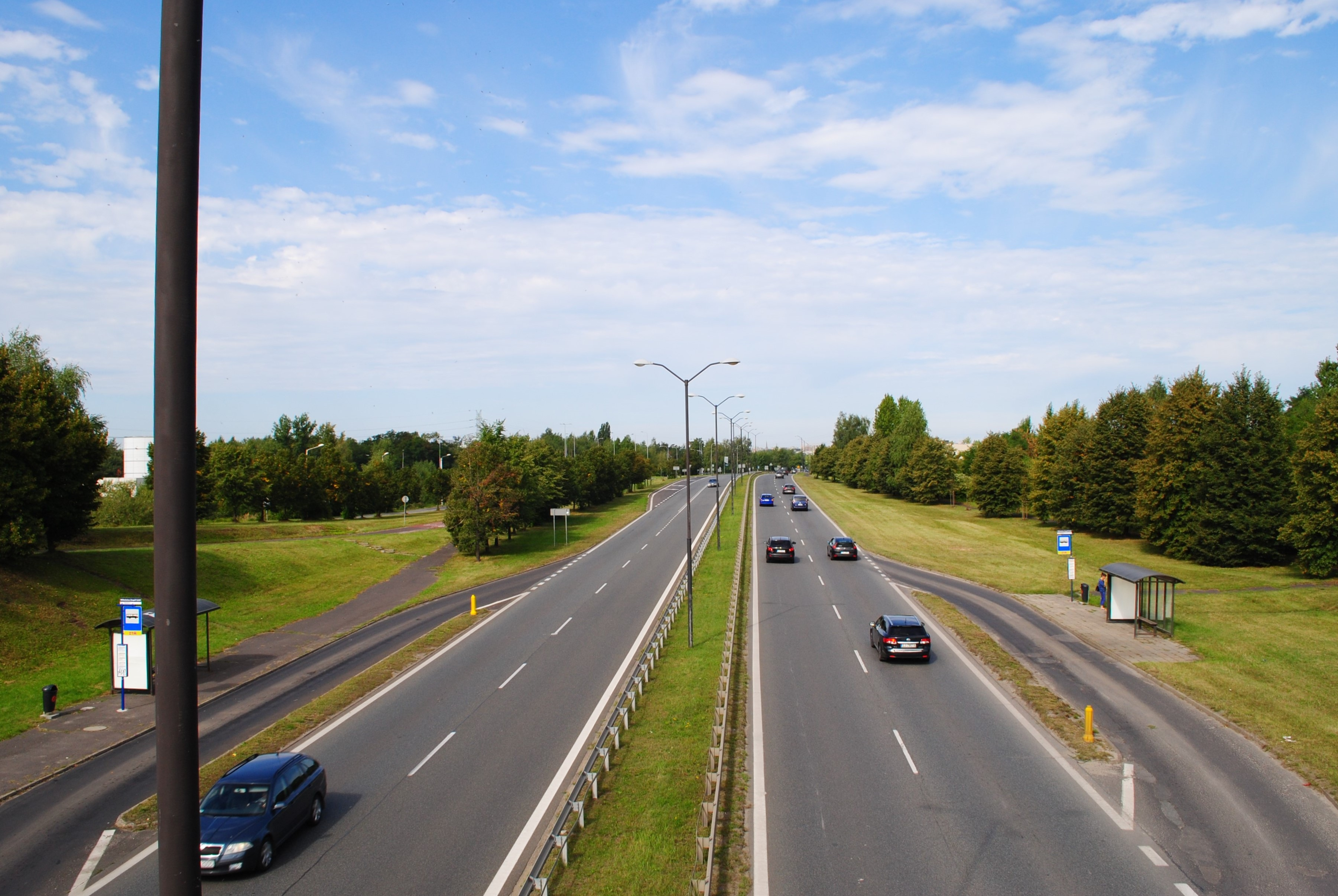
Bagienna Street (DK79) at the height of Szopienicka Street (view to the west)

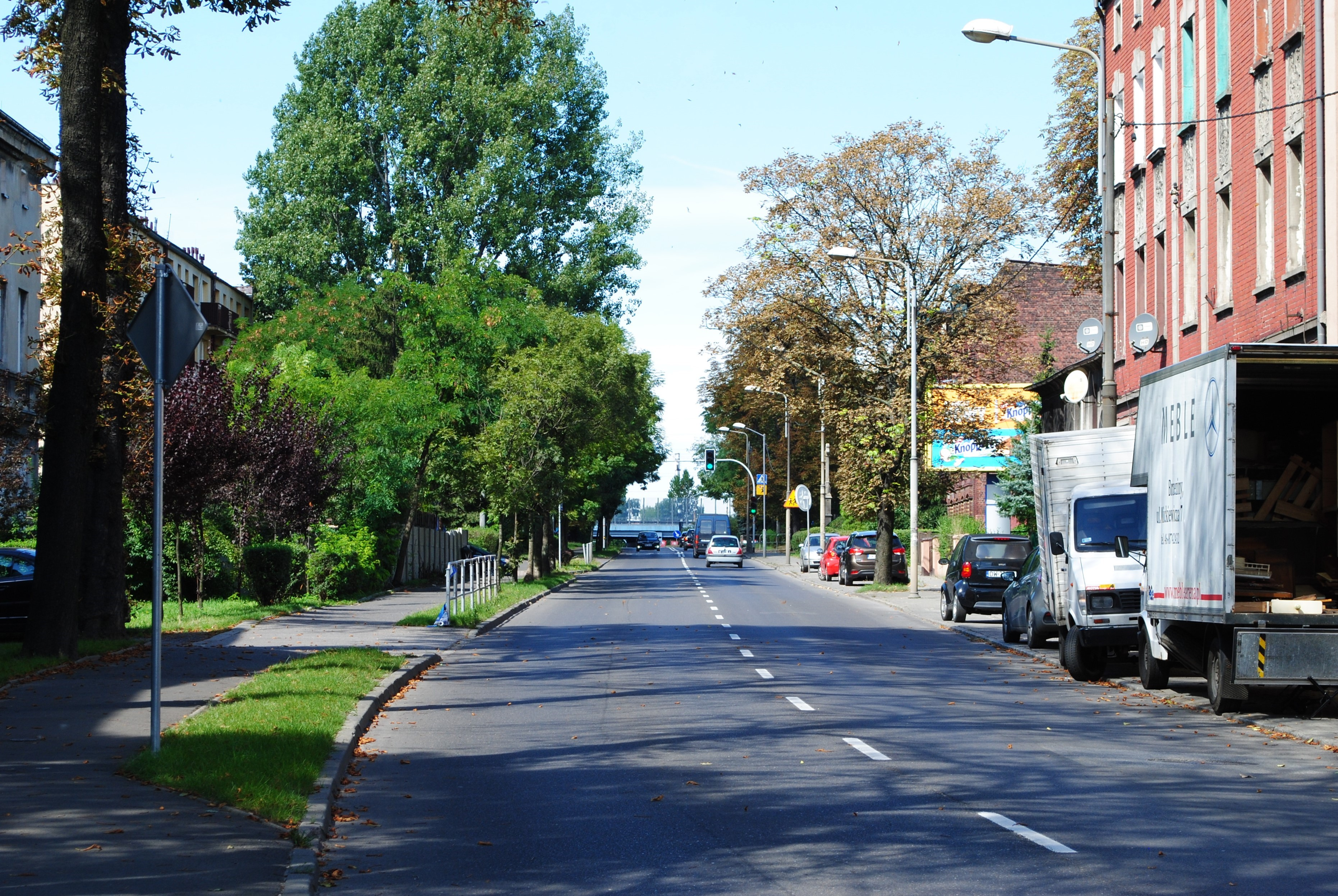
J. Haller Street in Burowiec (view toward Dąbrówka Mała)

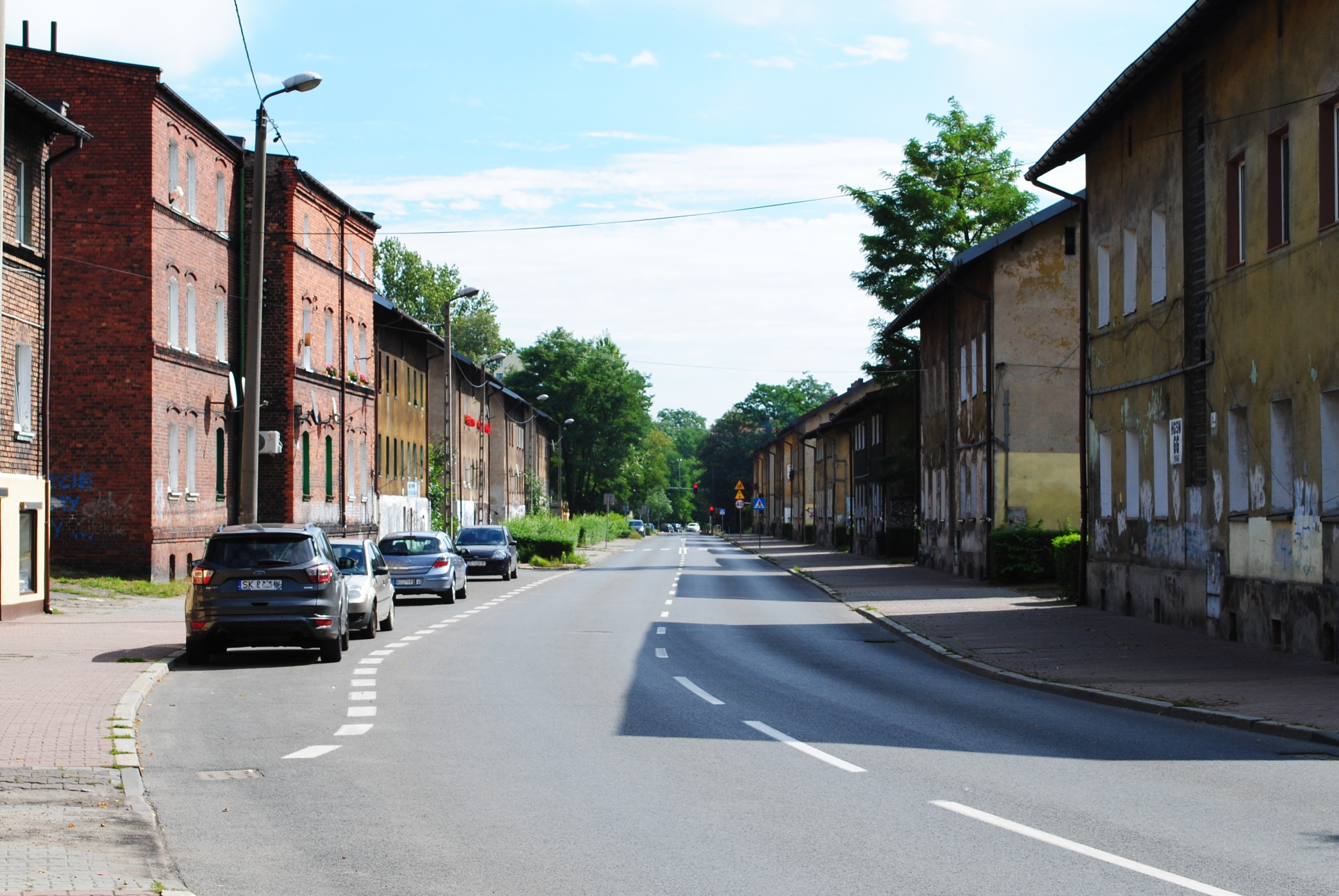
Morawa Street in Szopienice

The district is bordered to the north and south by two major national routes:

- Expressway S86 (Walenty Roździeński Avenue) – a two-lane expressway running from the junction with Murckowska Street to Sosnowiec. It forms a continuation of national road no. 86 and links southward to the A4 motorway via Murckowska Street. The route provides Szopienice-Burowiec with fast connections to expressway S1 in Tychy to the south, as well as to Sosnowiec, Będzin, and Katowice Airport to the north. It features conflict-free, one-way carriageways accessible only at grade-separated interchanges (in the district, an interchange exists at the level of the Castorama store, serving J. Popiełuszko, Haller, and Pod Młynem/Borki streets). Its function is to facilitate rapid travel between distant parts of Katowice or across the Metropolis GZM.
- National road no. 79 (Bagienna and Krakowska streets) – follows an east-west alignment along the southern boundary of the district. Owing to its latitudinal orientation, it serves as an alternative to the A4 motorway. It connects the district westward to Chorzów and Bytom, and eastward to Mysłowice, Jaworzno, Chrzanów, and Kraków.

Internal connectivity within the district, as well as links to the rest of Katowice and higher-order roads, relies primarily on main streets classified as collector roads (class Z) due to their insufficient technical parameters for full arterial status (class G). The main routes include:

- Józef Haller Street – traverses Burowiec; it connects northwestward via an interchange to Walenty Roździeński Avenue and continues north to Dąbrówka Mała, while southeastward it joins Obrońców Westerplatte Street;
- Lwowska Street – a north-south road forming the boundary between Roździeń and Szopienice; southward it links to national road no. 79 and extends further to Janów;
- Obrońców Westerplatte Street – runs through Roździeń; westward it connects the district to Zawodzie. A tram line operates along this street;
- Sosnowiecka Street – passes through the Szopienice-Borki nature and landscape complex; it provides a direct link from Szopienice to Sosnowiec;
- Wiosny Ludów Street – traverses Szopienice in an east-west direction through the central and eastern (Drugie Szopienice) parts of the district. A tram line runs along it, and the street connects Szopienice-Burowiec to Mysłowice.

Other notable roads crossing the district include:

- Herbert Bednorz Street – a local road in Roździeń; originally built to bypass Roździeń development from the south as part of the Szopienice–Katowice route. It runs from Silesian Insurgents Square in the east to the intersection with Obrońców Westerplatte Street in the northwest. Along this street stand the complex of the former Mokrski brothers' brewery and malt house, the Evangelical Church of the Saviour, and the Jacobsen Villa;
- Janusz Korczak Street – a local road in Roździeń. It extends northward to Borki;
- Józefa Kantorówna Street – a local north-south road in Szopienice;
- Morawa Street – a local road running through Roździeń and Szopienice; it encircles the central part of the district from the north. The historic Morawa colony developed along it. The street links Obrońców Westerplatte Street in the west to Sosnowiecka Street in the east, continuing toward Sosnowiec;
- Wandy Street – a local east-west road in Burowiec and Roździeń; it connects J. Haller Street with J. Korczak Street.

The remaining streets, primarily in the Dąbrówka Mała area, function as local and access roads, serving individual structural units, housing estates, and other facilities. The main intersection of the district's important internal roads – Obrońców Westerplatte, Wiosny Ludów, Lwowska, and H. Bednorz streets – is Silesian Insurgents Square, which also functions as a local commercial and service centre for Szopienice and Roździeń.

In terms of connectivity to other macroregions of Katowice, Szopienice-Burowiec (together with Nikiszowiec) has good links with neighbouring districts and the city centre, facilitated by Bagienna Street and Walenty Roździeński Avenue. However, connections to Ligota and Brynów are the weakest among Katowice districts. No alternative route exists to relieve the Bagienna–Walenty Roździeński Avenue corridor from Szopienice.

Walenty Roździeński Avenue is among the highest-traffic roads in Katowice. According to traffic surveys conducted in September 2007, during afternoon peak hours at the entry to Katowice, 6,114 vehicles passed along this route (84.9% passenger cars and 8.1% delivery vehicles). Comparative figures for other entry roads into Szopienice-Burowiec from neighbouring cities were 771 vehicles on Sosnowiecka Street, 322 on Wiosny Ludów Street, and 1,740 on Krakowska Street. In 2007, the Obrońców Westerplatte–Wiosny Ludów corridor (from the railway crossing) was identified as one of the road sections where capacity had been exhausted.

=== Railway infrastructure ===
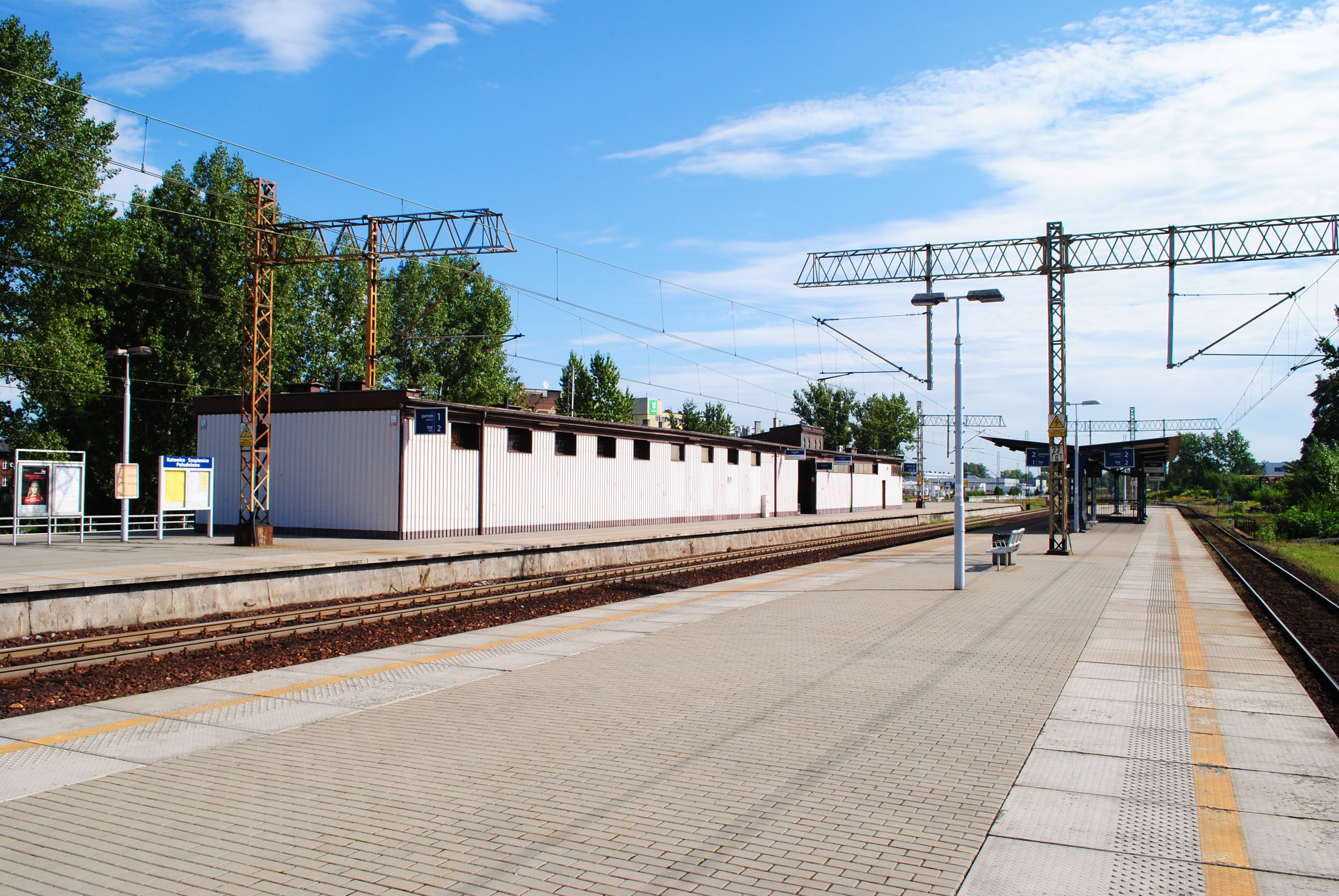
Katowice Szopienice Południowe railway station

The first railway serving Roździeń and Szopienice was opened on 3 October 1846 (now part of Oświęcim–Katowice railway). It formed part of the Wrocław–Mysłowice railway, constructed by the Upper Silesian Railway company. The same company later completed a connecting branch to Sosnowiec, which entered regular service on 24 August 1859 (now part of Warszawa Zachodnia-Katowice line). The Szopienice Południowe railway station was established on this route in 1870 (today the Katowice Szopienice Południowe railway station).

A separate connection was added through the Right Bank Oder Railway, which linked Tarnowskie Góry with Pszczyna. This railway opened on 15 November 1868, and a dedicated station was built within the present-day Szopienice-Burowiec area (now Katowice Szopienice Północne railway station).

Narrow-gauge railways once served Szopienice for both freight and passenger transport. In 1906, the Georg von Giesches Erben concern obtained a concession to construct a private narrow-gauge line. On 6 January 1914, the Regional Railway Directorate authorised the start of passenger services. The resulting railway connected Giszowiec with the Albert (Wojciech) shaft in Szopienice. Passenger operations most likely began in 1916. Locally nicknamed the Balkan, the railway offered free travel and, at its height, operated 28 trains on weekdays and 21 on non-working days. After World War II, the railway was electrified. It was finally closed on 31 December 1977.

=== Public municipal transport ===
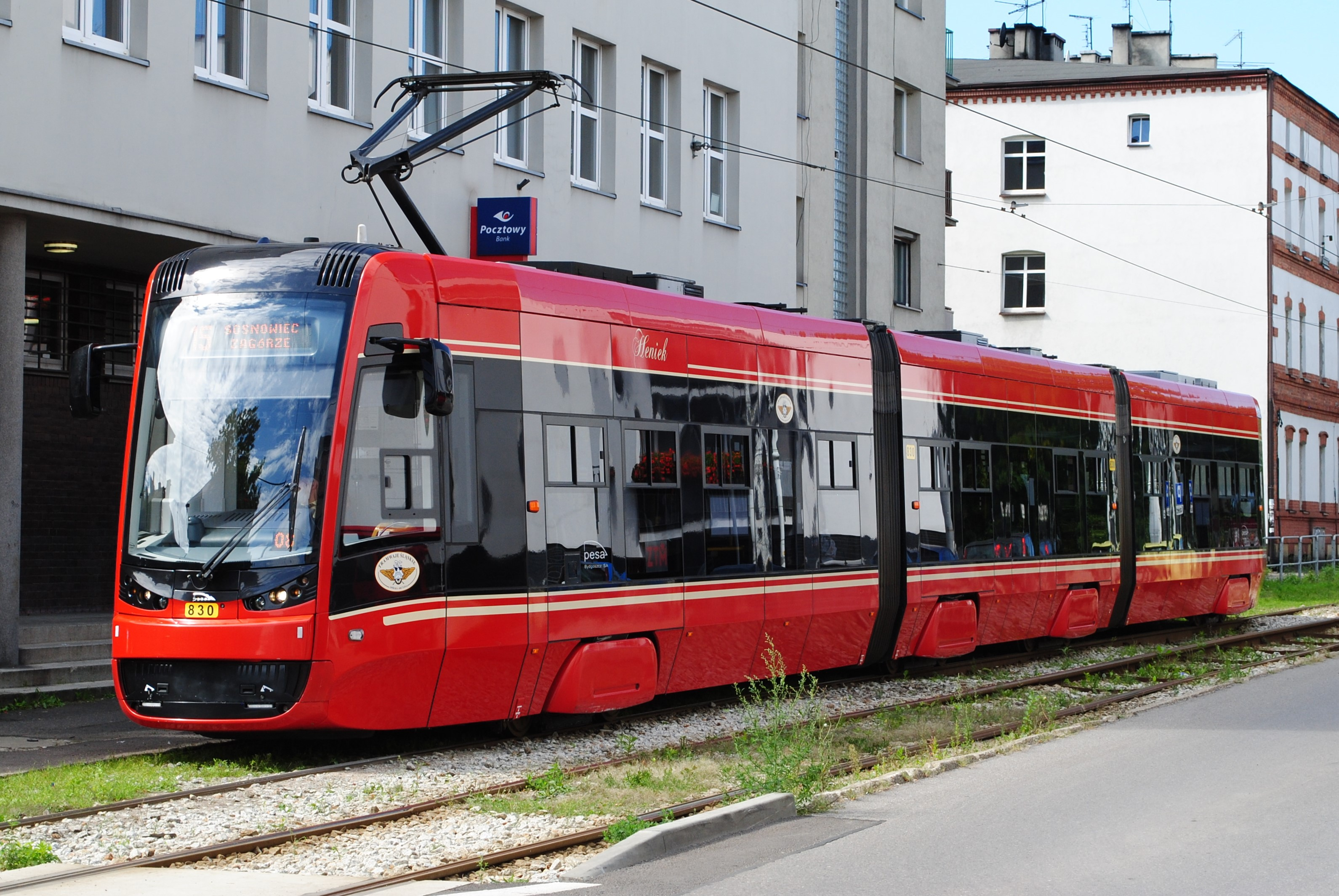
Pesa Twist 2012N tram on Obrońców Westerplatte Street in Roździeń

As of November 2020, public transport services in Szopienice-Burowiec are coordinated by the Metropolitan Transport Authority, which oversees both bus and tram operations. In Szopienice and Roździeń (excluding the Wilhelmina area), there are 14 stations. The Szopienice Kościół station is served by nine bus lines (including one night service) and four regular tram lines.

Bus routes provide connections to the majority of Katowice's districts as well as to neighbouring cities: Mysłowice, Chorzów, Siemianowice Śląskie, and Mikołów. Tram services link the district to Brynów, Mysłowice, Sosnowiec, and Chorzów, passing through the Katowice districts of Zawodzie, Śródmieście, and Załęże. The six-bay Burowiec station, located at Hilary Krzysztofiak Square, is served by four regular tram lines and seven bus lines (including one night service).

Tram traffic in Burowiec, Roździeń, and Szopienice began in 1900, when the Upper Silesian Steam Trams company obtained a concession to build a route from Królewska Huta through Hajduki (now Chorzów Batory), Katowice, Szopienice, and Mysłowice. The line was opened on 31 October of that year.

== Architecture and urban planning ==
=== Urban development ===
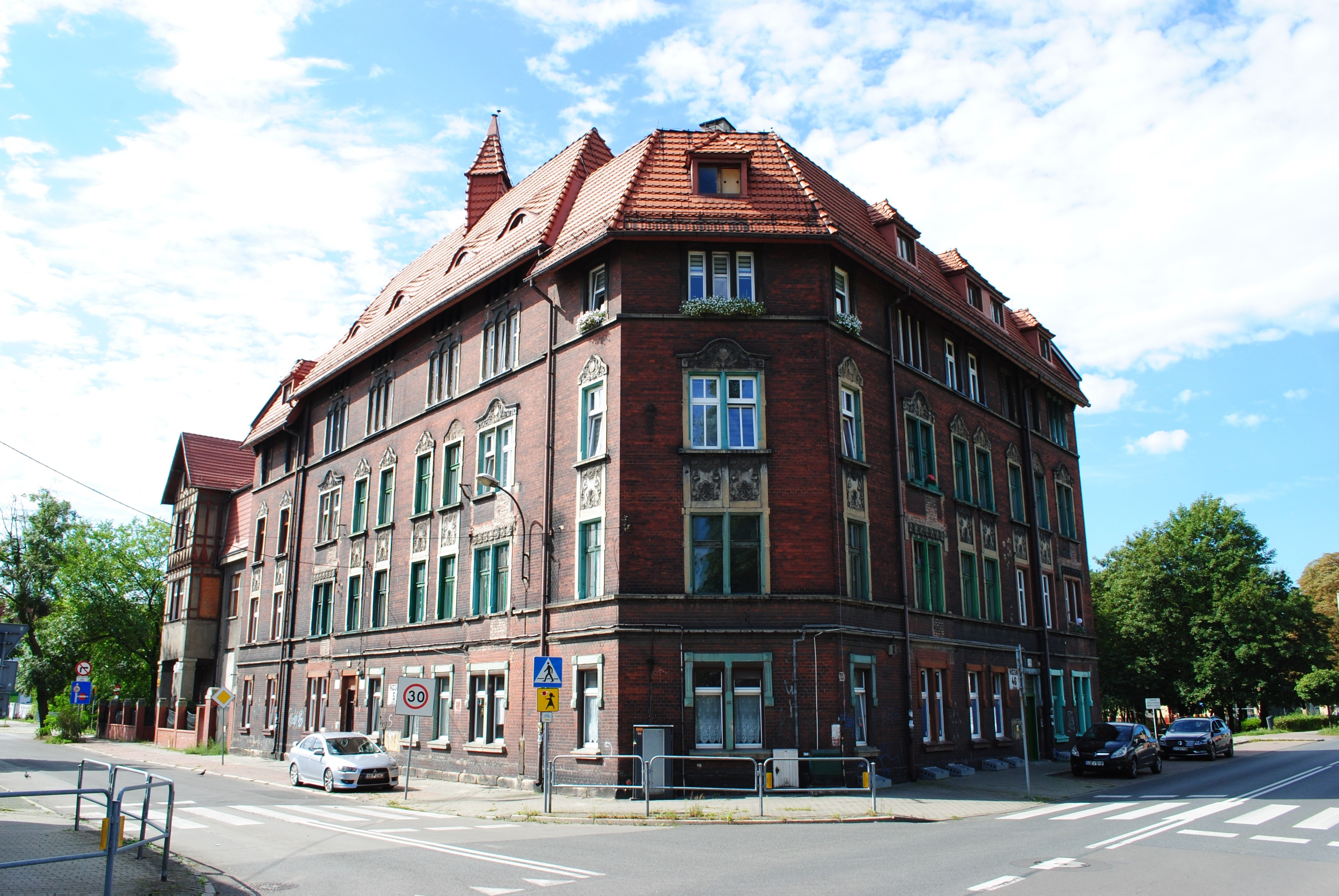
Tenement at the corner of Morawa and Brynica streets

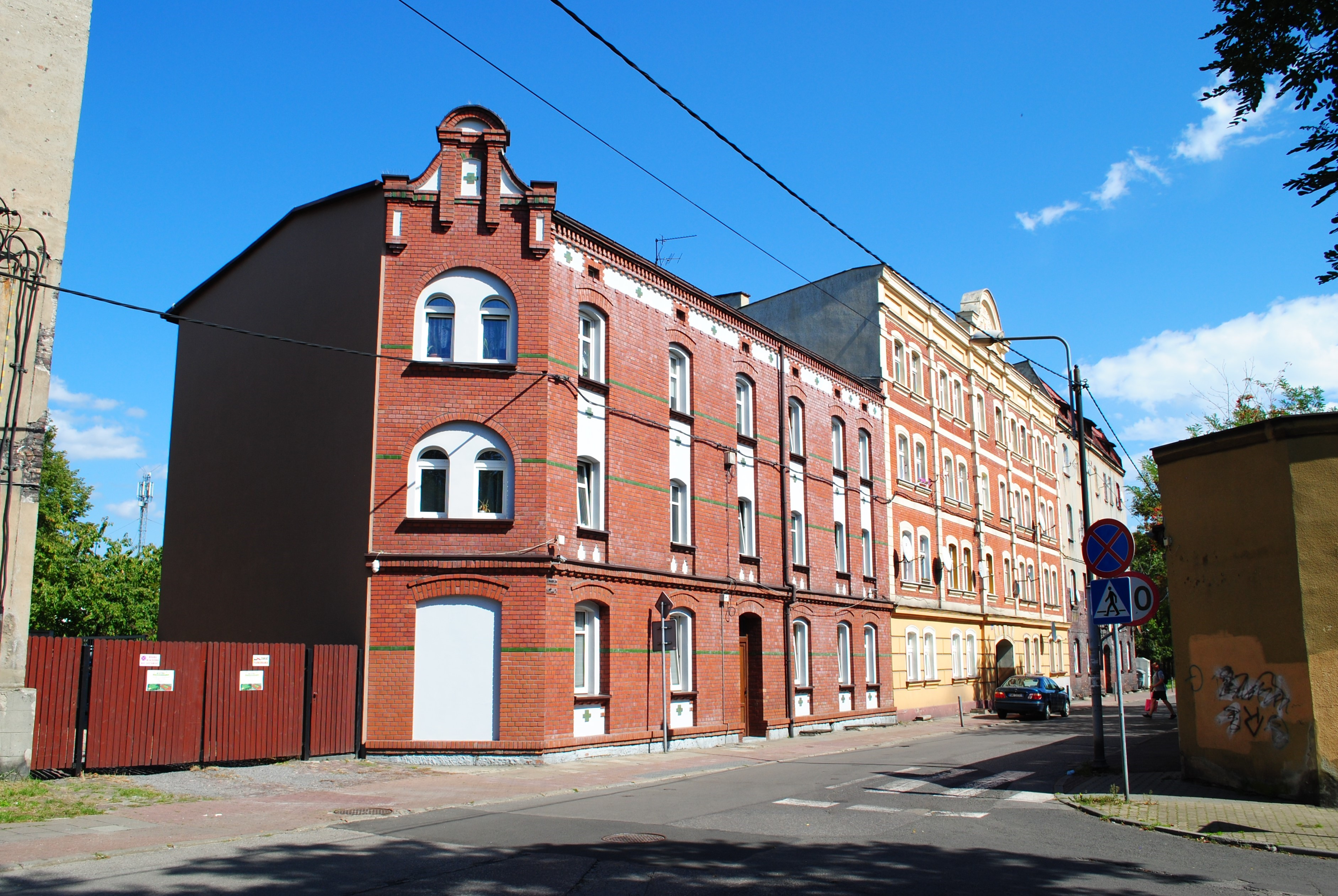
Tenements on Wandy Street

The built-up fabric of Roździeń, Szopienice, and the Burowiec area along J. Haller and Wandy streets dates predominantly to the turn of the 19th and 20th centuries. A number of buildings from this period are entered in the Registry of Cultural Property. The oldest surviving structures in Roździeń are concentrated in the western section of Morawa Street, along H. Bednorz Street, Obrońców Westerplatte Street, and in the Borki area. In Szopienice, early development survives around Powstańców Śląskich Square, along the western section of Wiosny Ludów Street and in Drugie Szopienice, on J. Kantorówna Street, at the intersection of Wiosny Ludów and Przelotowa streets, and in the eastern part of Morawa Street. By 1922, much of the present-day urban layout had already been established.

During the interwar period, construction activity was limited to individual buildings, including the structure at 17 Obrońców Westerplatte Street, erected between 1931 and 1932 (now housing the Katowice 14 Post Office), and the former Gmina Szopienice town hall on Wiosny Ludów Street, completed in 1928.

Between 1945 and 1989, new development occurred mainly in Burowiec, along the western section of Obrońców Westerplatte Street, and in the area of Wiosny Ludów Street up to its intersection with Przelotowa Street. Housing estates constructed during this period include the Franciszka Rybki estate on Morawa Street (mid-1970s) and the Przedwiośnie estate in Burowiec (1960s–1970s).

Since 1989, new construction has been relatively sparse. Post-1989 additions include three four-storey residential buildings on Obrońców Westerplatte Street in Roździeń, completed in November 2017, the housing development on W. Anders Street in Borki, finished by 2013, and halls on the Unilever factory site, the Selgros store, and various individual buildings in Szopienice.

=== Monuments ===
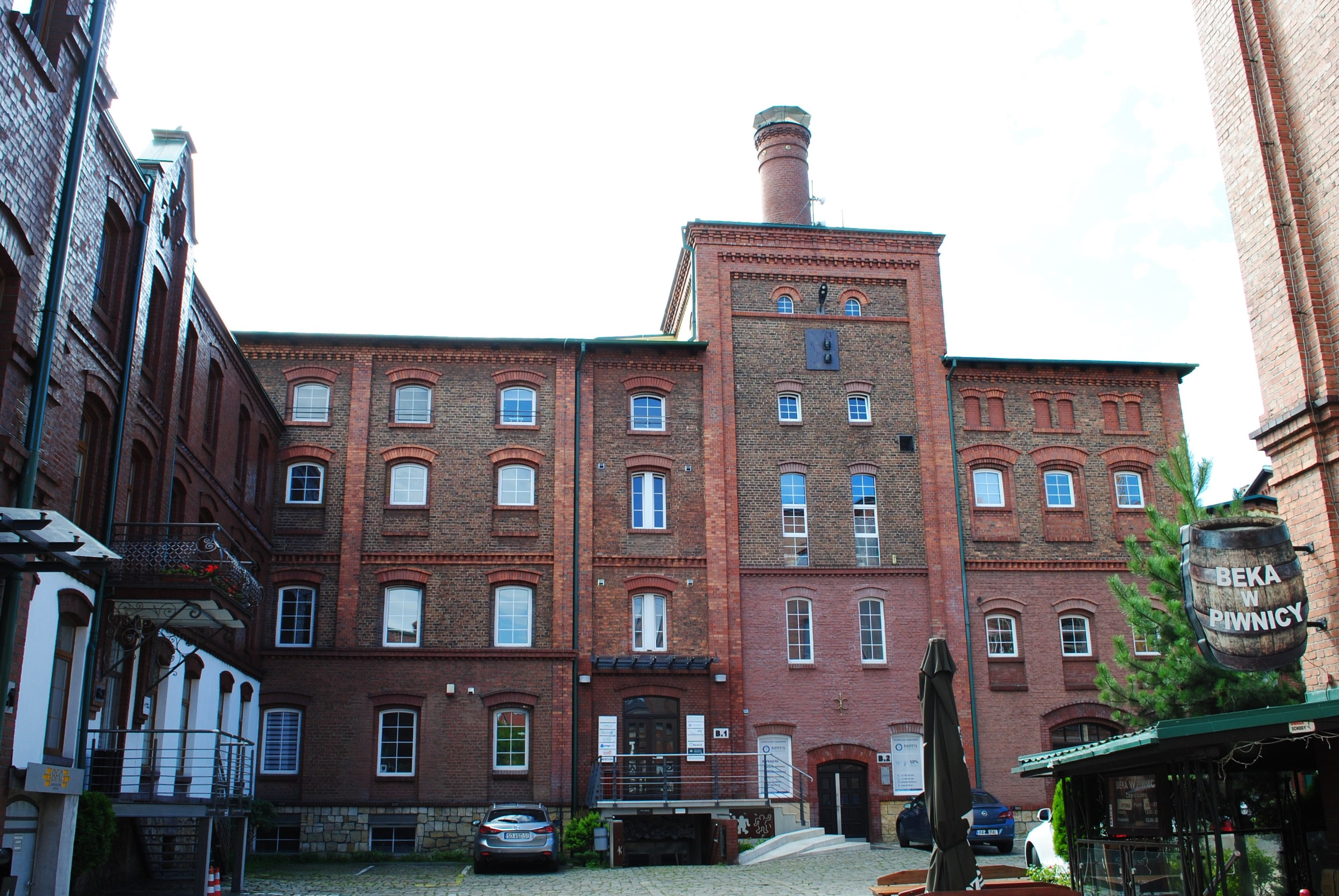
Complex of the former Mokrski brewery on Obrońców Westerplatte Street

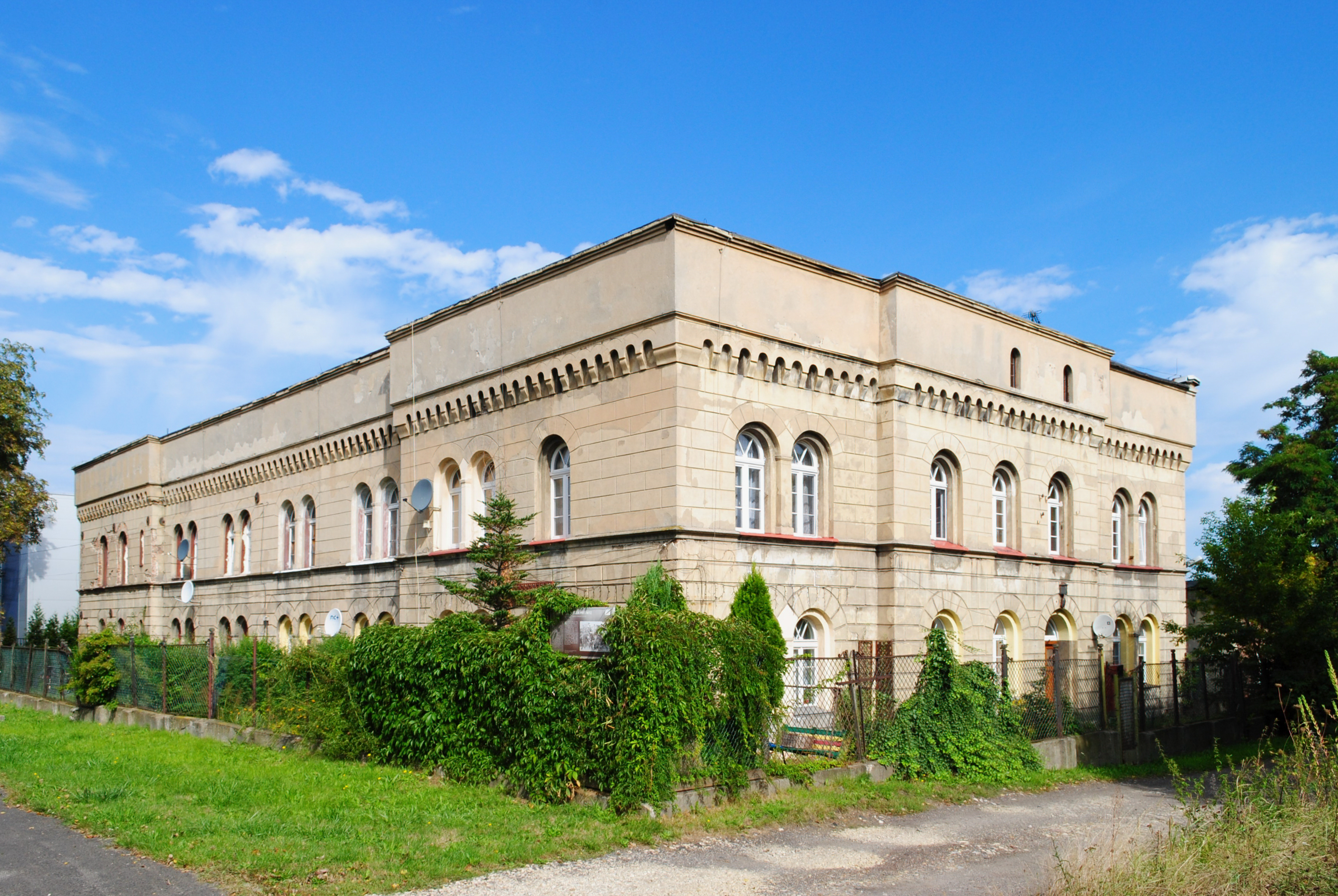
Prittwitz Castle on Krakowska Street

The following objects in Szopienice-Burowiec are listed in the Registry of Cultural Property:

- Complex of the Church of St. Hedwig of Silesia (3 Silesian Insurgents Square) – inscribed on 30 December 1994 (reg. no. A/1557/94; currently A/1235/23). The complex comprises the Gothic Revival parish church built between 1885 and 1887, the Gothic Revival Chapel of the Garden of Gethsemane from 1903 (designed by Ludwig Schneider), and a group of sculptures (Adoration of the Cross and Pietà) dating from the turn of the 19th and 20th centuries;
- Evangelical-Augsburg Church of the Saviour (20 Herbert Bednorz Street) – inscribed on 30 December 2002 (reg. no. A/76/02). The listing covers the Gothic Revival church (designed by architect H. Ritschel, built between 1898 and 1901 of clinker brick) together with its immediate surroundings within the plot (excluding the fence). Adjacent historic structures include the former Graefe pharmacy and the former villa of Dr. Staub; the Gothic Revival parsonage (built between 1907 and 1908) stood until its destruction in a gas explosion in January 2023;
- Administrative building (Jacobsen's villa) (60 H. Bednorz Street) – inscribed on 17 June 1982 (reg. no. A/1042/22). The brick-built villa from the early 20th century is protected within the boundaries of its fence;
- Complex of the former Mokrski brothers' brewery and malthouse (2a–6 H. Bednorz Street) – inscribed on 13 November 1992 (reg. no. A/1506/92). Protection encompasses the entire complex, including buildings, spatial layout, greenery, and communication routes;
- Building of the Jan Długosz High School (2 Lwowska Street) – inscribed on 30 December 1994 (reg. no. 1560/94). Constructed around 1905 in Gothic Revival style to a design by municipal builder Kunze of Opole; during the Third Silesian Uprising it served as headquarters for Wojciech Korfanty and the Supreme Civil and Military Authority;
- Complex of the former metallurgical hospital (27 Janusz Korczak Street) – inscribed on 14 February 2012 (reg. no. A/368/12). Includes the main hospital building (currently disused), gatehouse, park with diverse tree species (poplar, weeping willows, birches, horse chestnuts, ashes, thujas, junipers, spruces, firs), and fence. Built in brick historicism with modern elements for the Georg von Giesches Erben concern;
- Secessionist water tower (near J. Korczak Street) – inscribed on 29 October 1990 together with plot no. 1246/31 (reg. no. 14182/90); constructed in 1912;
- Modernist detached villa (20 Józefa Kantorówna Street) – inscribed on 16 October 1995 (reg. no. A/574/2019); dating from the first decade of the 20th century;
- Prittwitz Castle (81–83 Krakowska Street) – inscribed on 7 July 2020 (reg. no. A/672/2020); late 19th century;
- Tenement (14 H. Bednorz Street) – reg. no. A/1165/23;
- Former Szopienice town hall (24 Wiosny Ludów Street) – inscribed on 2 July 2020 (reg. no. A/668/2020); built between 1927 and 1928; now used as a health centre;
- Complex of the Katowice Szopienice Północne railway station – inscribed on 22 March 2022 (reg. no. A/948/2022). Located on cadastral plots no. 1420/8 and 1421/8 (map sheet 3, precinct Roździeń); includes the class I railway station building (1 Ogród Dworcowy Square) and the former customs office building (1a Ogród Dworcowy Square).

== Culture, sport and recreation ==
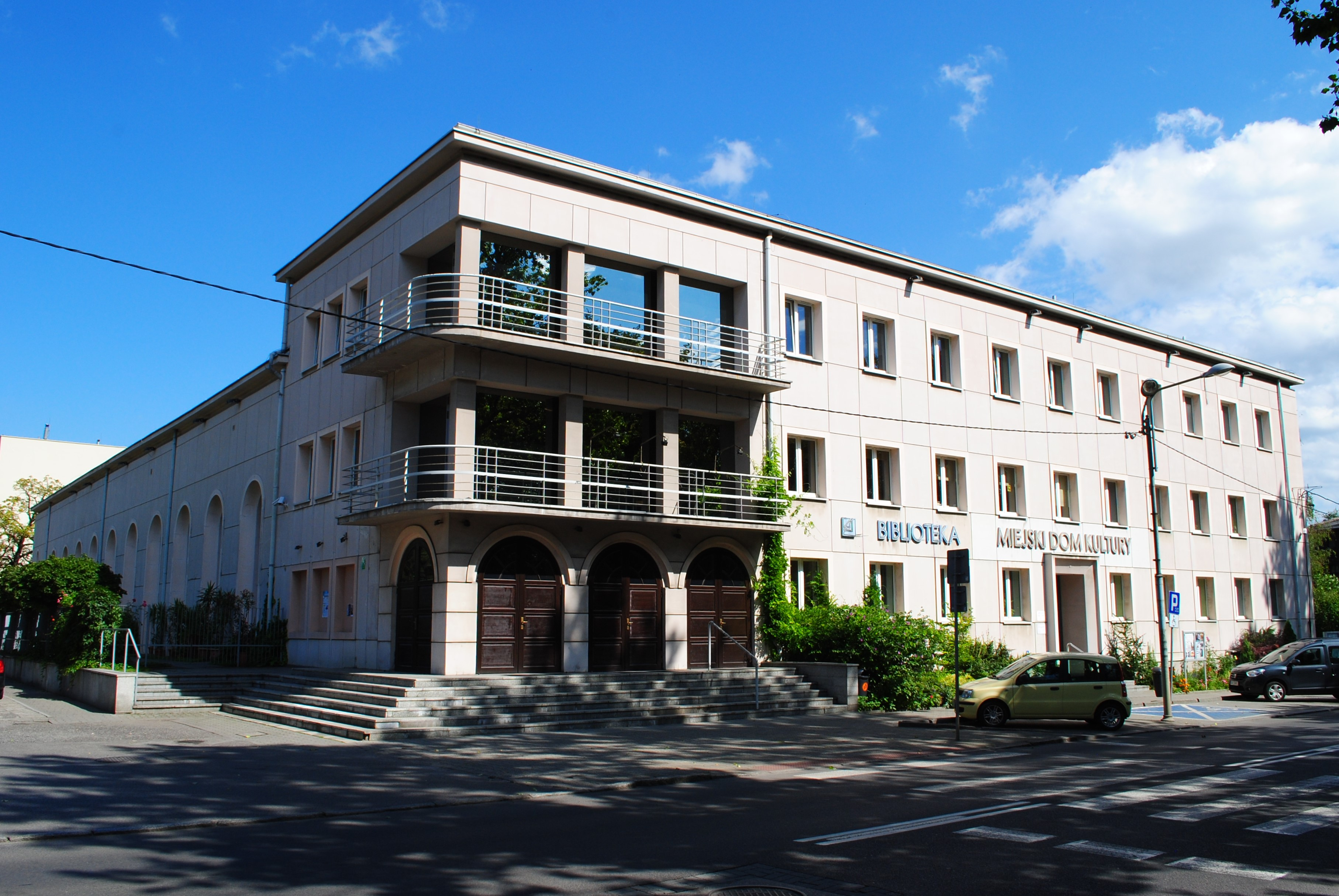
Headquarters of the Szopienice-Giszowiec Municipal House of Culture and Branch No. 36 of the Katowice Municipal Public Library on J. Haller Street

The cultural and sports institutions located in Szopienice-Burowiec include:

- Szopienice-Giszowiec Municipal House of Culture in Katowice (28 J. Haller Street);
- Branch No. 1 of the Szopienice-Giszowiec Municipal House of Culture in Katowice (10 Obrońców Westerplatte Street);
- Branch No. 19 of the Katowice Municipal Public Library (10 Obrońców Westerplatte Street);
- Branch No. 36 of the Katowice Municipal Public Library (28 J. Haller Street).

== Education ==
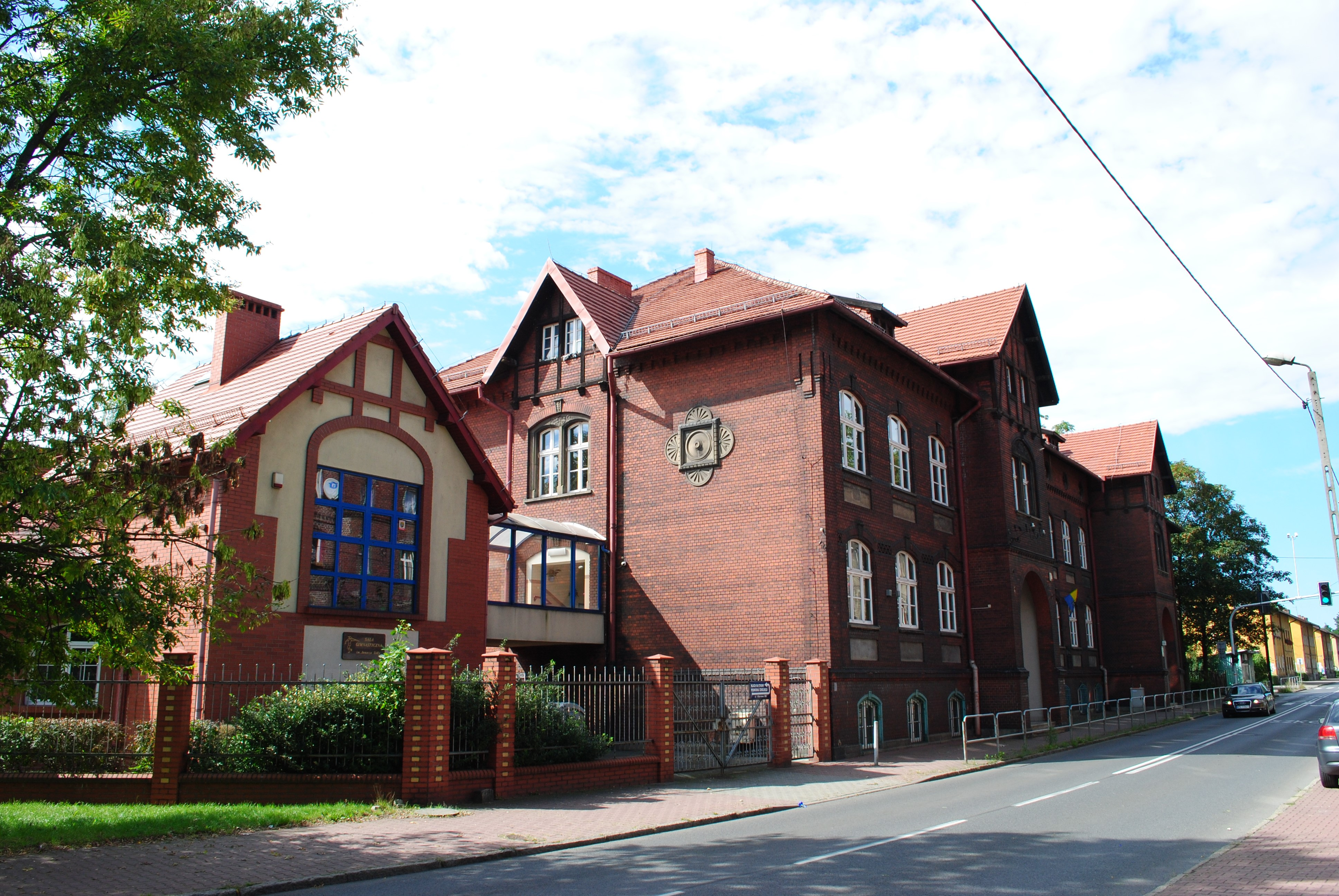
Maria Skłodowska-Curie Elementary School on Morawa Street

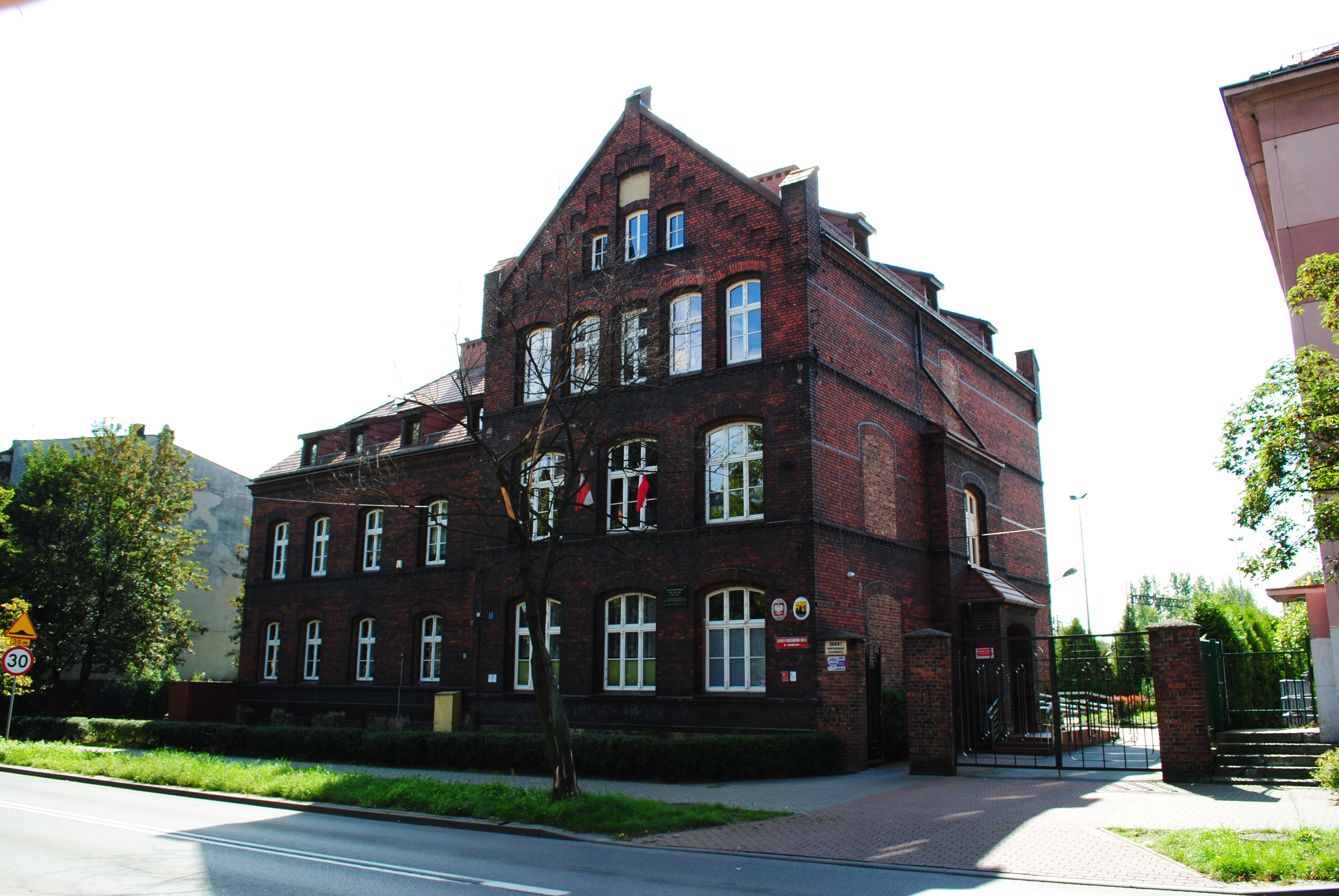
Building of Special Primary School No. 55 on H. Bednorz Street

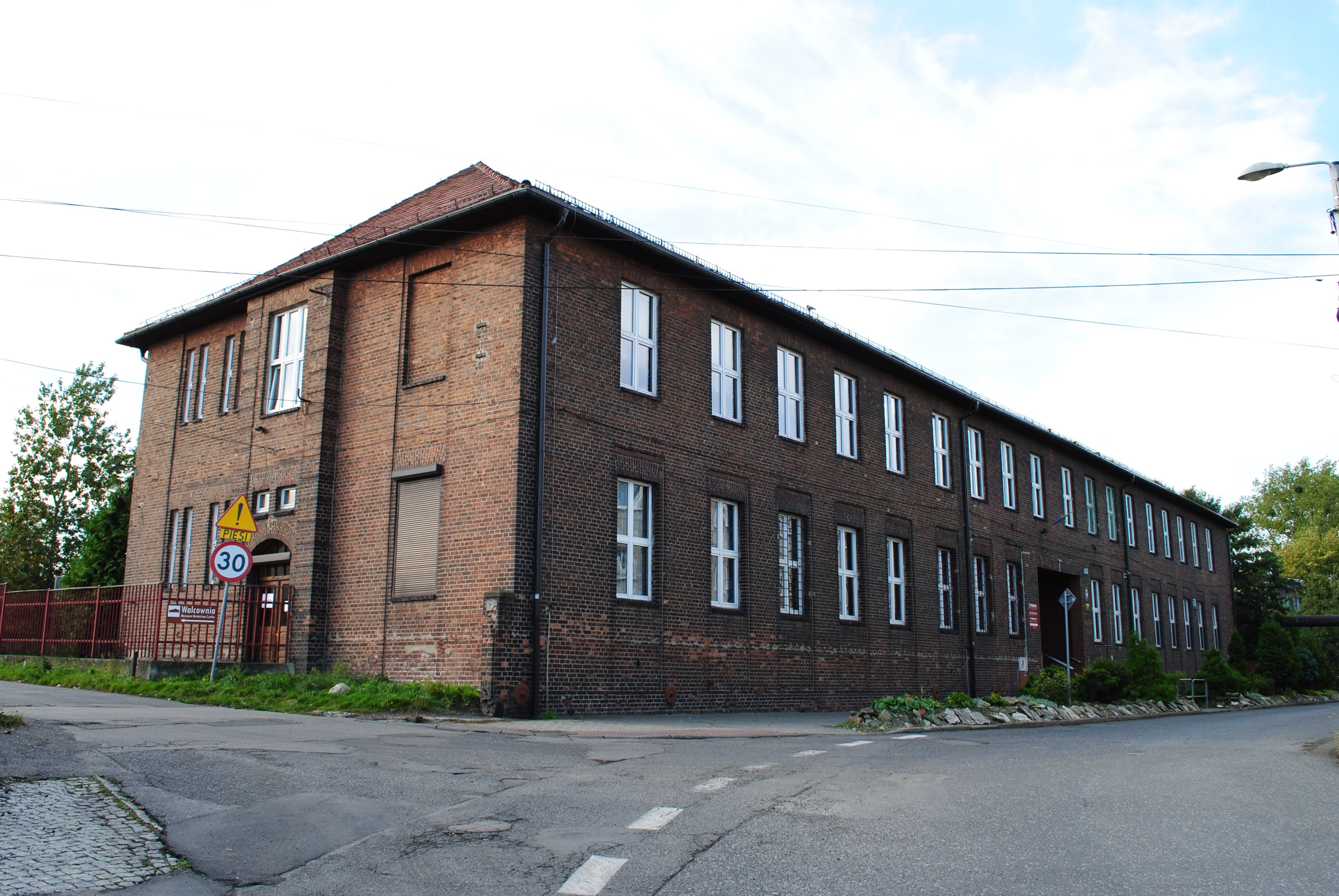
Complex of Gustaw Morcinek Gastronomic Schools on Roździeńska Street

As of October 2020, the following educational establishments operate in Szopienice-Burowiec:

- Municipal Nursery in Katowice – Branch (1 Ciesielska Street);
- Municipal Kindergarten No. 56 in Katowice (17 Wiosny Ludów Street);
- Municipal Kindergarten No. 60 in Katowice (60 J. Haller Street);
- Municipal Kindergarten No. 65 in Katowice (1 Ciesielska Street);
- Majka Jeżowska Municipal Kindergarten with Integrated Branches in Katowice (50 Brynicy Street);
- Primary School No. 42 in Katowice (22 Wiosny Ludów Street);
- Maria Skłodowska-Curie Elementary School in Katowice (86 Morawa Street);
- Kornel Makuszyński Elementary School in Katowice (11 J. Korczak Street);
- Special Elementary School No. 55 in Katowice (13 H. Bednorz Street);
- Kuźnica Elementary School for Boys (14 Deszczowa Street);
- Jan Długosz High School in Katowice (2 Lwowska Street);
- In Altum High School (14 Deszczowa Street);
- Complex of Gustaw Morcinek Gastronomic Schools in Katowice (25 Roździeńska Street), comprising:
  - Technical Secondary School No. 3;
  - Vocational School I Degree No. 2;
  - Vocational School II Degree No. 2;
- Complex of J. Rymer Food Industry Schools in Katowice (15 H. Bednorz Street), comprising:
  - Technical Secondary School No. 10;
  - Vocational School I Degree No. 7;
- Complex of Bolesław Prus Commercial Schools in Katowice (60 J. Haller Street), comprising:
  - Technical Secondary School No. 5;
  - Vocational School I Degree No. 3.

== Religion ==
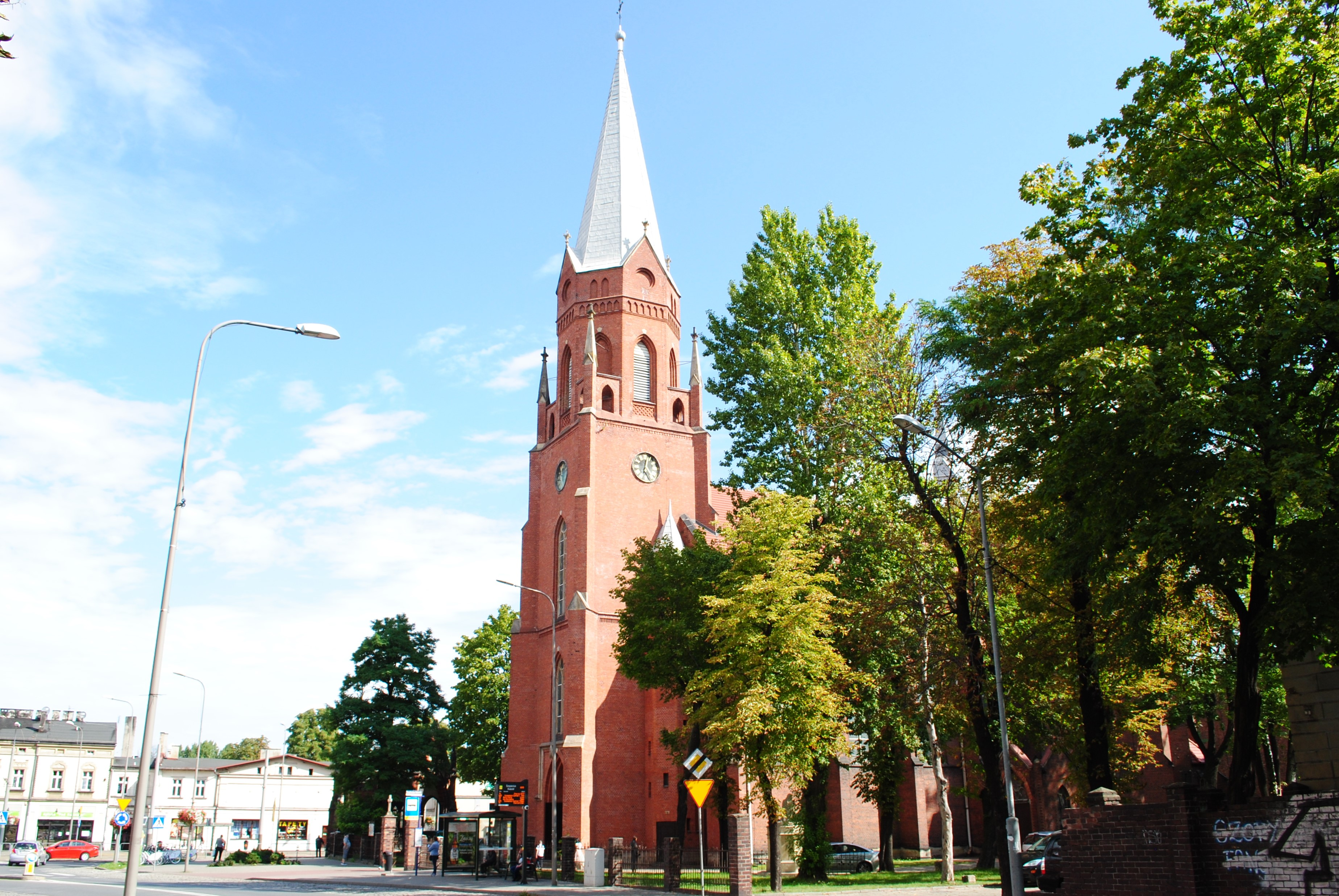
Church of St. Hedwig of Silesia in Szopienice (2020)

The following religious communities maintain a presence in Szopienice-Burowiec:

- Roman Catholic Parish of St. Hedwig of Silesia (3 Silesian Insurgents Square); the parish administers a cemetery on Brynicy Street covering 3.96 ha;
- Roman Catholic Parish of Our Lady of Perpetual Help (25 Siewna Street);
- Evangelical-Augsburg Parish of the Saviour (20 H. Bednorza Street); the parish administers a cemetery on A. Kocur Street covering 0.77 ha;
- Heart of the Metropolis Pentecostal Church (2a–6 H. Bednorz Street, building D).

== Public safety ==
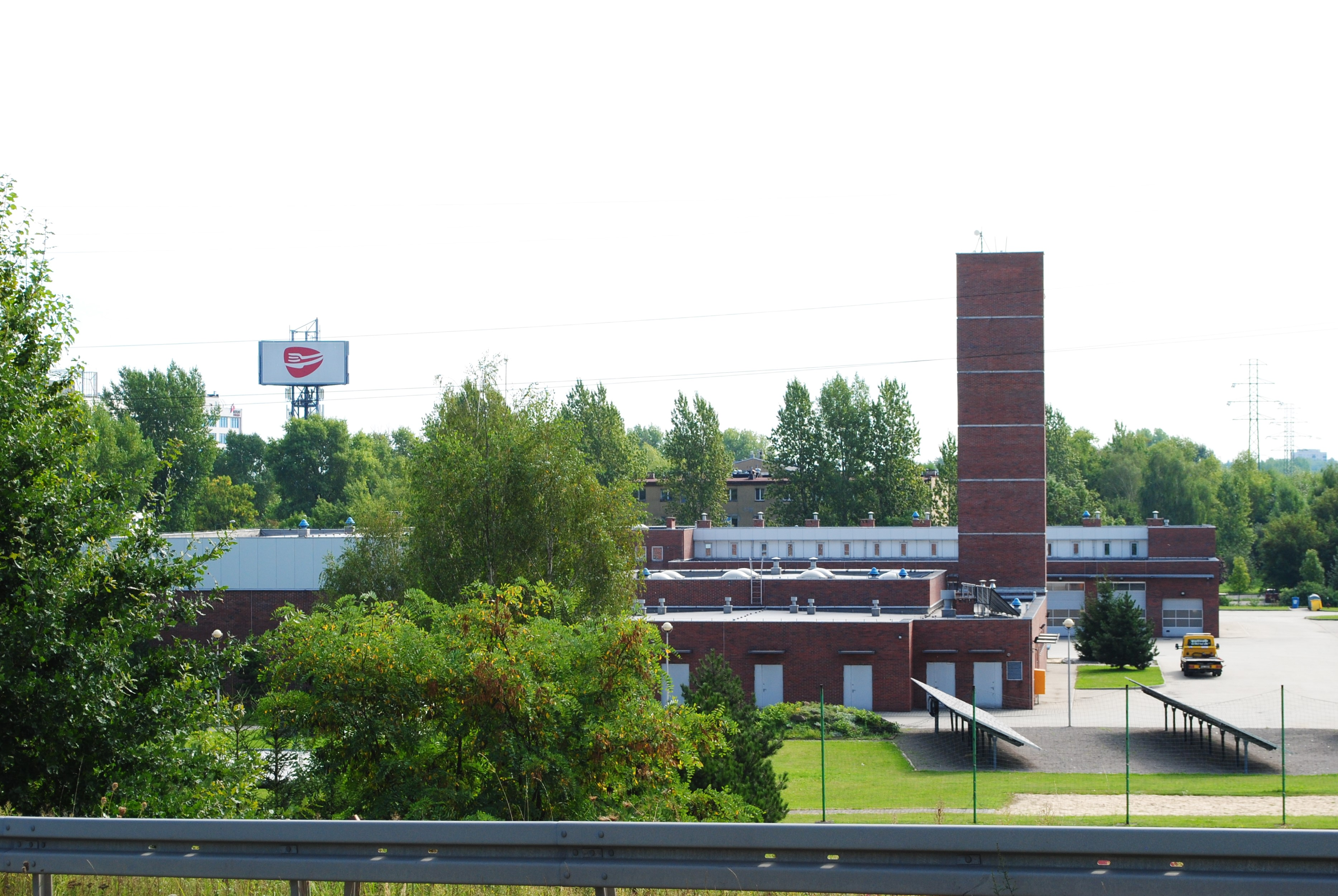
Rescue and Firefighting Unit No. I of the State Fire Service in Katowice on Krakowska Street

According to 2007 data, Szopienice-Burowiec ranked as the 20th safest district in Katowice (out of 22) in terms of the crime rate coefficient, recording 3.45 crimes per 100 residents (city average: 3.08). Between 2004 and 2007, the crime rate declined from 4.75 per 100 residents. In 2007, 43 traffic accidents were recorded in the district.

Public safety infrastructure includes:

- Rescue and Firefighting Unit No. I of the State Fire Service in Katowice (130 Krakowska Street);
- 5th Police Station in Katowice (7 Lwowska Street), which serves the district.

As of October 2020, the following healthcare facilities operate in Szopienice-Burowiec:

- Szopienice Medical Center (24 Wiosny Ludów Street);
- ATUT Non-Public Healthcare Facility (19a Wiosny Ludów Street);
- St. John Paul II Geriatric Hospital (31 Morawa Street);
- ATUT Non-Public Healthcare Facility (19a Wiosny Ludów Street);
- Dr. Krzysztof Czuma Psychiatry Center in Katowice (27 J. Korczak Street);
- BMed Dental Office (64b J. Haller Street);
- WAMED Dental Center (2a Pogodna Street).

== Notable people ==
- Hilary Krzysztofiak (1926–1979), Polish painter, graphic artist and set designer
- Piotr Libera (b. 1951), Roman Catholic bishop
- Jolanta Wadowska-Król (1939-2023), Polish paediatrician

== Gallery ==
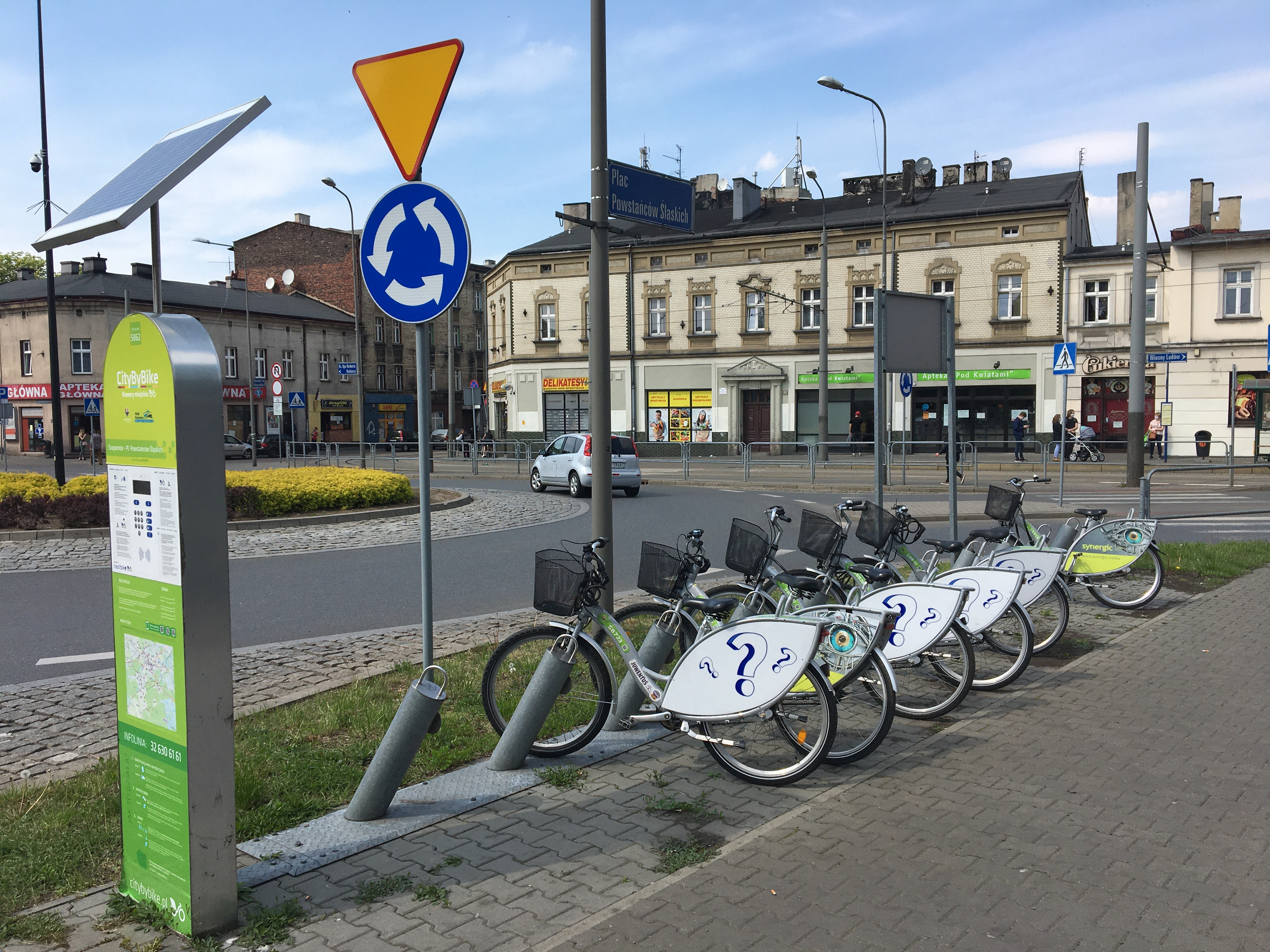
Plac Powstańców Śląskich ("Silesian Insurgents' Square")

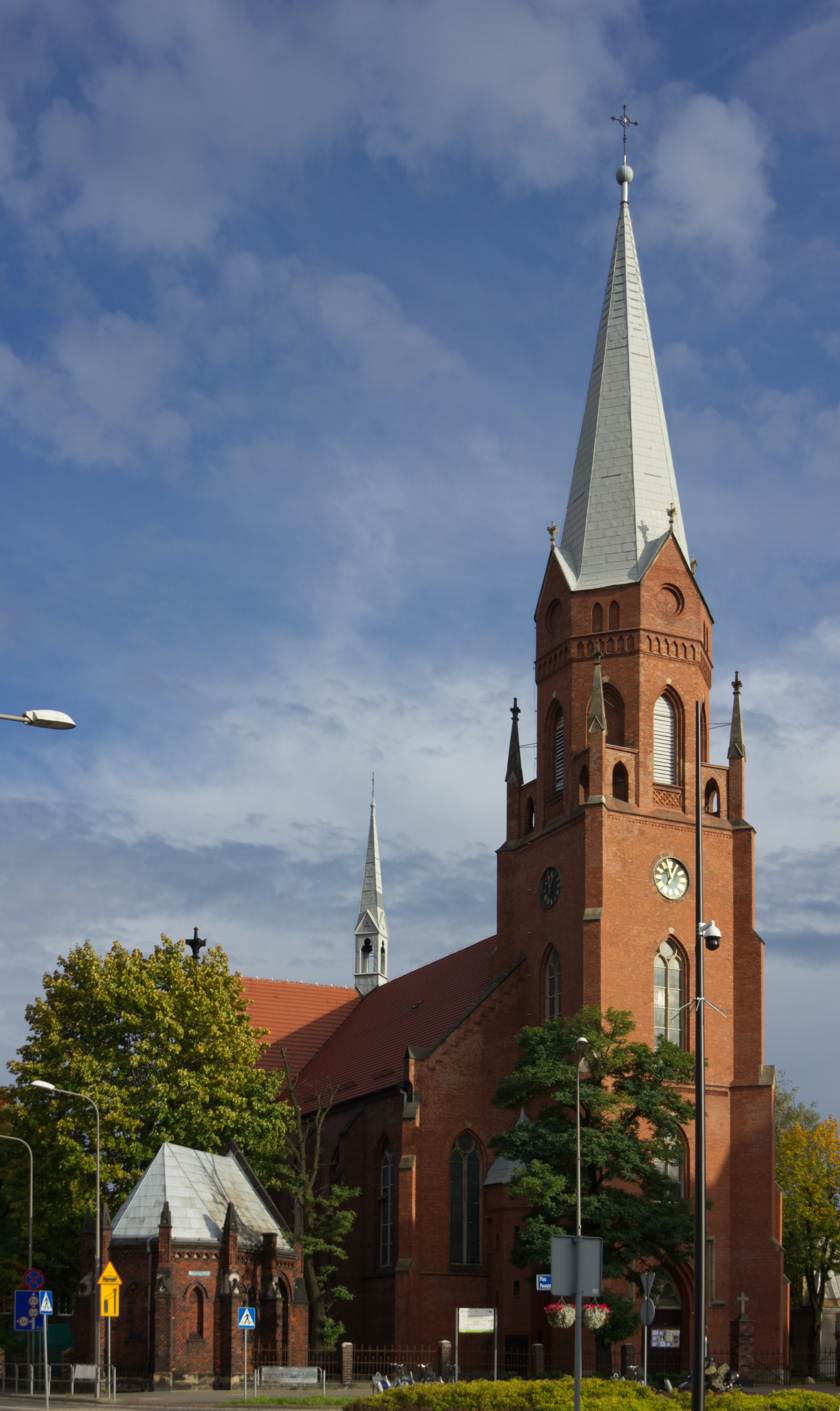
Church of St. Hedwig, High Duchess consort of Poland

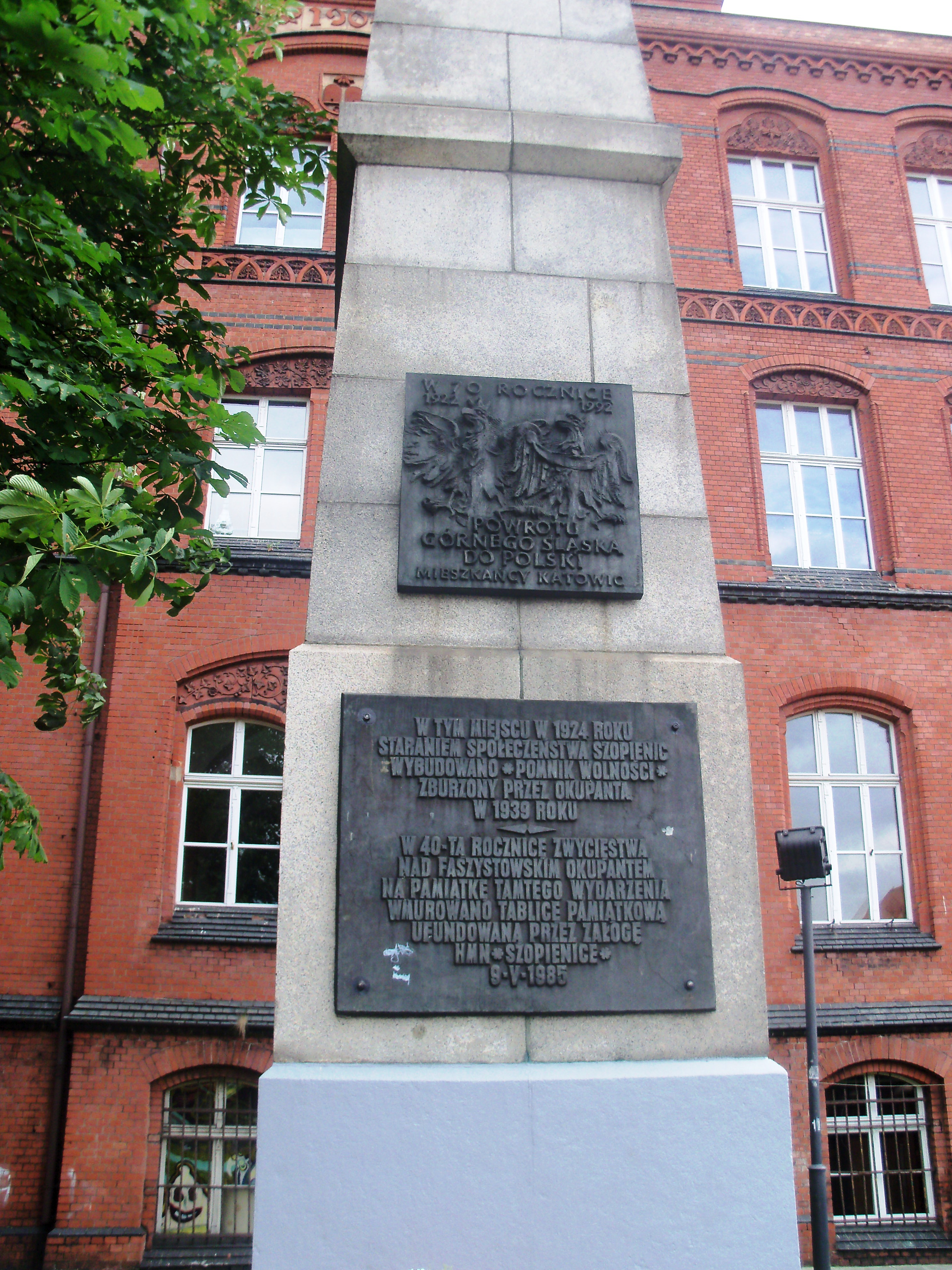
Silesian Uprisings Monument

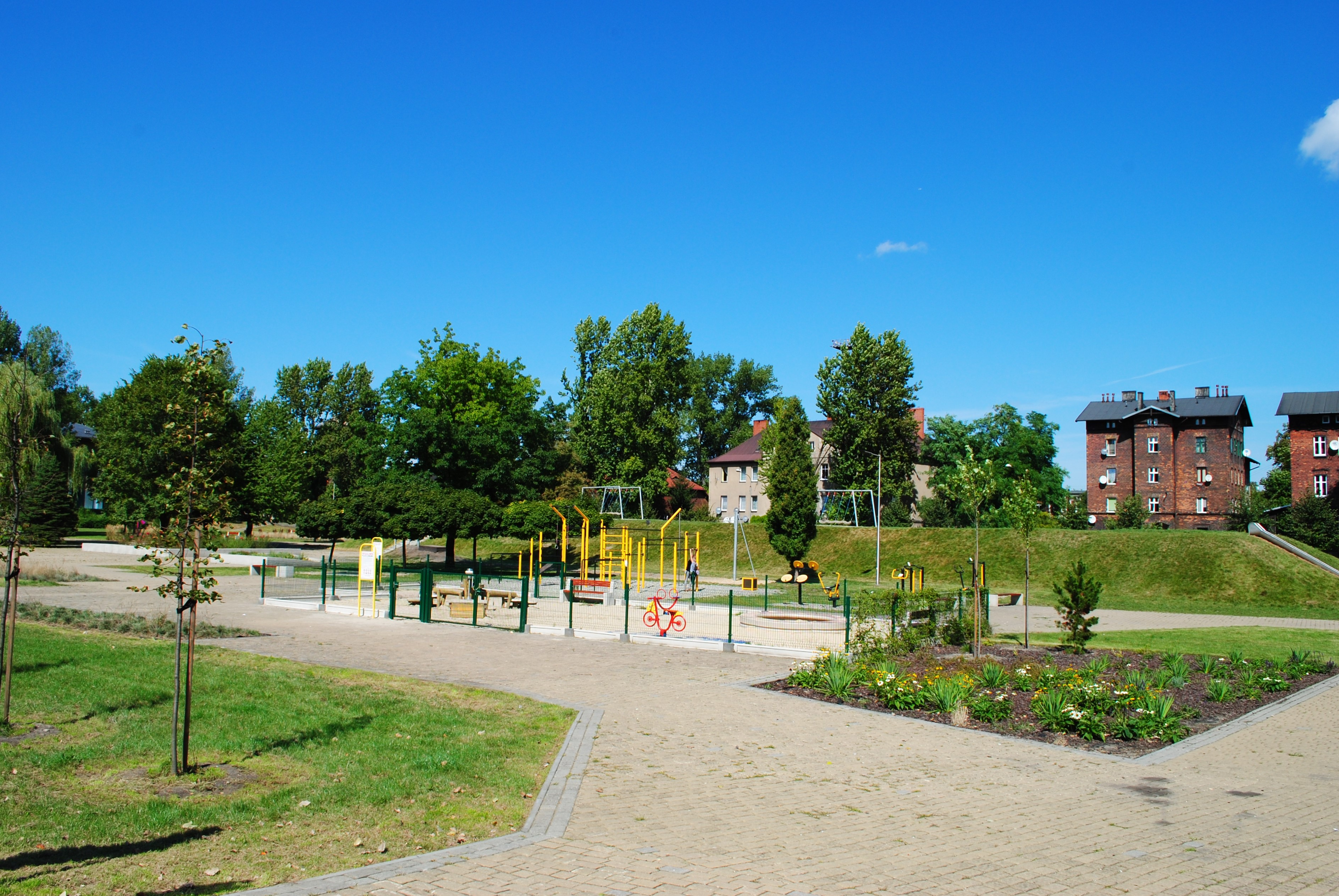
Park Olimpijczyków ("Olympians' Park")

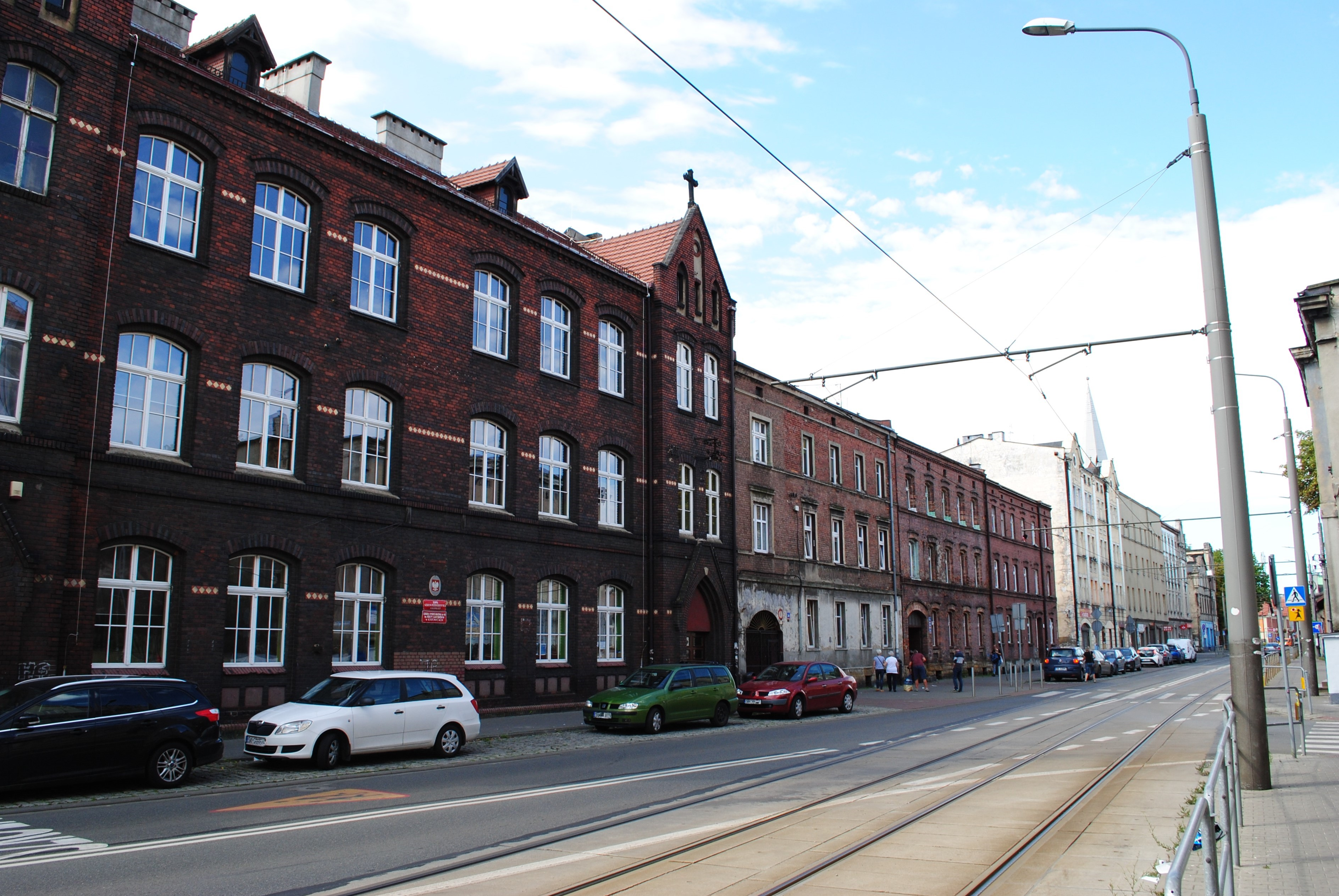
Ulica Wiosny Ludów ("Spring of Nations Street") with the Primary School No. 42 on the left

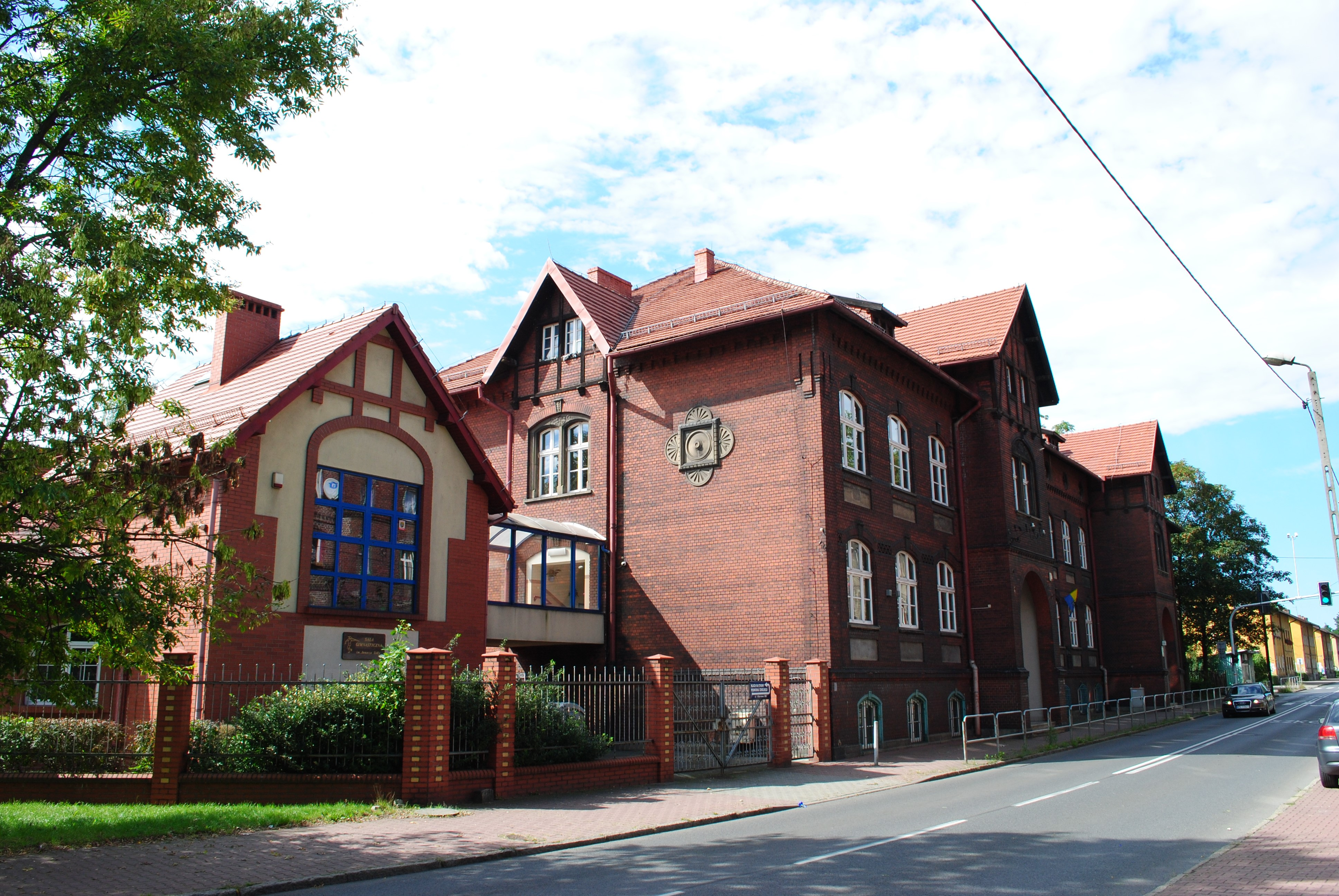
Primary School No. 44

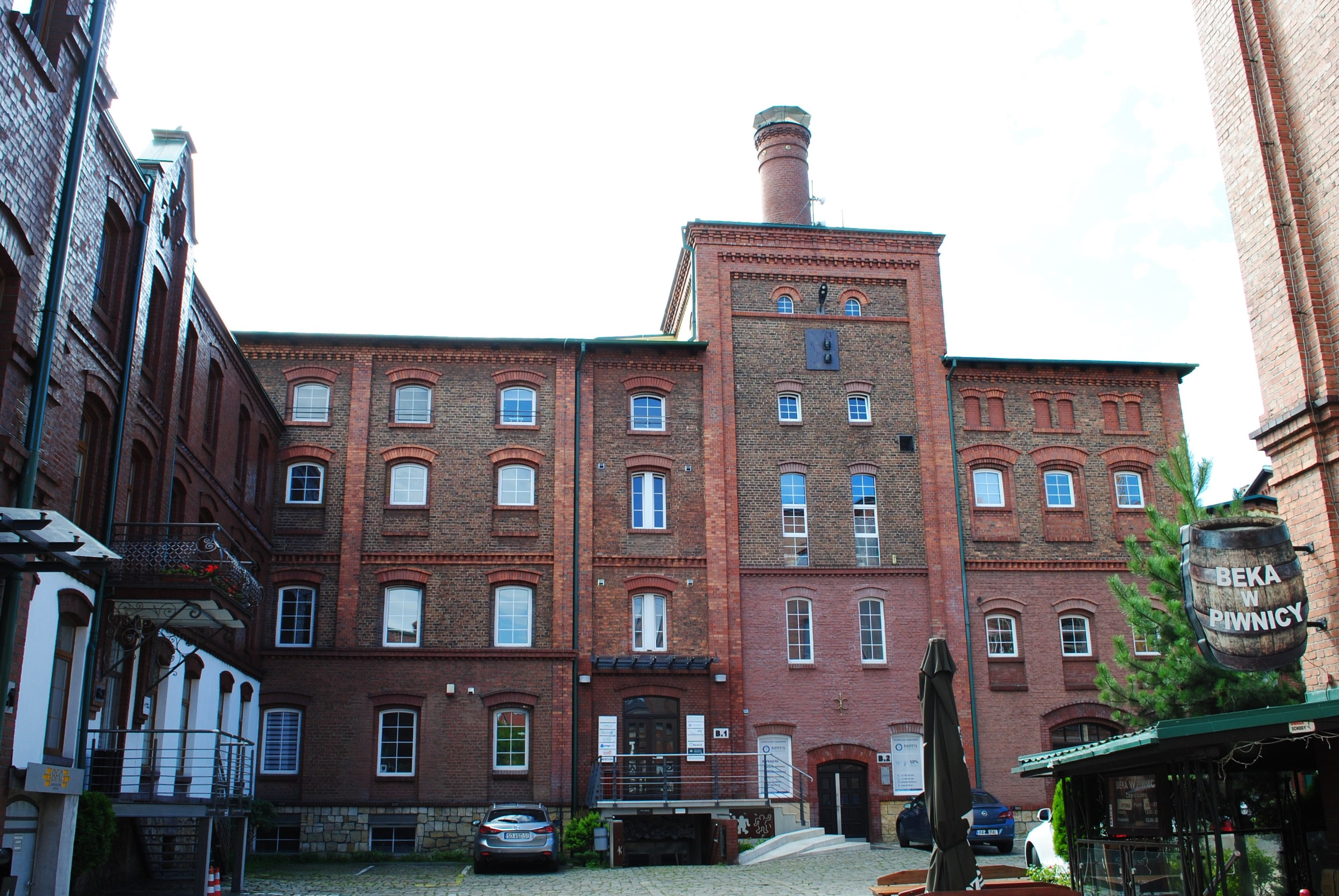
Former brewery complex

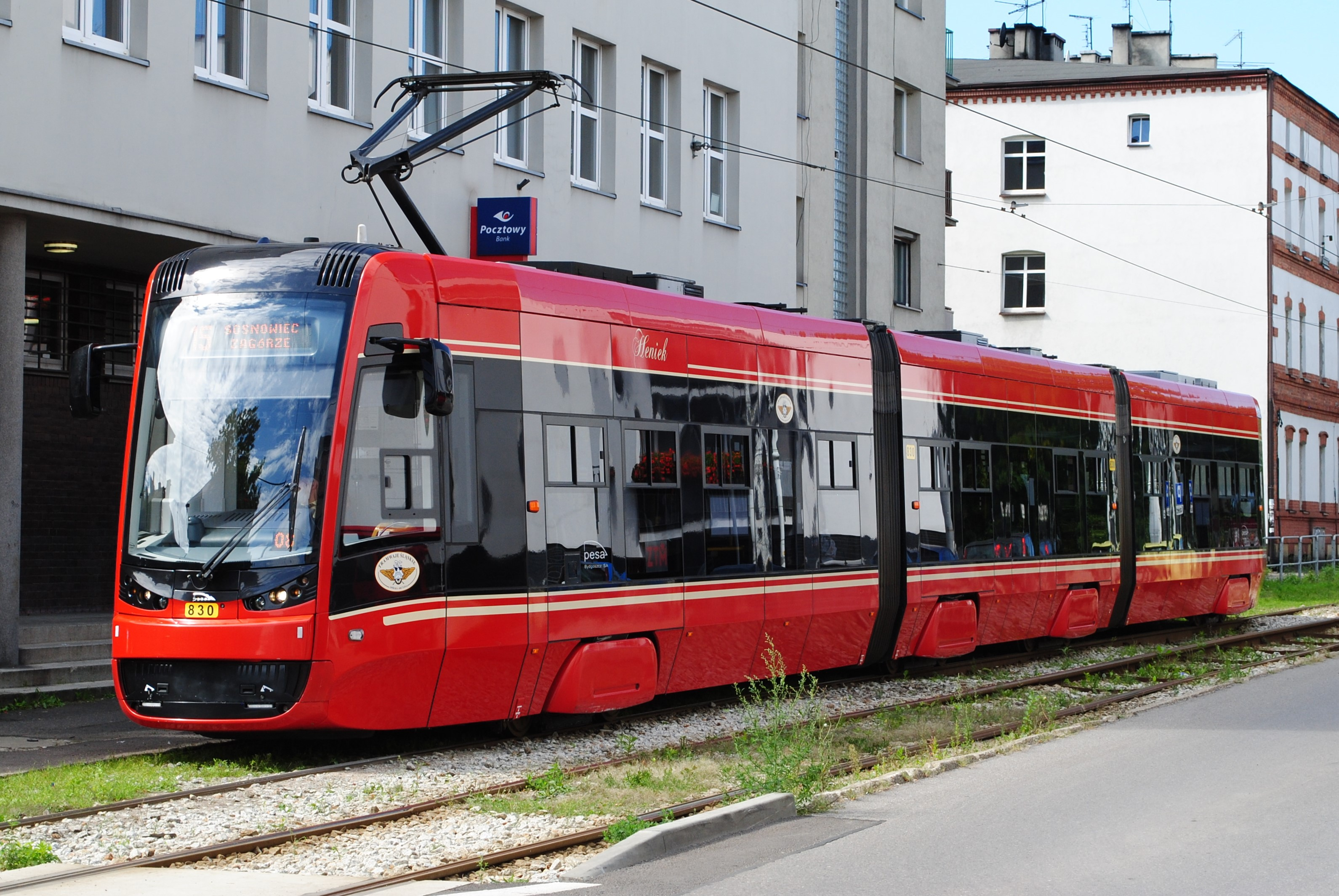
Pesa Twist 2012N tram at Ulica Obrońców Westerplatte ("Defenders of Westerplatte Street") in Roździeń

== Bibliography ==
- Absalon, D.; Czaja, S.; Jankowski, A. T. (2012). "Środowisko geograficzne" [Geographical Environment]. In Barciak, A.; Chojecka, E.; Fertacz, S. (eds.). Katowice. Środowisko, dzieje, kultura, język i społeczeństwo [Katowice. Environment, History, Culture, Language, and Society] (in Polish). Vol. 1. Katowice: Museum of the History of Katowice. ISBN 978-83-8772-724-6.
- Drobniak, A.; Polko, A.; Plac, K., eds. (2014). Diagnoza sytuacji społeczno-ekonomicznej Miasta Katowice wraz z wyznaczeniem obszarów rewitalizacji i analizą strategiczną [Diagnosis of the Socio-Economic Situation of the City of Katowice, Including the Designation of Revitalization Areas and Strategic Analysis] (PDF) (in Polish). Katowice: City of Katowice. ISBN 978-83-61061-97-7.
- Bulsa, Michał (2018). Ulice i place Katowic [Streets and Squares of Katowice] (in Polish) (3rd ed.). Katowice: Prasa i Książka. ISBN 978-83-63780-28-9.
- Fajer, M. (2008). "Gleby na obszarze Górnośląskiego Związku Metropolitalnego" [Soils in the Area of the Upper Silesian Metropolitan Union]. In Dulias, R.; Hibszer, A. (eds.). Górnośląski Związek Metropolitalny. Zarys geograficzny [Upper Silesian Metropolitan Union. Geographical Outline] (in Polish). Sosnowiec: Polish Geographical Society, Katowice Branch. pp. 119–130. ISBN 978-83-61695-00-4.
- Drobek, Daria; Michalska, Ewa; Radecki, Ryszard; Perdyła, Magdalena (January 2014). Opracowanie ekofizjograficzne podstawowe z elementami opracowania ekofizjograficznego problemowego (problematyka ochrony dolin rzecznych oraz ograniczeń dla zagospodarowania terenu wynikających z wpływu działalności górniczej) dla potrzeb opracowania projektów miejscowych planów zagospodarowania przestrzennego obszarów położonych w mieście Katowice [Basic Ecophysiographic Study with Elements of a Problem-Oriented Ecophysiographic Study (Issues of River Valley Protection and Constraints on Land Development Resulting from the Impact of Mining Activity) for the Purposes of Preparing Draft Local Spatial Development Plans for Areas Located within the City of Katowice] (in Polish). Katowice: Werona.
- Zemła, Marek (2012). Studium uwarunkowań i kierunków zagospodarowania przestrzennego miasta Katowice – II edycja. Część 1. Uwarunkowania zagospodarowania przestrzennego [Study of Conditions and Directions of Spatial Development of the City of Katowice – Second Edition. Part 1. Conditions of Spatial Development] (PDF) (in Polish). Katowice: Katowice City Council. Archived from the original (PDF) on 7 March 2016.
- Szaraniec, Lech (1996). Osady i osiedla Katowic [Settlements and Housing Estates of Katowice] (in Polish). Katowice: Artur. ISBN 83-905115-0-9.
- Tokarska-Guzik, B.; Rostański, A.; Kupka, R. (2002). Katowice. Przyroda miasta [Katowice. Nature of the City] (in Polish). Katowice: Kubajak. ISBN 83-87971-49-9.
