= Poix-Terron–Châtillon railway =

Railway line in France

Coordinates: 49.4732°N 4.8279°E

Poix-Terron–Châtillon
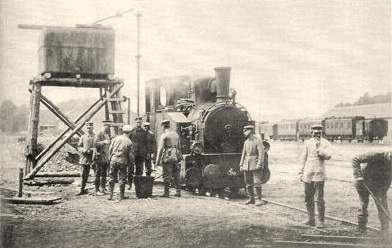
- Prussian T 37 locomotive Kattowitz 118 of the Upper Silesian Railway (0-8-0T, 785 mm (2 ft 6 29/32 in), O&K built in 1904–1906) in 29 May 1916 in Poix-Terron

Technical
- Line length: 40 kilometres (25 mi)
- Track gauge: 800 mm (2 ft 7 1/2 in); 1,000 mm (3 ft 3 3/8 in)
Route map
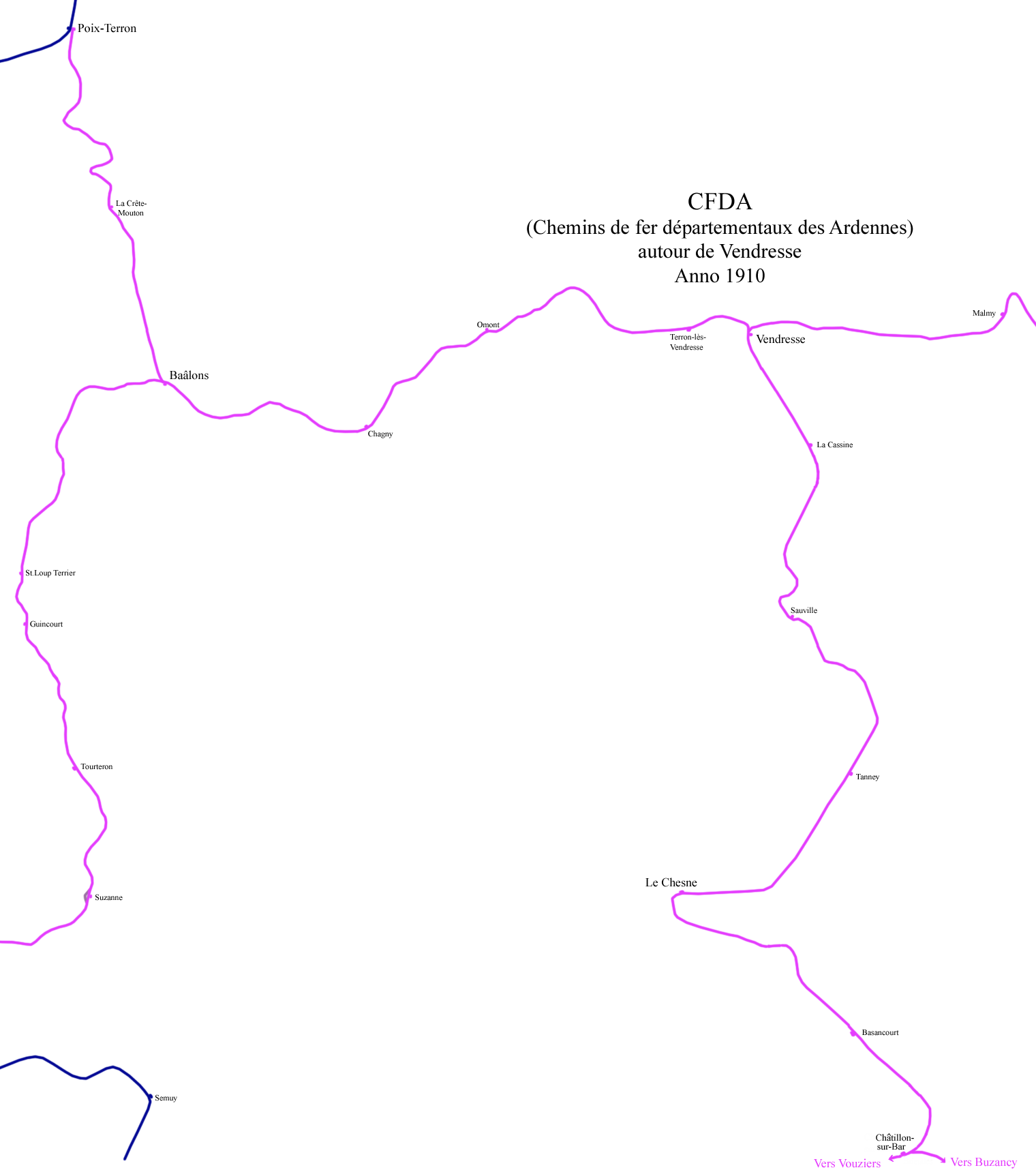
Route of the track, 1910
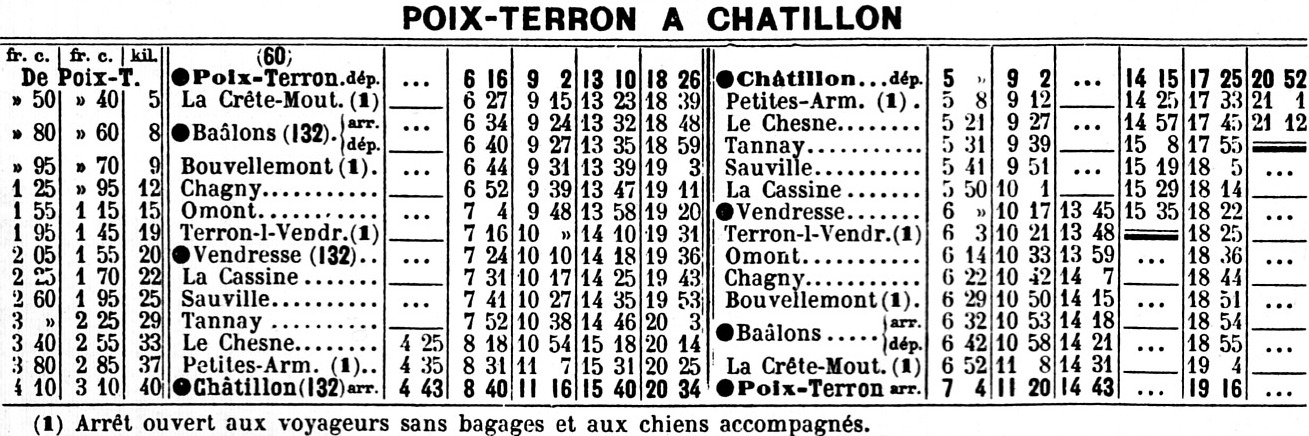
Time table of the Chemins de fer départementaux des Ardennes, May 1914

The Poix-Terron–Châtillon railway was a 40 kilometres (25 mi) narrow gauge railway in the north of France with a gauge of 800 mm (2 ft 7 1/2 in), which was opened by the Chemins de fer départementaux des Ardennes in sections from 1897, converted to metre gauge in 1923, and operated until 1933.

== History ==
The Châtillon–Le Chesne section of the line was opened to passenger and express freight traffic on 15 November 1897 and to freight traffic on 3 January 1898, the Le Chesne–Vendresse section on 5 June 1898 and the Vendresse–Poix-Terron section not until 1904.

The mayor and general councillor of Le Chesne, Dr Martin, referring to the importance of his commune, demanded that the inauguration should only be held after the completion of the Vouziers-Le Chesne main line, as in his eyes the Châtillon-Buzancy section was only a branch line. The Prêfect settled the conflict by proposing as a compromise that an inauguration ceremony be held in Le Chesne for the Vouziers-Le Chesne and Châtillon-Buzancy lines and another after the completion of the Vouziers-Raucourt line. The second inauguration ceremony took place on 21 August 1898, chaired by Louis Charles Tillaye^{(fr)}, Minister of Public Works, in front of Vouziers Town Hall, in extreme simplicity, and lasted no more than half an hour.

Based on the experience gained during the Franco-Prussian War of 1870 to 1871, at the insistence of the French military, track was built with a gauge of 800 mm for strategic reasons, to make it more difficult for an enemy army to use in the event of another invasion. Even after the ban on the use of metre gauge had been lifted and most of the operating company's lines had been converted to metre gauge, the unusual gauge was still retained, as it was felt that the unusual 800 mm gauge would prevent German use of the system. Obviously, no consideration was given to the fact that the 785 mm gauge of the Upper Silesian Narrow Gauge Railway operated by the Upper Silesian Railway (OSE) differed by only 15 millimetres (0.6 in). Therefore, during the First World War, their locomotives and wagons could be used on the line, as the running surfaces of these vehicles were wide enough to operate on the 15 mm wider gauge. Although the greater yawing motion was tolerable in principle with a corresponding reduction in speed, derailments occasionally occurred.

== Stations ==
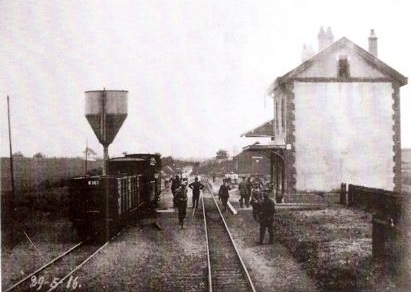
Baâlons, 29 May 1916

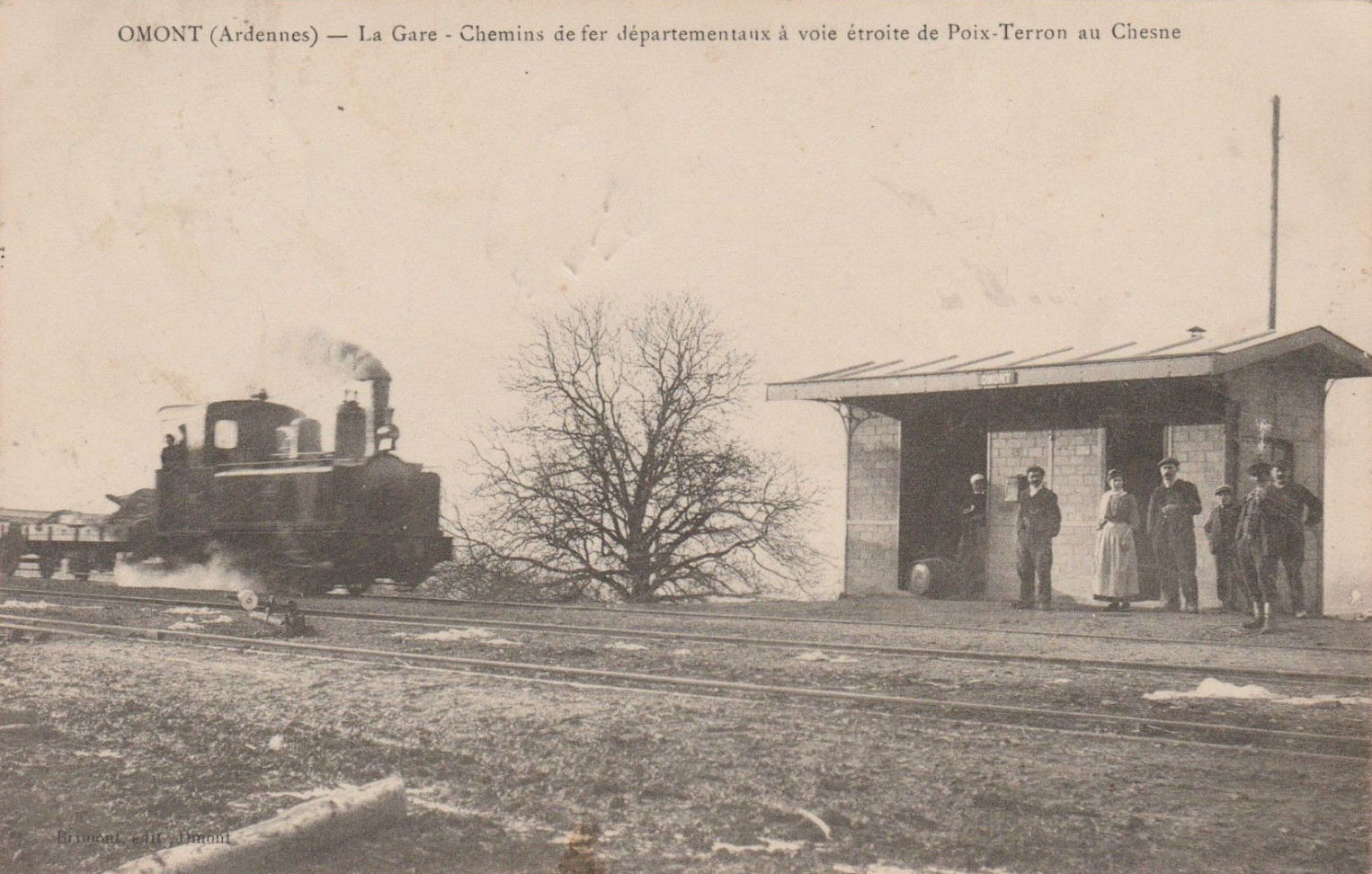
Omont

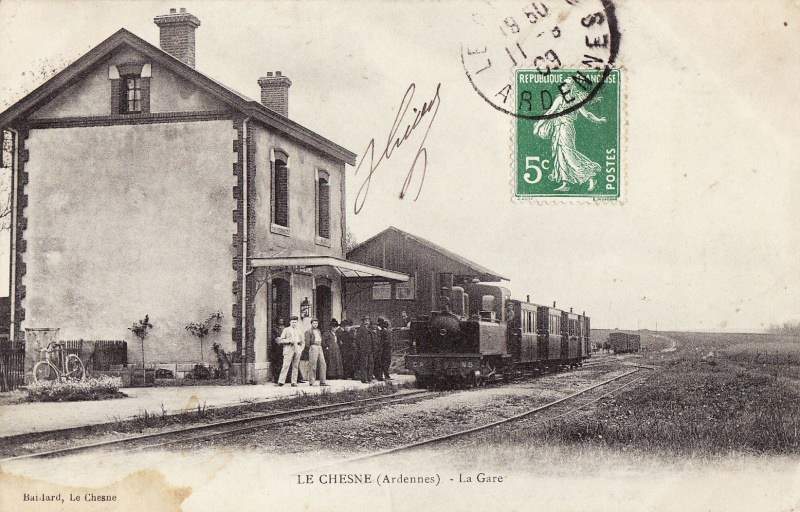
Le Chesne

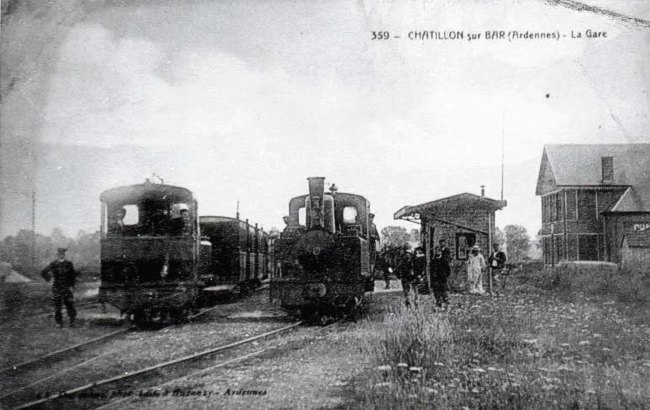
Châtillon
