= Raucourt–Vendresse railway =

Railway line in France

Coordinates: 49.60458253467371°N 4.8573448314331635°E

Raucourt–Vendresse
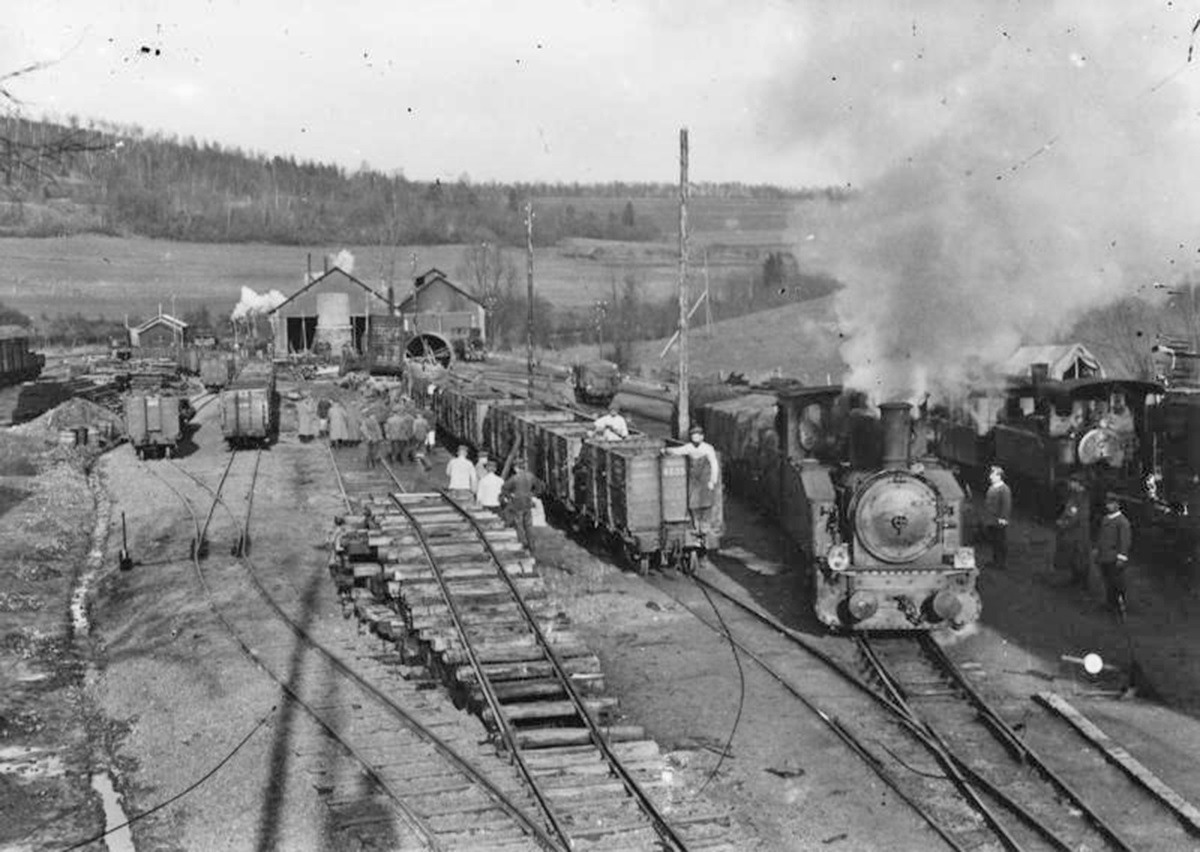
- Prussian T 37 locomotive Kattowitz 118 of the Upper Silesian Railway (0-8-0T, 785 mm (2 ft 6 29/32 in), O&K built in 1904–1906) on 29 May 1916 in the break-of-gauge transfer station Raucourt

Technical
- Line length: 15 kilometres (9 mi)
- Track gauge: Until 1923: 800 mm (2 ft 7 1/2 in); From 1923 1,000 mm (3 ft 3 3/8 in)
Route map
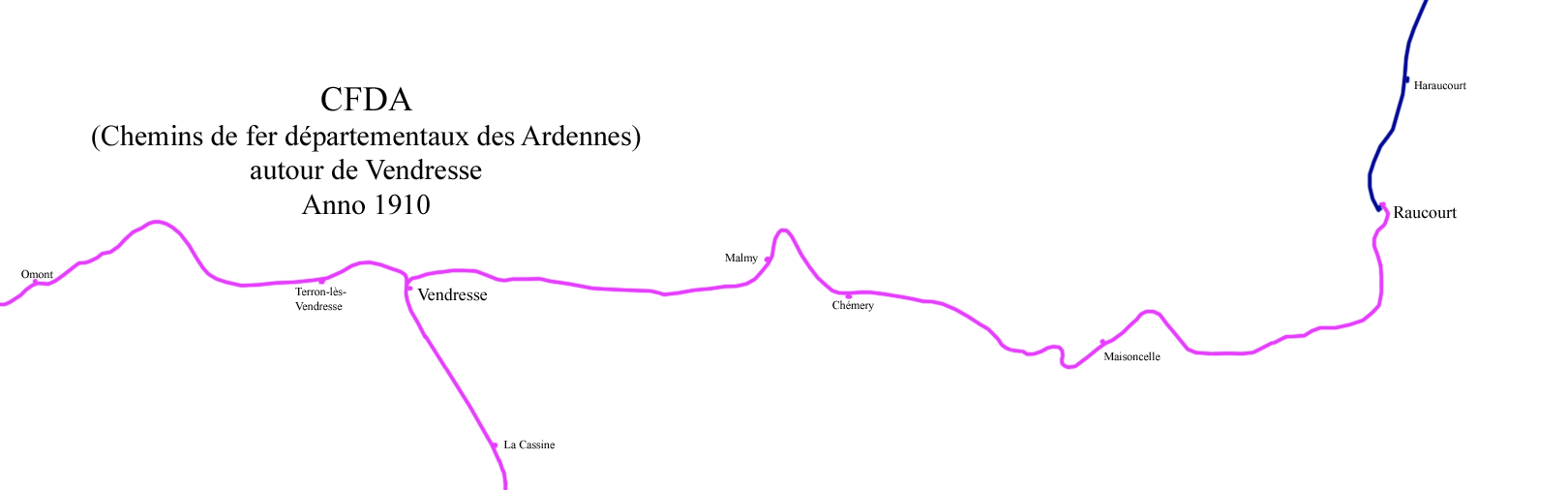
Route of the track, 1910
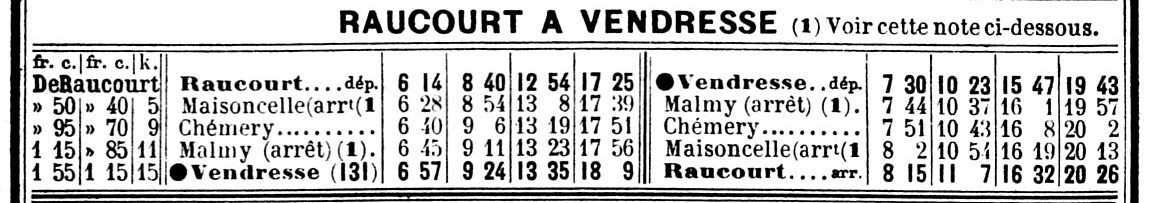
Time table of the Chemins de fer départementaux des Ardennes, May 1914

The Raucourt–Vendresse railway was a 15 kilometres (9 mi) long narrow gauge railway in northern France with at gauge of 800 mm (2 ft 7 1/2 in). It was commissioned by the Chemins de fer départementaux des Ardennes on 5 June 1898, inaugurated on 21 August 1898, converted to metre gauge in 1923, and operated until around 1933.

== History ==
Based on experience gained during the Franco-Prussian War of 1870 to 1871, at the insistence of the French military, the line was built with an 800 mm gauge for strategic reasons, to make it more difficult for an enemy army to use in the event of another invasion. Even after the ban on the use of metre gauge had been lifted and most of the operating company's lines had been converted to metre gauge, the unusual gauge was still retained, as it was felt that the unusual 800 mm gauge would prevent German use of the system. Obviously, no consideration was given to the fact that the 785 mm gauge of the Upper Silesian Narrow Gauge Railway operated by the Upper Silesian Railway (OSE) differed by only 15 millimetres (0.59 in). Therefore, during World War I, their locomotives and wagons could be used on the line, as the running surfaces of these vehicles were wide enough to operate on the 15 mm wider gauge. Although the greater yawing motion was tolerable in principle at a correspondingly reduced speed, derailments occasionally occurred.

== Stations ==
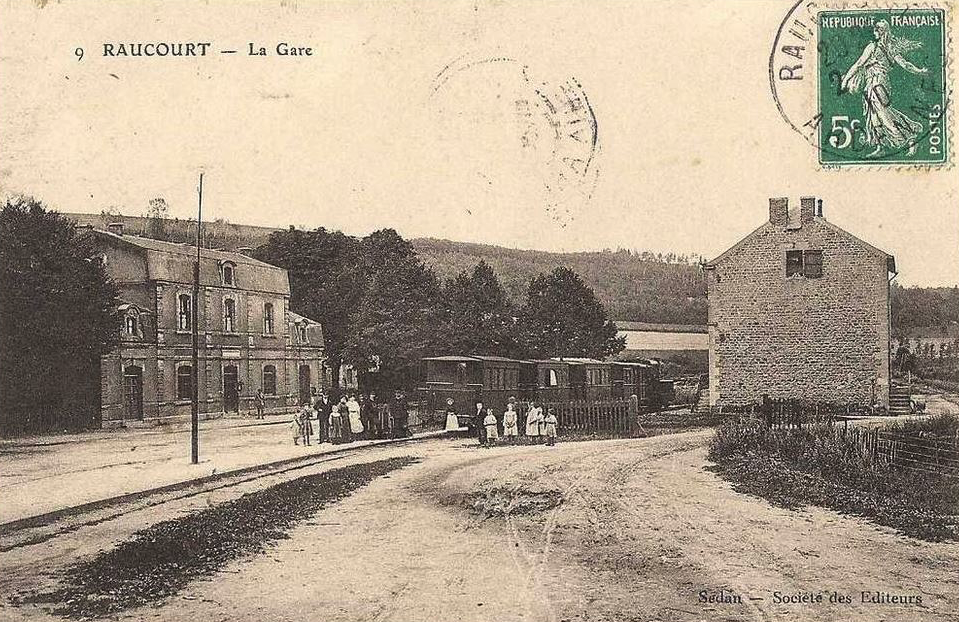
Raucourt

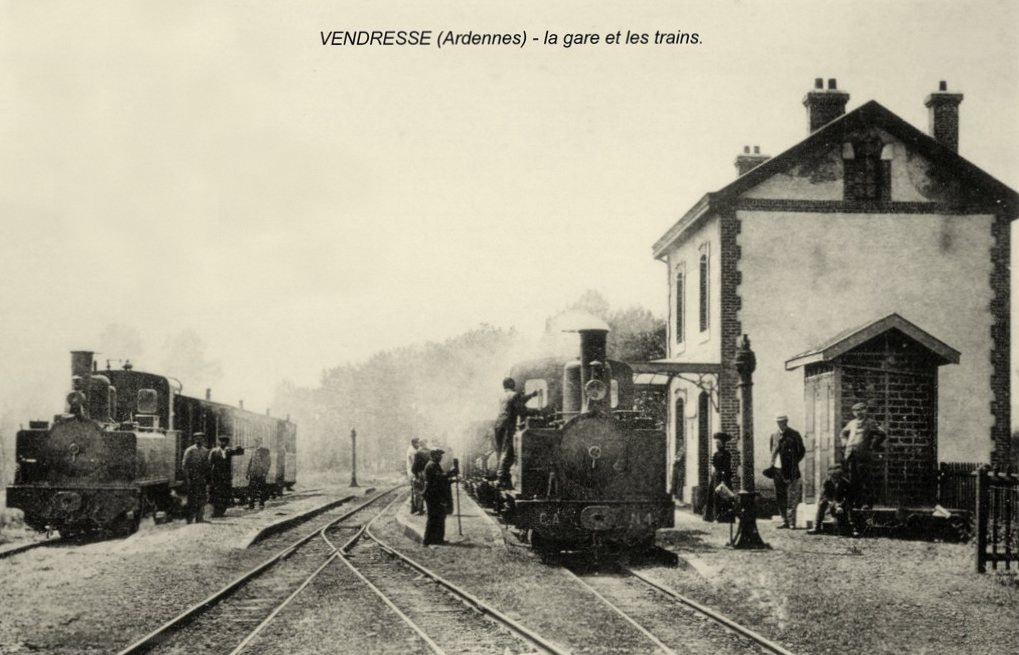
Vendresse
