= Wrocław Świebodzki railway station =

Disused terminus railway station in Wrocław, Poland

Wrocław Świebodzki
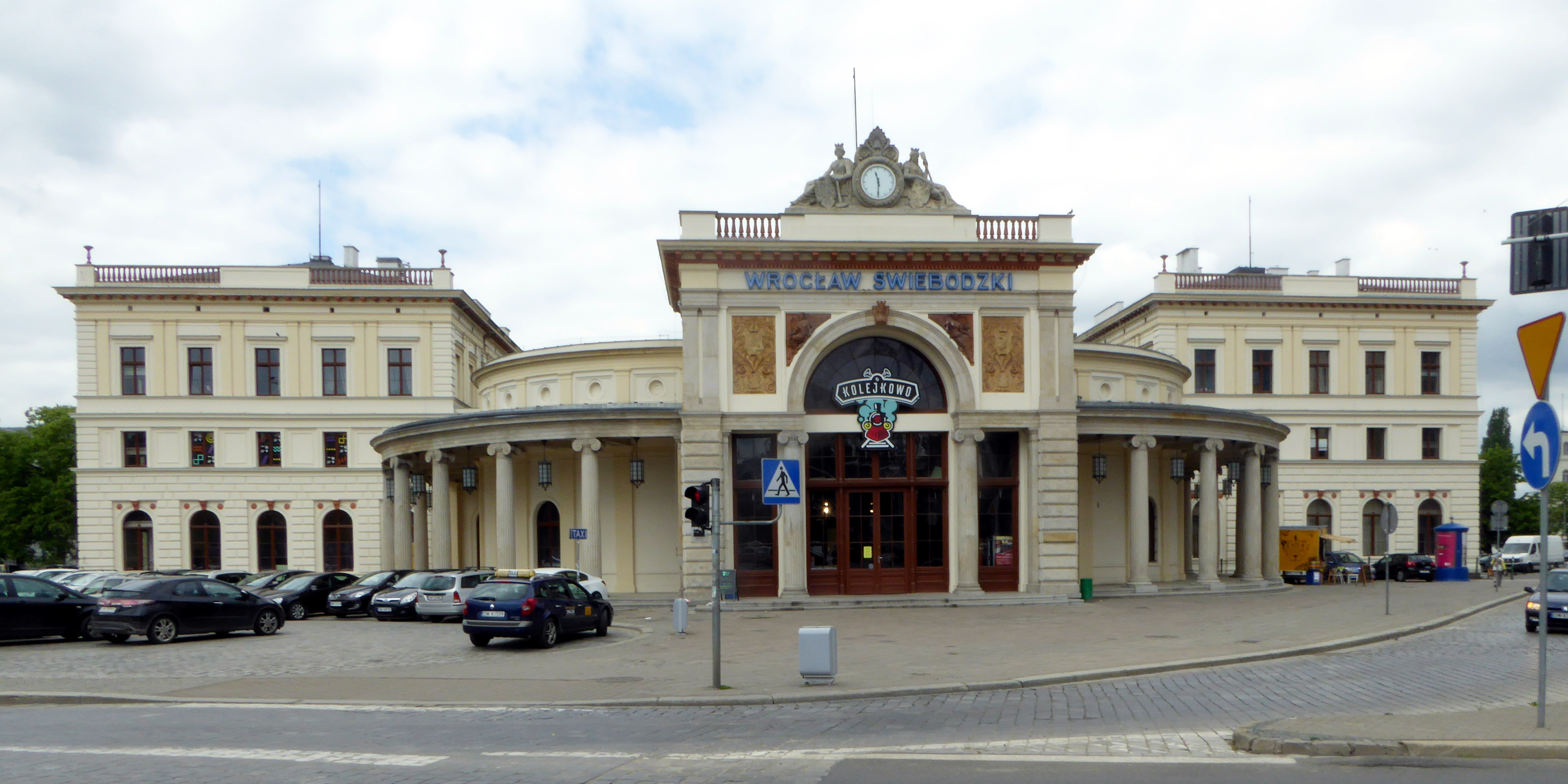
- Station building in 2017

General information
- Location: Wrocław, Lower Silesian Voivodeship; Poland
- Coordinates: 51°06′29.0″N 17°01′13.0″E
- Owner: Polish State Railways
- Lines: Wrocław Świebodzki–Zgorzelec; Wrocław Świebodzki–Wrocław Muchobór; Wrocław Świebodzki–Wrocław Gądów
- Platforms: 6

Construction
- Architect: See station building
- Architectural style: Neoclassical

History
- Opened: 29 October 1843
- Opening: 2029 (planned)
- Closed: 1991
- Former names: Breslau Freiburger (before 1945)
Location
- Location within Poland Location within Lower Silesian Voivodeship

Wrocław Świebodzki, (German: Breslau Freiburger) colloquially known as Dworzec Świebodzki, is a disused railway station in the Przedmieście Świdnickie district of the city of Wrocław, in the Lower Silesian Voivodeship in south-western Poland. Opened by the Wrocław-Świdnica-Świebodzice Railway Company in 1843, it was one of the two first railway stations to open in Wrocław (after Wrocław Górnośląski), historically serving as the eastern termini of the Silesian Mountain Railway (now the Wrocław Świebodzki–Zgorzelec railway).

Historically, Świebodzki was at the site of the busiest railway junction in Wrocław, situated directly adjacent to two major termini; Wrocław Marchijsko-Dolnośląski of the Berlin–Wrocław railway, and Wrocław Miejski Prawego Brzegu Odry of the Oder Right Bank Railway Company. It was by the early 20th century when both railway stations closed, only increasing rail traffic for Świebodzki and the newly built Wrocław Główny. During the station's operation, it served as the terminus of all trains arriving from the west, such via Görlitz, Węgliniec, Żagań, and Jelenia Góra.

Regular passenger trains were withdrawn in 1991. Świebodzki still remained operational to non-regular service trains until 1993, however this was mostly for special services such as rail shows. Since the station's closure, it has been leased for several purposes, most notably hosting the weekly Świebodzki flea market, the largest in Wrocław. As rail traffic rapidly increased in Wrocław Główny since the 2000s, several plans and proposals have emerged over the years (first in 2007) for the revitalisation or redevelopment of Świebodzki, in the aim of reducing congestion at Wrocław Główny. After the station joined the Kolej+ programme in 2023, Świebodzki is set to reopen in 2029. Works are set to commence in 2027.

== History ==
=== Planning and construction ===
The ambition for a railway connecting Wrocław with the Sudeten Foreland, at the time the most industrialised region in Lower Silesia dates back to 1830, in the aim of replacing horse-drawn transport which had been used since the 18th century. When Frederick William IV granted permission for the preliminary construction work of such a railway in late 1841, the Wrocław-Świdnica-Świebodzice Railway Company (BSFE) was established on 17 March 1842.

Construction of Wrocław Świebodzki railway station, the eastern terminus of the Silesian Mountain Railway (now designated as the Wrocław Świebodzki–Zgorzelec Railway) began in April 1842. The first non-revenue train departed the station on 28 October 1843; regular passenger services commenced the following day, initially to Imbramowice, the station was originally called Breslau Freiburger. By 1853, the line had been extended to Wałbrzych Miasto.

=== Operation (1843–1991) ===
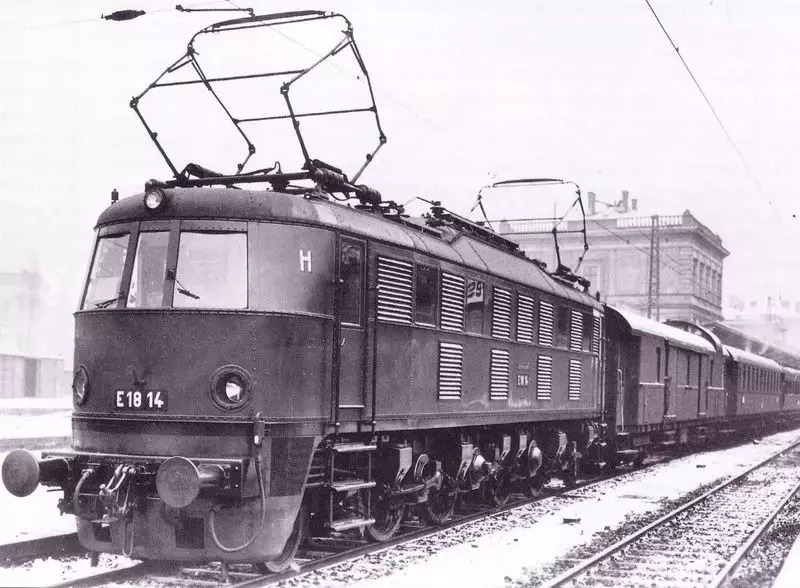
DRG Class E 18 electric locomotive hauling carriages at the station in 1937

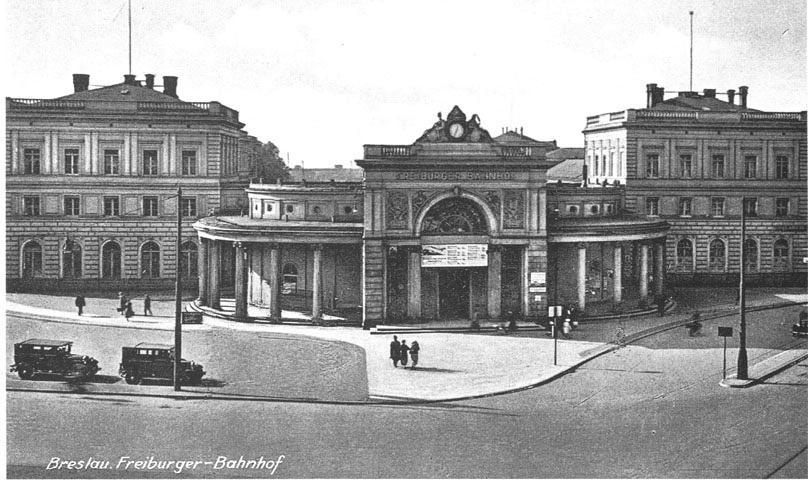
Station building in 1930–40

Initially in the 1840s and subsequent decades until the nationalisation of railways in Prussia, Wrocław was served by several termini of competing railways. One of these termini, Wrocław Marchijsko-Dolnośląski of the Berlin–Wrocław railway, was built in 1843–1844 directly adjacent to Świebodzki. Wrocław Górnośląski, which opened a few months prior to Świebodzki (making it the oldest railway station in the city), was initially connected with Świebodzki via an auxiliary track for shunting horse-drawn wagons. Later, a railway was built between the two stations, running at ground level along present-day Bogusławskiego and Kolejowa Streets. In the late 1860s, this line was raised onto an embankment, and in its western section, the tracks were relocated several hundred meters further south, along Pszenna, Owsiana, and Manganowa Streets, with viaducts being built over the streets. In return, this eased the city's southward development. Waggonfabrik Gebr. Hofmann & Co. AG (later incorporated into the Linke-Hofmann Werke Company) operated a rolling stock factory located on Kolejowa Street; a section of the former horse-drawn track was used continued to function as a line leading to the factory. In 1868, the Oder Right Bank Railway Company opened Wrocław Nadodrze; this was followed by the opening of Wrocław Miejski Prawego Brzegu Odry, which opened in 1872, directly adjacent to Świebodzki. This established the modern-day railway junctions in Świebodzki, where the three railway stations (Świebodzki, Marchijsko-Dolnośląski, and Miejski Prawego Brzegu Odry) operated simultaneously in the area of today's Orląt Lwowskich Square, Robotnicza, and Braniborska Streets. When Miejski Prawego Brzegu Odry closed in 1884 and Marchijsko-Dolnośląski closed in 1909, the two stations where merged into a freight depot (Breslau West-Güter Bahnhof; lit. 'Breslau West Goods Station'). Consequently, terminating all services at Świebodzki which would have previously terminated at the other two adjacent stations.

In 1914, the entire Silesian Mountain Railway was electrified. In 1942–1944, a network of underground air-raid shelters was built right next to the station, to protect residents from Allied air attacks during World War II. After World War II, the area came under Polish administration. As a result, the station was taken over by Polish State Railways (PKP) and was renamed to Wrocław Świebodzki. At the same time, in 1945, the Red Army dismantled the overhead wires, unelectrifying the entire Silesian Mountain Railway. Initially, in August 1945, passenger services resumed to Jelenia Góra via Jaworzyna Śląska and later, by 1952, to Gozdnica and Jasień (via Miłkowice, Legnica, Węgliniec, and Ruszów), to Żagań and Gubinek, and to Zasieki (via Tuplice, Żagań, and Głogów); Świebodzki was still used as a termini for trains arriving from the west. The Wrocław Świebodzki–Zgorzelec railway was electrified to Jelenia Góra in 1966.

=== Closure and later years ===
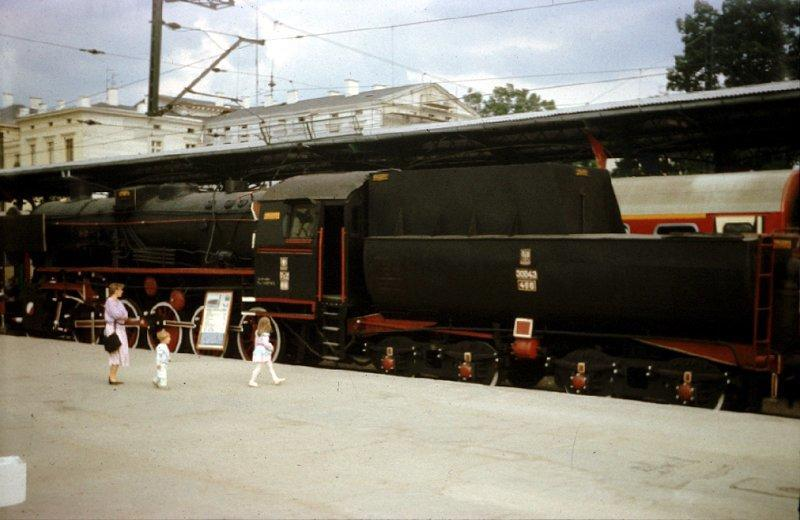
PKP Class Ty2 at the station during the May 1993 locomotive parade

The last regular service passenger trains ran to Wrocław Świebodzki in 1991, following services terminated at Wrocław Główny. Despite this, the station remained operational until 25 June 1993 (which is used as its official closure date), with occasional non-regular service trains using the station, usually for special events. Most notably, on 23 May 1992, to mark the 150th anniversary of rail transport in Poland (since the opening of the Upper Silesian Railway), a locomotive parade took place at the station, showcasing some of the most famous locomotives used in Poland. From then, the station building and area has been often leased for other purposes. Since 1994, a theatre is hosted in the station building. The building has also hosted nightclubs, and was at one point used by service companies. Most notably, a flea market takes place usually every Sunday around the station premises and on the former track bed.

=== Revitalisation and redevelopment plans ===
==== Earliest considerations and plans ====
In March 2007, part of Wrocław's broader development of rail transport, the city envisioned an integration of public transport at, among other places, Wrocław Świebodzki. The plan specifically identified that Świebodzki required some of the largest investment among the railway stations considered for integration. Ultimately, these plans never occurred. In May 2008, PKP Polskie Linie Kolejowe (PLK) and the city of Wrocław considered Świebodzki to serve the planned Wrocław Agglomeration Railway, (today's equivalent of the Lower Silesian Agglomeration Railway) saying that it would be possible to revitalise the station, in an interview with Rynek Kolejowy.

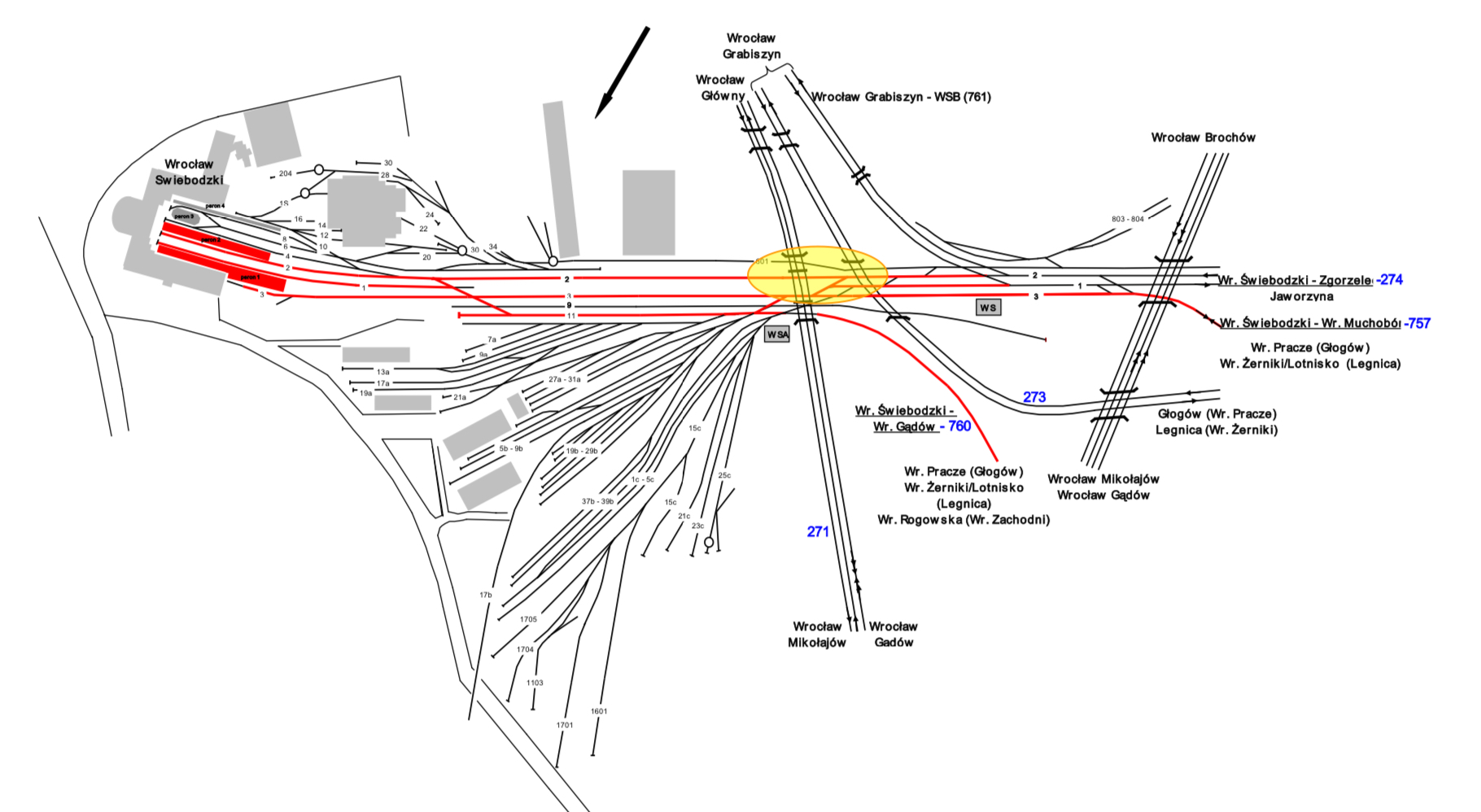
2009 plan of the railway junction at Świebodzki, this was one of the versions

On 14 October 2009, the Lower Silesian Voivodeship signed an agreement with PKP and the city of Wrocław on the joint preparation of an "Architectural, urban, and functional concept for the redevelopment and revitalisation of Wrocław Świebodzki railway station". The plan, in preparation for the UEFA Euro 2012, would revitalise the station, providing new connections to Wrocław Airport (with another new station) via Wrocław Żerniki and also to Wrocław Stadium (Wrocław Stadion). It would also serve already-existing stations at Jelenia Góra, Żagań (via Miłkowice and Legnica) and Głogów. The plan showcased 7 platforms at Świebodzki (which was made up of three island platforms). Numerous versions of new railway junctions at Świebodzki were also proposed, improving connections to other lines. The plans never went ahead.

==== Failed redevelopment proposals and plans ====
Also in 2009, Towarzystwo Upiększania Miasta Wrocławia (TUMW) proposed "Centrum Świebodzkie". The concept proposed moving the disused railway underground into tunnels, still utilising the station building as a railway station, but as a result allowing surface-level space (where the track bed was situated) to be developed into a new city centre, for new streets, and housing, creating a new large urban district. This would redevelop a space of around 70 ha (170 acres), all of which was owned by PKP. This proposal, is similar to another proposed in the 1920s, by architect Max Berg (among others). The plan was to rebuild the station to convert it into a through station, with the line being moved underground, allowing for trains to proceed further.

In February 2011, a plan was proposed with fully restoring Świebodzki and the surrounding area, which included a new larger theatre, a hotel, and a park. The station would also resume services with 3 platforms, serving mostly commuter trains but also some long-distance. If the proposal was to be approved, the station would serve around 20,000 passengers every day. The full project would have been completed by 2014, but never took place.

After the 2009 plan scheduled for 2012 never went ahead, PKP began pursuing a major commercial development project, funded by private investors. In February 2014, XCity Investment, a subsidiary of the PKP Group, began seeking investors for the redevelopment project, valued at approximately 2 billion ZŁ, and covering 28 ha (69 acres). Three developers shortlisted. On 26 March 2015, it was announced that developer Archicom won the shortlisting. Archicom planned "Wrocław City"; the developer explicitly argued that the site should become a new central urban district, rather than simply another shopping development. It would include office, retail, and residential spaces. Świebodzki was labelled as the "centrepiece" of the project; Archicom had invested 1.5–2 billion ZŁ. Investment was scheduled to commence in 2017, after all permits had been obtained. However, only a couple months later, PKP suspended the entire project after it still didn't finalise the decision whether it was even possible to restore Świebodzki itself.

Despite the failure of the 2014 redevelopment plan, the first restoration of the station building was made in December 2015 (although separate from the 2014 plan itself), were the roof was comprehensively renovated. This was soon followed by (in May 2016) the restoration of the façade, restoration of the historic clock and lettering, renovation of windows and doors, and conservation work. In the same year, PKP officially withdraw investment with Archicom. PKP also announced that it would finally study the station to determine whether it would be suitable for operation, preparing the area for similar plans to the ones Archicom had planned. The land area had covered around 300,000 m^{2} (3,200,000 sq ft).

In 2017, yet another proposal emerged, this time part of the Mieszkanie+ (lit. 'Housing+') programme. PKP identified that the area of the station would be potentially available for large-scale rental housing, the aim of the programme. By 2019, the proposal was described as approximately 3,000 apartments. Ultimately, the it did not materialise.

In 2018, Jerzy Michalak, one of the board of directors of the Lower Silesian Voivodeship reproposed the 1920s and second 2009 ambition to reopen Świebodzki with a rail tunnel, allowing for connections to Wrocław Główny and beyond. Michalak separated the plan into two phases: phase 1, open Świebodzki by 2022, and phase 2; build a rail tunnel making Świebodzki a through station. Phase 2 only remained a concept, due to its complexity and extreme costs. Świebodzki didn't reopen by 2022, as the proposal never actually entered the planning stage.

In April 2018, the city of Wrocław proposed the revitalisation of the station, along with "Śródmieście Świebodzkie"; the development of a new district in the area of the station. Covering approximately 70 ha (170 acres), this was much larger than PKP's 28 ha (69 acres) allocation, making it the largest development project Świebodzki has yet seen. The area was roughly divided by Tęczowa, Braniborska, Góralska Square, and Strzegomski Square. The city envisioned housing, offices, services, many green and public spaces, and, most importantly, the concept explicitly incorporated the restoration and return of services at Świebodzki.

==== 2019 planning and Kolej+ programme ====
On 28 June 2019, PKP, PLK, Wrocław, and the Lower Silesian Voivodeship signed a letter of intent concerning development of the Świebodzki railway junction. The idea was to produce a feasibility study in order to determine the future of Świebodzki. This all together only focused on Świebodzki and the railway itself, no longer considering any area development options. During the press conference held outside of Świebodzki, Polish prime minister Mateusz Morawiecki specifically outlined the revitalisation of Świebodzki, serving stations in Środa Śląska, Kąty Wrocławskie and other key areas of the voivodeship. It was confirmed that the National Railway Program had allocated 2 billion ZŁ for the Lower Silesian Voivodeship. The study would not only consider the restoration of Świebodzki, but also the possibility of constructing new railway station at Wrocław Aiprort, building an additional two tracks to existing double-track railways, in order to relieve congestion, and looking into the possibility of high-speed trains serving the city.

In October 2021, a consultations began whether Świebodzki could be revitalised under the Kolej+ programme. The plan is to double-track the line to Wrocław Muchobór, allowing for connections towards Legnica, whilst also rebuilding Środa Śląska to expand the station into a termini for agglomeration trains, and building an additional two tracks (making the railway a 4-track line), allowing for much higher amounts of rail traffic. New railway stations would be also be built towards the Wrocław Kobierzyce section. In 2023, Świebodzki had entered the Kolej+ programme, valued at approximately 216 million ZŁ, and that services would commence by 2029. Lower Silesian Railways (KD) announced it would serve the station, and would increase its services to Kąty Wrocławskie to 16 trains per hour. On 14 March 2023, KD completed a test run into Świebodzki with a dual-volatage Newag Impuls 36EWh, numbered 015. In 2024, a design of the station was released, showing 3 platforms (one of which was an island platform), as well as improving the connections of the existing lines the station is situated on. The design also deliberately reserves space for a future expansion towards Wrocław Mikołajów. It should also be noted that Świebodzki would continue to serve as a termini, all proposals to building a tunnel had been fully abolished.

Public consolations regarding the railway revitalisation were held on 22 May 2024 (Wrocław) and on 23 May (Środa Śląska). The public could submit comments until 26 May. Whilst for Środa Śląska railway station, part of the project, it would be rebuilt into a five-track arrangement, two include two island platforms (totalling to 4), with an underground pedestrian tunnel connecting the platforms together. In December 2025, the project entered the environmental-assessment process, assessed by the Regional Directorate for Environmental Protection (RDOŚ). In July 2026, the assessment was still underway. Consequently, PLK had to prepare an environmental impact report, and also said its in the final stages of the design development documentation. The reopening deadline is still set to 2029, works are set to begin in 2027.

== Station building ==
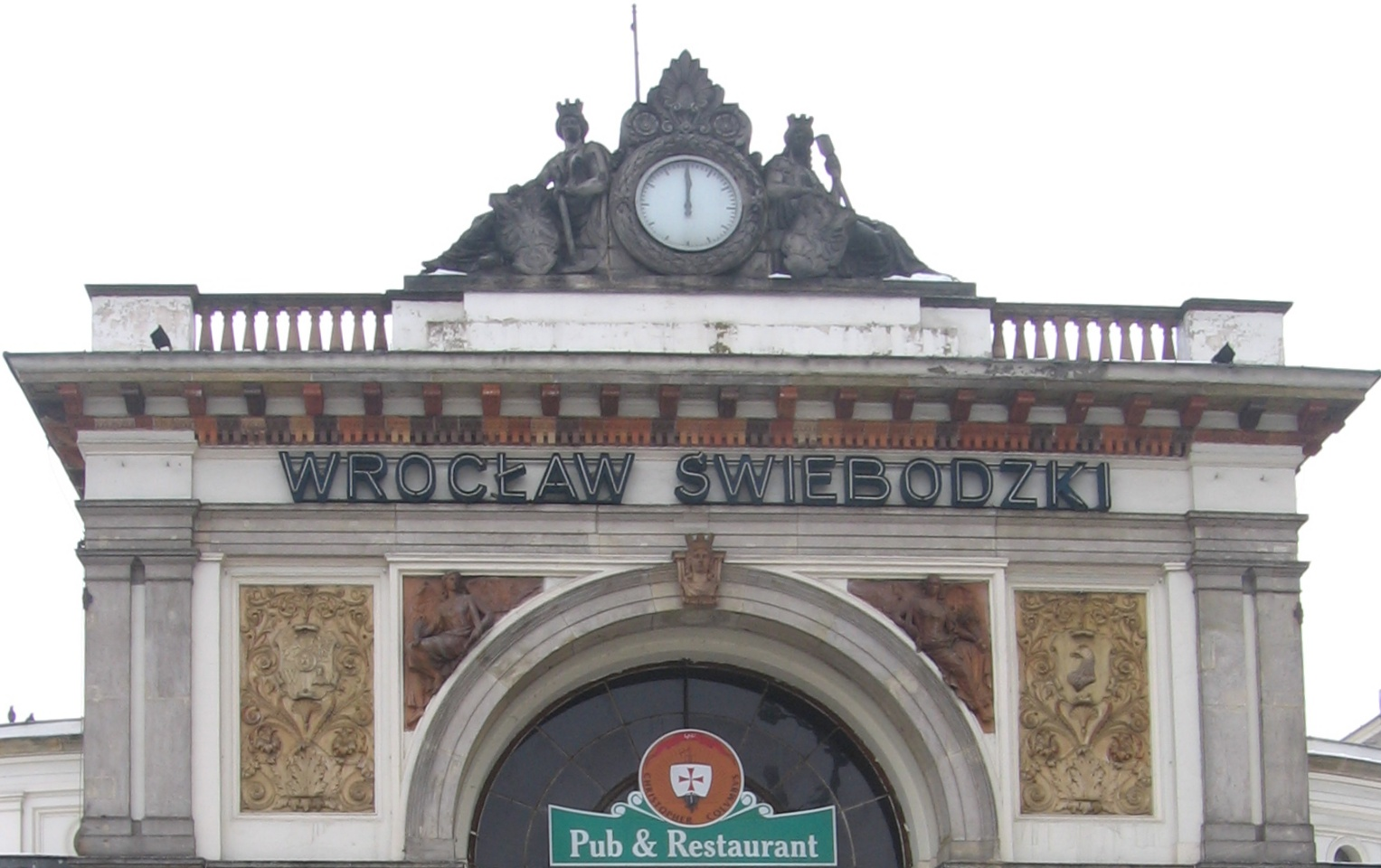
The coat of arms of Pomerania and Silesia seen above the entrance

The original station building, designed in a classicist style by engineer Aleks Cochius, was initially a single-storey building with a two-storey central section, located on present-day Tęczowa Street, in which it later housed the station administration. The station had two platforms covered with a roof supported by small columns. Over time, a second pavilion was added, just north of the tracks.

The present-day façade station building, was a reconstruction of the original building in 1868–1874 according to designs by Walther Kyllmann, Adolf Heyden, and Carl Lüdecke. With the intention of opening a connection between Wrocław and Szczecin (Wrocław–Szczecin railway) from this station, above the entrance, in addition to the clock, are allegorical sculptures of Pomerania and Silesia, bearing the coats of arms of both provinces and their capitals.

In the 1920s, city architects Max Berg, Richard Konwiarz, and Ludwig Moshamer proposed a reconstruction of the station in order to convert it into a through station (with cross platforms extending along Kolejowa Street), which would require the station to be fully underground; these plans were never implemented.

== Use in media ==
Wrocław Świebodzki has been previously used as a filmset, both during its operation and after its closure in 1993. The following films and TV series took place at the station:

- The Doll (1968)
- The Teacher (2016)
- Bodo (2016)

== See also ==
- Wrocław Górnośląski railway station
