= Balkan railway =

Former railway line in Katowice, Poland

Balkan
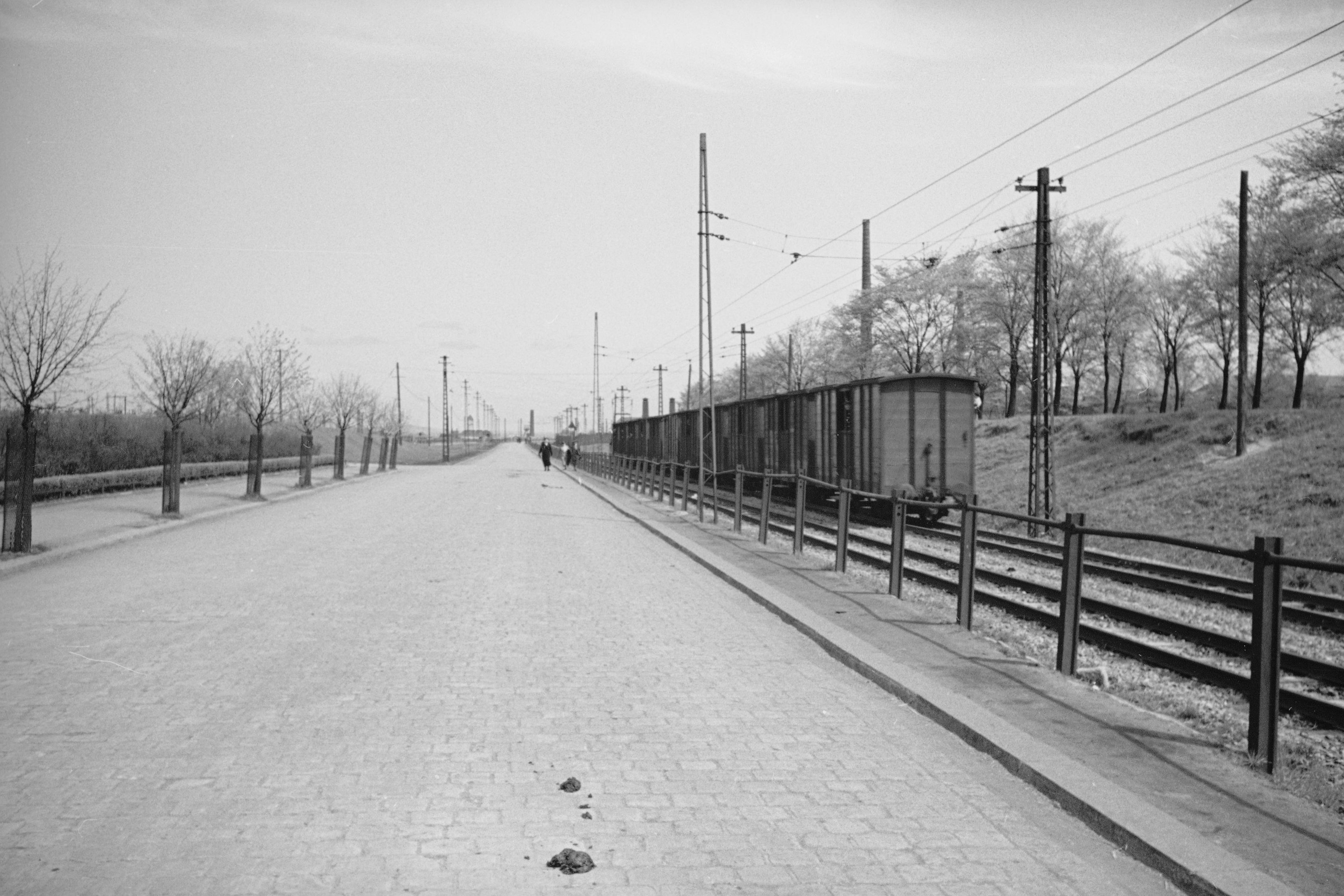
- "Balkan Ekspress" along present-day Szopienicka Street in 1937

Overview
- Native name: Balkan; Balkan Ekspress
- Status: Closed
- Owner: Georg von Giesches Erben
- Locale: Katowice, Silesian Voivodeship
- Stations: 6

Service
- Type: Narrow-gauge railway
- Daily ridership: c. 6,000 daily (1950s)

Technical
- Line length: 3.98 km (2.47 mi)
- Track gauge: 785 mm (2 ft 6 29/32 in)
- Electrification: 600 V DC (1935–1975)

The Balkan, also known colloquially as Balkan Ekspress or Bałkanka, was a passenger train service that operated from approximately 1916 until 31 December 1977 on a private narrow-gauge railway network with a track gauge of 785 mm. It was managed by the Georg von Giesches Erben concern, with a direct connection to the Upper Silesian Narrow Gauge Railway network in Szopienice. The route followed the alignment of present-day Szopienicka Street, traversing the territories of three contemporary Katowice districts: Szopienice-Burowiec, Janów-Nikiszowiec, and Giszowiec. Until 1935, the line was served by steam locomotives, subsequently replaced by electric locomotives. From 1975 until the end of operations, trains were pulled by diesel locomotives using passenger-adapted freight wagons (mixed trains).

== History ==
=== Origins and operations until 1945 ===
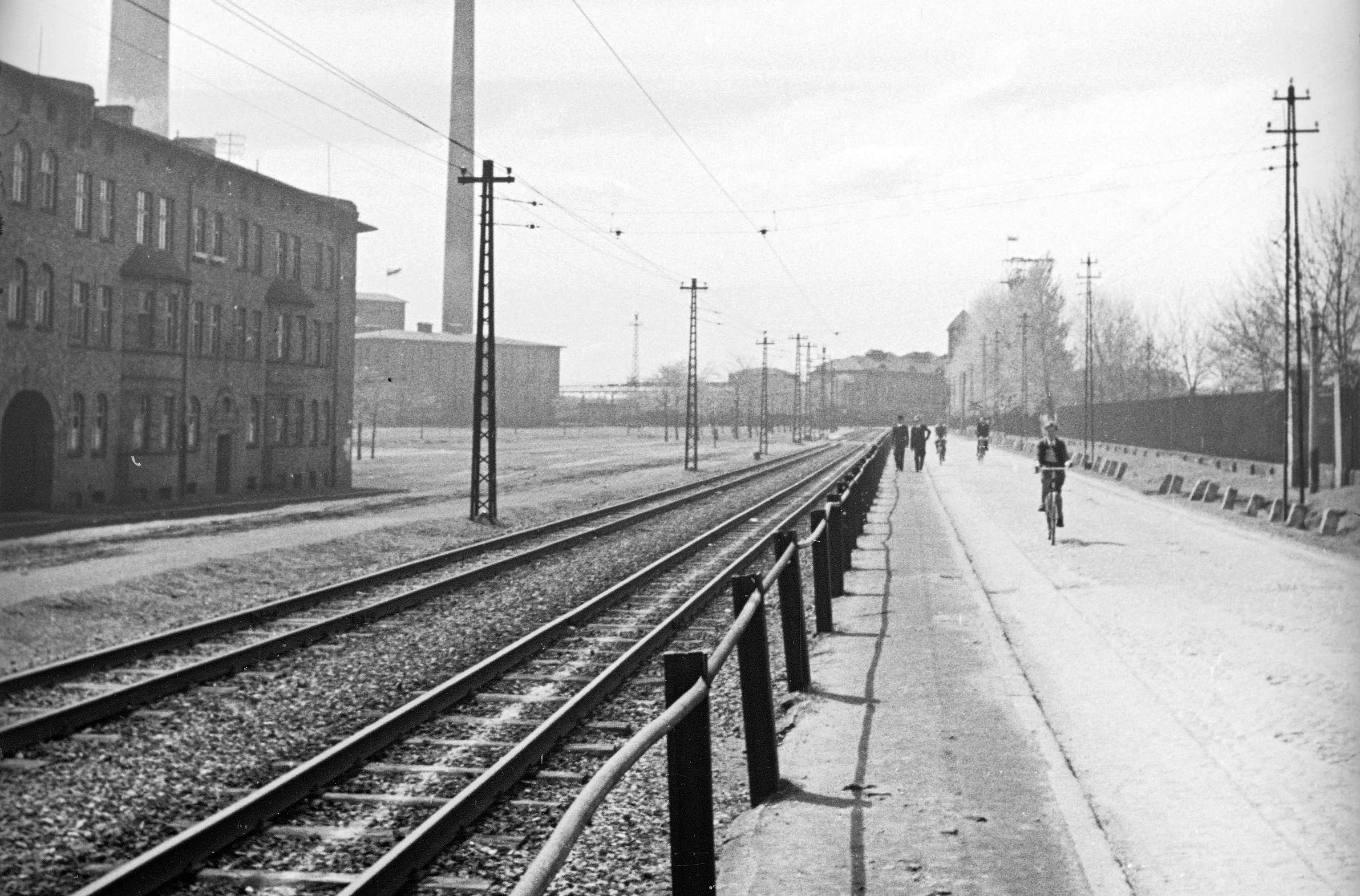
Narrow-gauge railway at the height of Nikiszowiec (present-day Szopienicka Street), along which the Balkan trains ran

The origins of the Balkan are associated with the plans of the Georg von Giesches Erben concern to link its steelworks and mine shafts – situated in Dąbrówka Mała, Giszowiec, Janów, Roździeń, and Szopienice – via a network of narrow-gauge railways. A section of the resulting network was subsequently repurposed for passenger transport. One of the first narrow-gauge lines in the Georg von Giesches Erben network was the connection opened in 1855 between the Wilhelmina steelworks in Szopienice and the Morgenroth coal mine, located in Janów along what is now Szopienicka Street (consolidated in 1883 with other facilities into the unified Giesche mine), with a track gauge of 785 mm. Initially, horses served as the traction power on this line. In the same year, the Upper Silesian Narrow-Gauge Railway connection was extended to Szopienice.

From 25 May 1909, the Giesche heirs' company obtained a license from the Ministry of Public Works for passenger transport between the Wilhelmina steelworks in Szopienice and the Carmer shaft of the Giesche mine (later Wieczorek). This line transported both goods and the concern's miners and officials. On 6 January 1914, the District Railway Directorate issued the Georg von Giesches Erben company permission to launch passenger services between Giszowiec and the Carmer shaft. Between 1910 and 1919, the Prussian state railways approved special operating regulations and instructions for this network, which were re-approved in 1929 by the Polish District Railway Directorate in Katowice, issued at that time in a Polish-German version. The first passenger train was probably launched in 1916.

In 1920, 28 pairs of connections operated on weekdays and 19 on other days. The total passenger connection length was 3.98 km, with an average one-way travel time of 18 minutes. The line then connected Giszowiec with Wilhelmina via the shafts of the Giesche mine: Carmer (Pułaski), Nickisch (Poniatowski), Richthofen (Wilson I), and Albert (Wojciech). Initially, the Georg von Giesches Erben company had a license to transport mine employees and officials, and from 1923 also miners' families, but unofficially, anyone wishing to do so used the Balkan at that time. The average daily total ridership was 8.0–8.5 thousand people, and travel by train was free. The speed of a train consisting of a steam locomotive and four-axle wagons did not exceed 15 km/h at that time.

In Giszowiec, the Balkan's terminal stop was located at the present intersection of Szopienicka and Mysłowicka streets, but the narrow-gauge railway tracks extended further – to the boiler house near the present Gościnna Street. In 1921, a branch was built running along Mysłowicka Street and through the Neubau estate, from where one branch led to the brickworks established in 1919 and the Eastern shaft, and the other to the mine's horse-drawn rolling stock, also from 1919, in the area of the present Adam estate. In 1943, the Balkan carried 8,000 passengers daily.

=== Post-war period ===
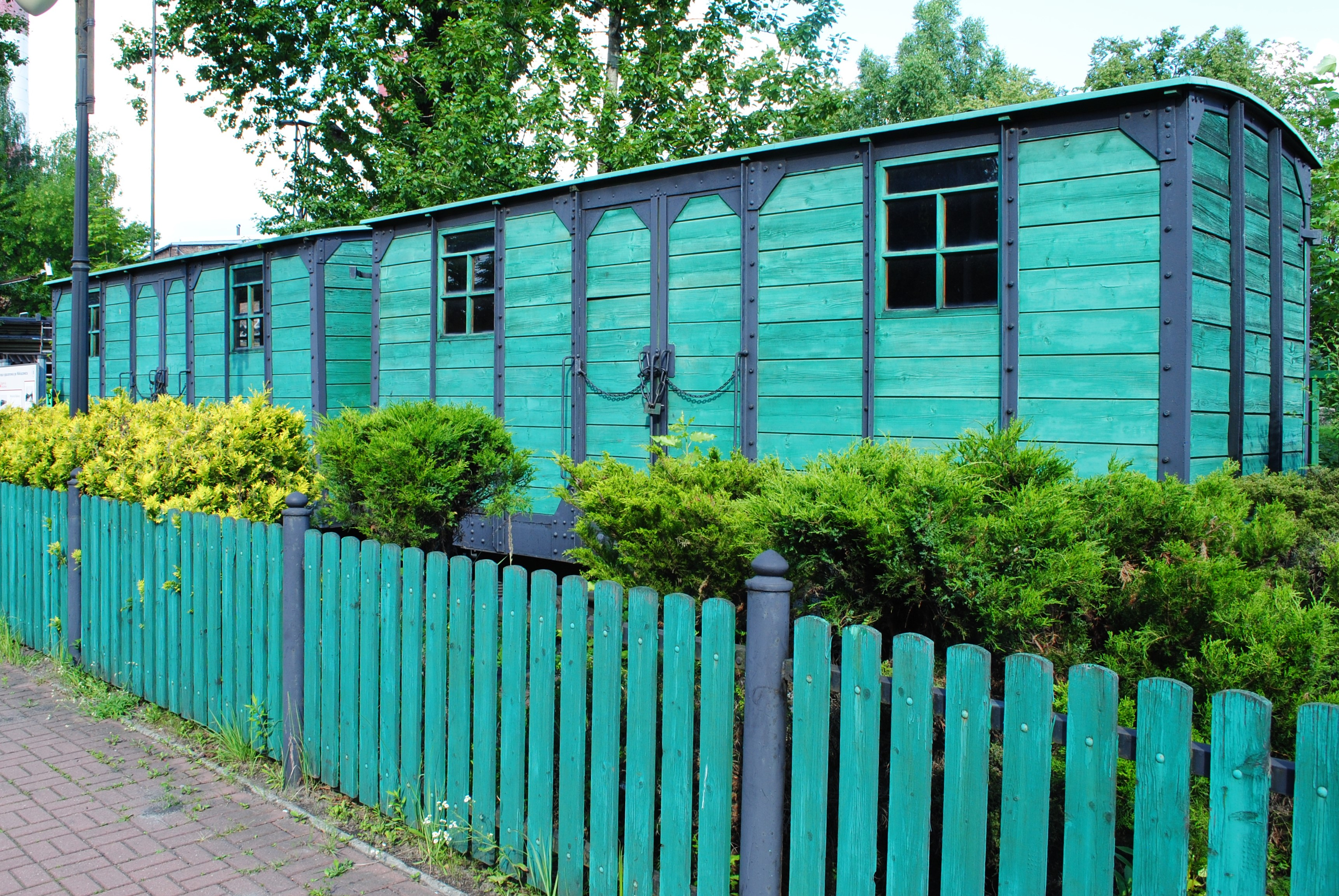
Restored Balkan wagons from 2001, located at the Pułaski shaft of the Wieczorek mine

Following World War II, trains typically consisted of a locomotive hauling two or three wagons. During the 1950s, 23 train pairs operated daily, with average daily ridership approximating 6,000 passengers. In the 1960s, the administration of the Wieczorek mine initiated efforts to discontinue the Balkan service, citing the deteriorated condition of the wagons and the availability of bus transport, which rendered the acquisition of new rolling stock uneconomical. These proposals encountered opposition from miners. Instead, the overhead electric traction infrastructure was removed, leading to the introduction of diesel locomotives on the route.

Toward the end of the 1960s, services were extended northwest to the I transfer-receiving station (Katowice Szopienice) via Bagno, increasing the total passenger route length to 6.859 km. This extension was shortly thereafter discontinued, with trains reverting to termination at the Szyb Wojciech railway station. From 1975, operations employed diesel locomotives pulling five 4-axle wagons. The final train ran on 31 December 1977, operating on the Giszowiec–Szyb Wojciech route. Balkan's responsibilities were subsequently assumed by company buses and municipal public transport services.

During the 1980s, portions of the track continued in use as an internal mine railway for the Wieczorek mine for material transport between shafts. In 1982, Katowice municipal authorities explored options for reactivating the line, but the Wieczorek mine proceeded with dismantling the segment between the Pułaski shaft and Giszowiec. The section from the Pułaski shaft through Giszowiec to the Wschodni shaft was dismantled around 1984. In 2001, two restored wagons were installed as a memorial to the Balkan along the former trackbed on Szopienicka Street, adjacent to the Pułaski shaft of the Wieczorek mine.

The service was known as Balkan, Balkan Ekspress, or Bałkanka, possibly derived from the Balkanzug express train introduced in 1916 on the Berlin–Constantinople route. The Balkan also emerged as a recurrent theme in the works of the painter Ewald Gawlik, associated with the Janów Group.

== Rolling stock ==
The Balkan passenger trains initially used steam locomotives, including units manufactured by Borsig. The standard crew composition comprised a train manager, conductors, an engineer, and a fireman. In 1935, steam traction was superseded by electric locomotives following the electrification of the line with 600 V DC overhead wiring. Siemens electric locomotives were employed for hauling services during this period. From 1975, trains were operated using diesel locomotives, specifically models WLs150 or WLs180, which pulled five 4-axle wagons. The empty weight of such a train was 22.5 tonnes, with a brake weight percentage of 16% applicable to the line.

Passenger services relied on adapted goods wagons (mixed trains), which remained in use throughout the operational history of passenger transport. A single train was capable of hauling a maximum of 12 wagons. Each wagon featured a hand brake, with benches arranged along the side walls, resulting in most passengers traveling standing. During summer months, wagon doors were left open and secured with chains.

== Railway stations (1975) ==
Name	Type	Chainage (km)	Contemporary location	Infrastructure
Szyb Wojciech	passenger stop	0.000	Szopienice-Burowiec area of Lwowska Street	One edge platform 30 m long and 0.10 m high on the southern side
Ligoń	block post	0.753		
Szyb Ligoń	passenger stop	0.890	Janów-Nikiszowiec Szopienicka Street	Two single-edge platforms 100 m long
Szyb Poniatowski	passenger stop	1.500	Janów-Nikiszowiec Szopienicka Street	Two single-edge platforms 55 m and 70 m long
Brama Zachodnia	block post	1.175		
Pułaski	block post	1.898		
Szyb Pułaski	passenger stop	1.960	Janów-Nikiszowiec Szopienicka Street	Two single-edge platforms 65 m and 75 m long
Osiedle Wysockiego	passenger stop	2.660	Janów-Nikiszowiec Szopienicka Street	One single-edge platform 40 m long on the western side
Giszowiec	block post	3.835		
Giszowiec	passenger stop	3.980	Giszowiec Szopienicka Street / Mysłowicka Street	One single-edge platform 80 m long on the southern side

== Bibliography ==
- Frużyński, A.; Grzegorek, G.; Rygus, P. (2017). Kopalnie i huty Katowic [Mines and Steelworks of Katowice] (in Polish). Katowice: Prasa i Książka. ISBN 978-83-63780-23-4.
- Soida, K. (1995). Koleje wąskotorowe na Górnym Śląsku [Narrow-Gauge Railways in Upper Silesia] (in Polish). Vol. I. Dzieje kolei wąskotorowych. Część 1. Katowice: Śląsk. ISBN 83-85831-82-7.
- Szejnert, Małgorzata (2007). Czarny ogród [Black Garden] (in Polish) (1st ed.). Kraków: Znak. ISBN 978-83-240-0896-4.
- Tofilska, Joanna (2007). Katowice Nikiszowiec: miejsce, ludzie, historia [Katowice Nikiszowiec: Place, People, History] (in Polish). Katowice: Muzeum Historii Katowic. ISBN 978-83-87727-68-0.
- Tofilska, Joanna (2016). Giszowiec. Monografia historyczna [Giszowiec. Historical Monograph] (in Polish). Katowice: Muzeum Historii Katowic. ISBN 978-83-64356-19-3.
