= Wrocław Górnośląski railway station =

Historical termini railway station in southwestern Poland

Wrocław Górnośląski
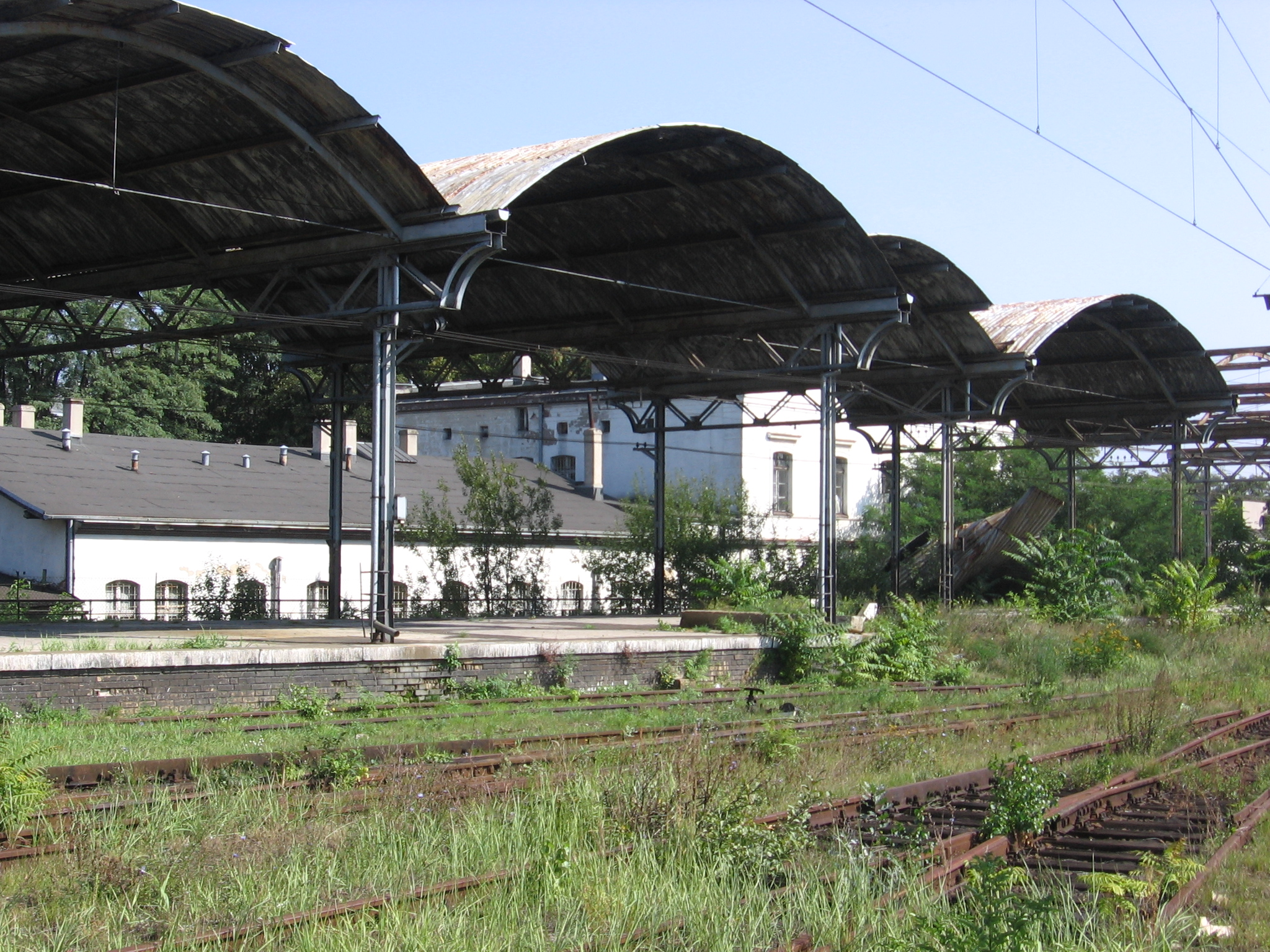
- Disused platforms and station building in 2007

General information
- Location: Wrocław, Lower Silesian Voivodeship; Poland
- Coordinates: 51°05′52.0″N 17°02′33.0″E
- Line: Upper Silesian Railway
- Platforms: 2

Construction
- Architect: August Rosenbaum
- Architectural style: Neoclassical

History
- Opened: 22 May 1842
- Closed: 1856; replaced by Wrocław Główny
- Former names: Breslau Oberschlesischer (1842–1945)
Location
- Location within Poland Location within Lower Silesian Voivodeship

Wrocław Górnośląski (lit. 'Wrocław Upper Silesia'; German: Breslau Oberschlesischer) was a railway station in the city of Wrocław, within the Lower Silesian Voivodeship in south-western Poland. Dating back to 1842, it was one of the two first railway stations to open in Wrocław, which served as the western terminus of the Upper Silesian Railway, hence the name. It is located adjacent to the modern-day Wrocław Główny, the main railway station of the city, which replaced Wrocław Górnośląski after its closure in 1856.

== History ==
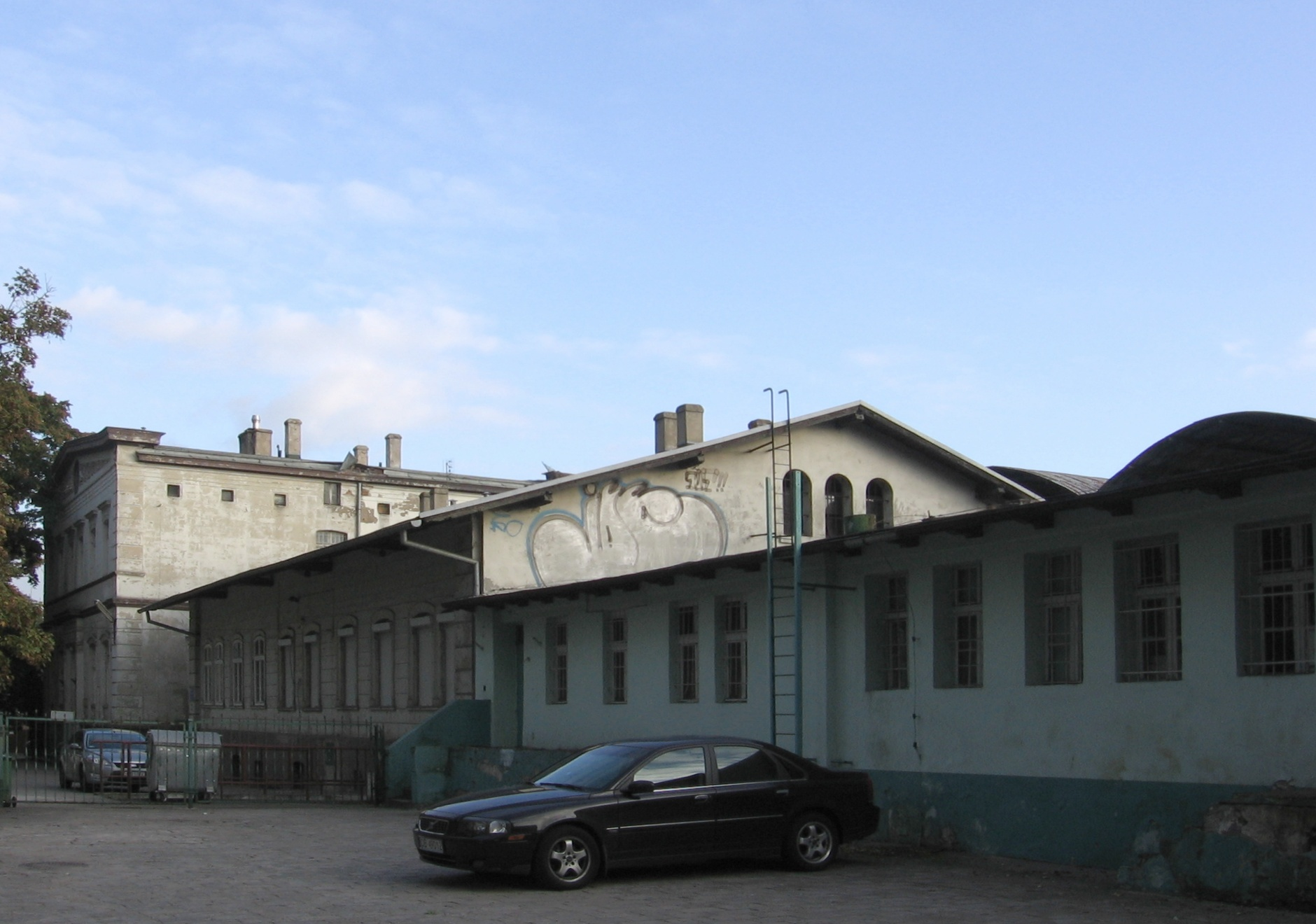
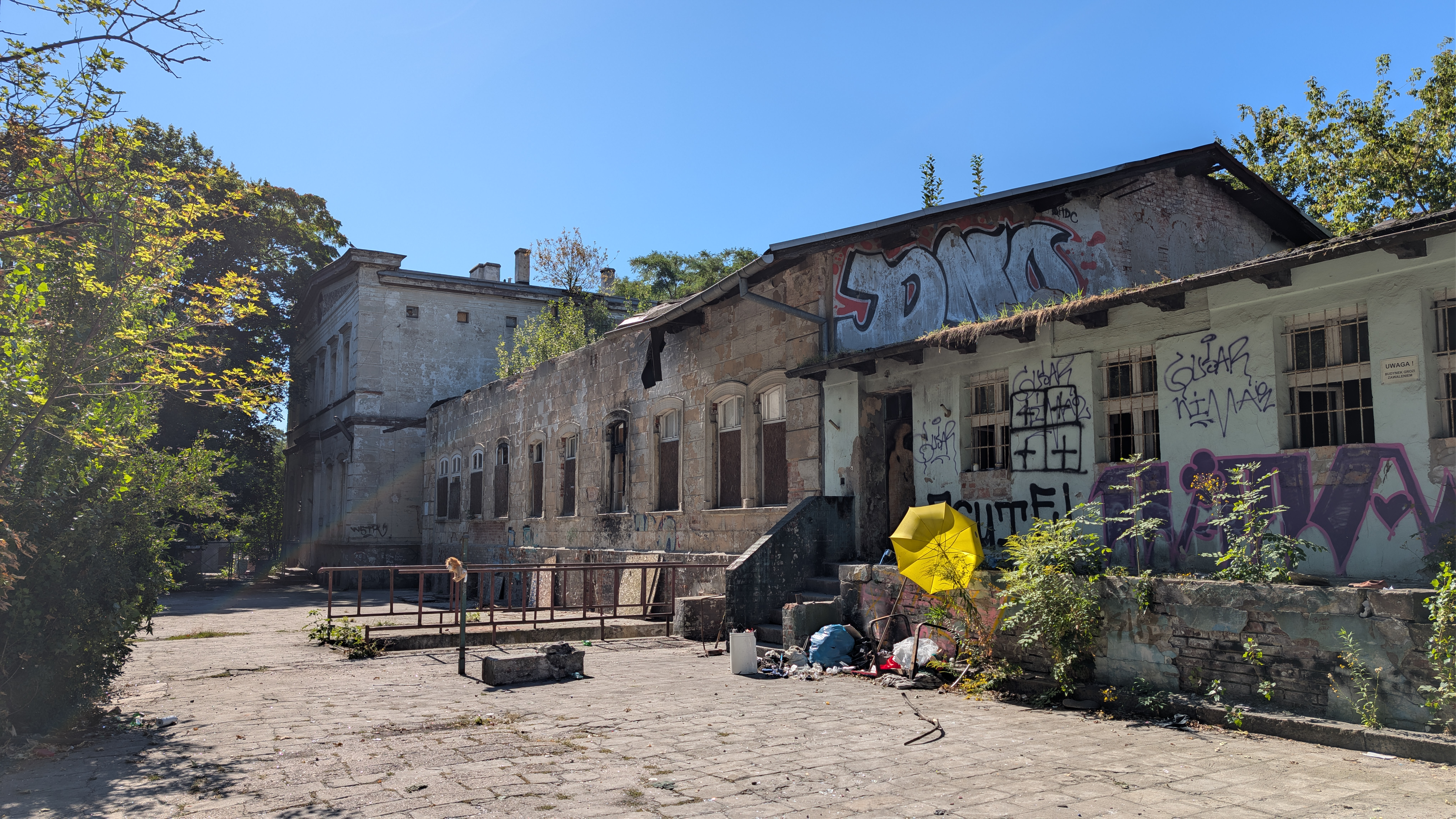
A comparison of the station building in 2007 and 2026

The ambitious plans for a railway in Upper Silesia dated back to the early 19th century, however construction of such a line, the Upper Silesian Railway, began in 1841, by the privately-owned Upper Silesian Railway Company, with the help of the Prussian government.

The station building, designed by August Rosenbaum, follows neoclassical architecture. The cornerstone was laid on 2 May 1841, making the station building the oldest in Poland. The first test runs took place on 1 May of the following year. The official opening of the Upper Silesian Railway was on 22 May 1842. At the time, the station building contained three waiting rooms (each designated for 1st, 2nd, and 3rd class passengers), a ticket office, a restaurant, a baggage claim, and a porters' lodge. Behind the station building, a two-storey railway office building and a railway management building were situated on what is now the line leading to Wrocław Główny.

When the Upper Silesian Railway Company was granted permission for the construction of the Wrocław–Poznań railway, it came to a conclusion that Wrocław Górnośląski would be too small too support additional traffic. A decision was made to build a new, larger station, Wrocław Główny. Situated adjacent to the west of Wrocław Górnośląski, the two buildings that were located behind the station were demolished to make space for the line leading Wrocław Główny. After Wrocław Główny opened in 1857, Wrocław Górnośląski was repurposed to serve as an office building with residences and workshops.

After World War II, the area came under Polish administration. As a result, the station was taken over by Polish State Railways (PKP). After the war, it housed offices of the railway health service. The station building was listed as a protected building (zabytek) in 1989.

=== Later years ===
In the early 2000s, PKP sold the oldest part of the station building to a private owner. The last rooms were vacated in 2012; the building was left in a neglected state. On 15 June 2017, a fire broke out in the right wing of the building, injuring two people. In 2025, the station building was to be set for public auction on 12 September, with a starting price of approximately 2.91 million Polish złoty, roughly three-quarters of the estimated value of the building, due to its poor technical condition which required significant renovation costs under the supervision of a heritage conservator. However, the auction never took place as the debtors had committed to repaying the entire debt the day before the auction.

== See also ==
- Upper Silesian Railway
- Wrocław Główny railway station
