= PKP class Lyd1 =

Class of Polish narrow-gauge diesel locomotive

Lyd1 (WLs150 / WLs180 / 803D)
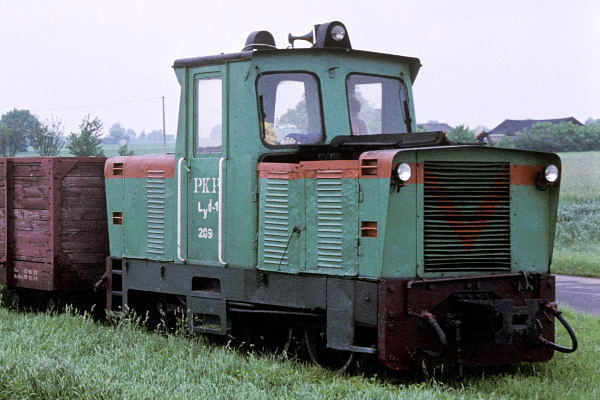
- Lyd1-209
Type and origin
- Power type: Diesel mechanical
- Builder: Fablok, Chrzanów (WLs 150); Zastal, Zielona Góra (WLs 180)
- Build date: 1936, 1960 - 1972
- Total produced: 191 (144 WLs 150, 47 WLs 180 / 803D)
Specifications
- Configuration
  - Whyte: 0-6-0
  - UIC: C
- Gauge: 750 mm (2 ft 5 1/2 in); 785 mm (2 ft 6 29/32 in); 900 mm (2 ft 11 7/16 in)
- Driver dia.: 850 mm
- Minimum curve: 35 m
- Wheelbase: 2000 mm
- Length: 5650 / 5898 mm (WLs150/180)
- Width: 2070 / 2085 mm (WLs150/180)
- Height: 3050 mm
- Loco weight: 18 t
- Fuel capacity: 250 L (55 imp gal; 66 US gal)
- Transmission: mechanical
- Loco brake: pneumatic
Performance figures
- Maximum speed: 31.4 or 40 km/h (WLs150/180)
- Power output: 150 or 180 HP (WLs150/180)
- Tractive effort: 2,750 kgf (6,060 lbf) or 3,840 kgf (8,470 lbf)
Career
- Operators: PKP
- Class: Lyd1
- Number in class: 35
- Nicknames: Lidka

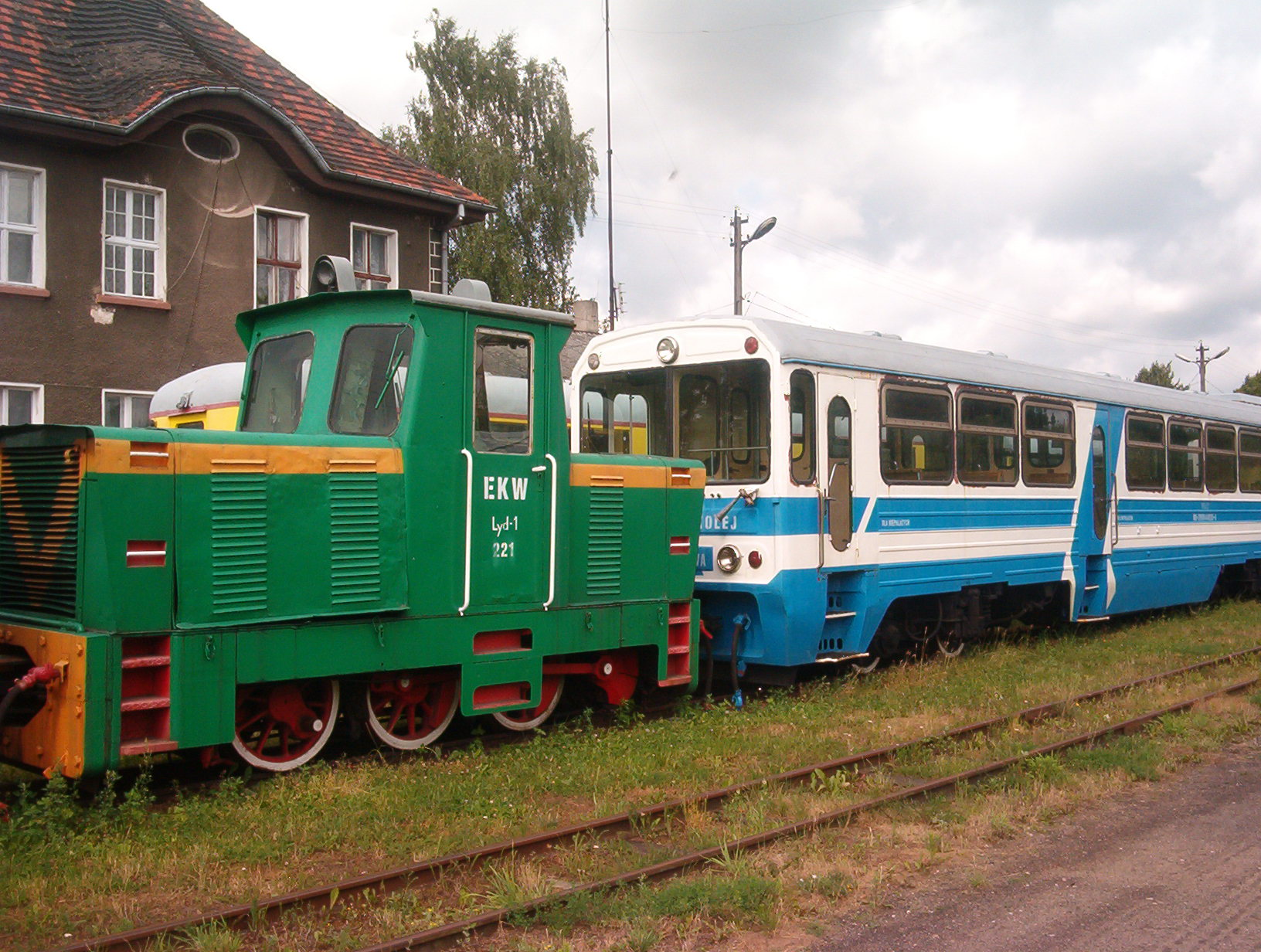
WLs150

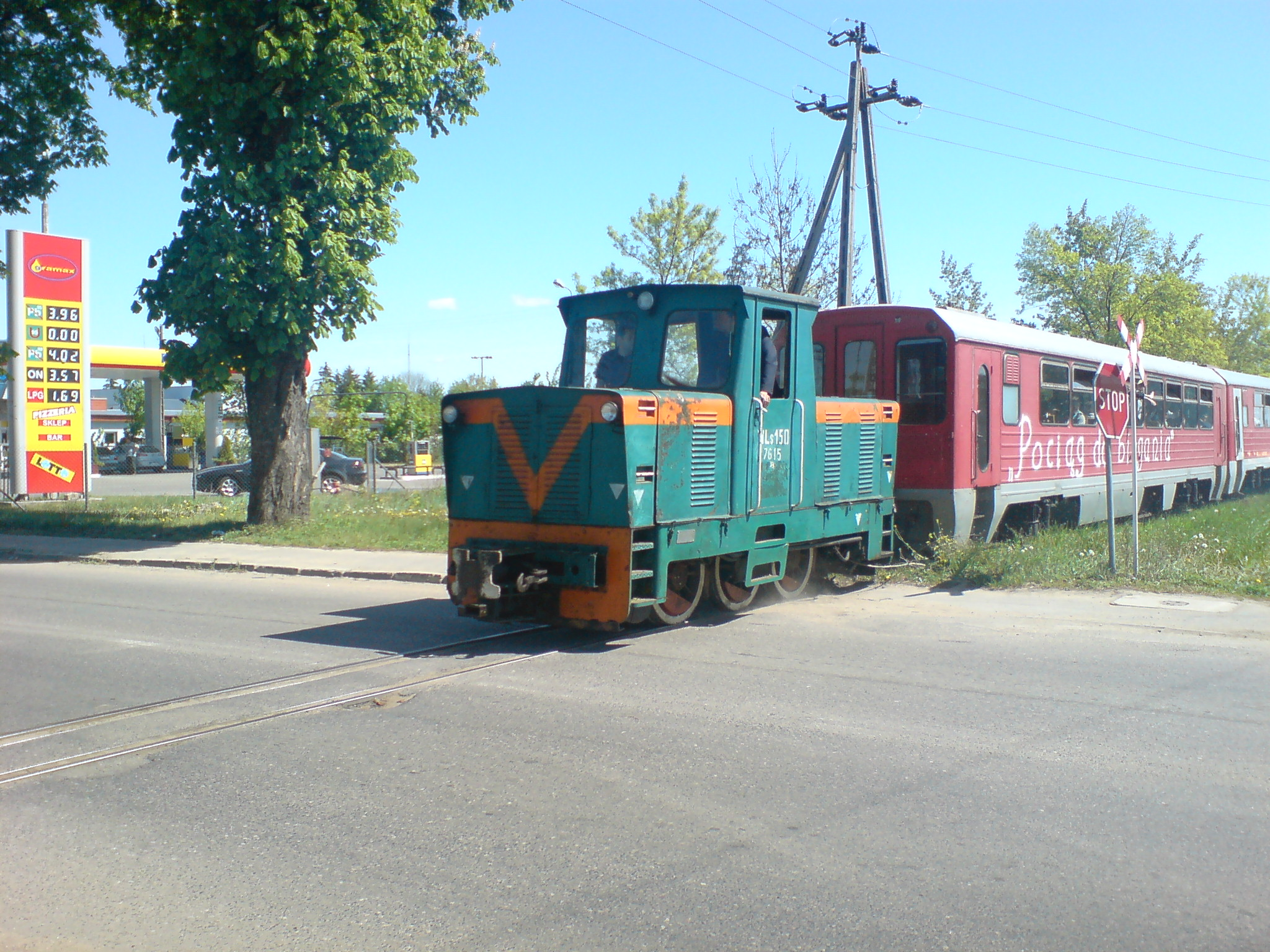
WLs150 from a rear, leading a tourist train

The PKP class Lyd1 is a narrow gauge diesel locomotive class, covering two similar models built in Poland: WLs150 built by Fablok, and its development WLs180 (803D) manufactured by Zastal. It was used by Polish State Railways (PKP) on the narrow gauge railways in Poland, and on industrial railways.

== History ==
The locomotive was designed in Fablok in Chrzanów, sharing some features and components with a normal gauge locomotive SM03 (Ls150). It was powered by 150 hp diesel engine, driving three axles by mechanical transmission, a jackshaft, connecting rods and coupling rods. A prototype was constructed in 1960, and subsequently tested on a railway of a Polish Military Weapon Research Institute in Zielonka, where it served until 1992. From 1962, the locomotive entered series production, with a factory designation WLs150 (WLs stood for Wąskotorowa - narrow-gauge, lokomotywa - locomotive, spalinowa - internal combustion engine of 150 hp). Until 1968, 144 were built by Fablok (64 for 750 mm gauge, 71 for 785 mm gauge, and 10 for 900 mm gauge, designated WLs150-2). Four 785 mm gauge locomotives were later converted to 750 mm.

A development was WLs180 locomotive, differing mainly in 180 hp diesel engine (manufactured by Henschel licence). Since Fablok was overloaded with manufacturing normal gauge locomotives, a production of WLs 180 was moved to Zastal in Zielona Góra, in cooperation with Fablok, which delivered axles and transmission. It received a designation 803D there. From 1969 to 1972, Zastal built 47 locomotives (factory numbers 001 to 047) Of these, 10 were for 750 mm gauge, 34 for 785 mm gauge and 3 for 900 mm gauge.

== Description ==
The PKP Lyd1 classification gives the technical details of the locomotives. L indicates a narrow gauge locomotive, y indicates 3 axles (0-6-0 or C), d indicates diesel fuel, and finally, 1 indicates mechanical transmission (there could be also other locomotives classified as Lyd1, but WLs150 and 180 were the only locomotives in this class of the PKP).

The locomotive is configured with a single cab in a middle. The cab has two big windows in both front and rear walls, and doors with single windows in sides. The body has car-like full width hoods over forward and rear sections, with two headlights attached to vertical end walls. In forward section (slightly longer) there is an engine with a water radiator in front and two fuel tanks on sides; in rear section there is a compressor and transmission box. In front wall there is an air-inlet grille with adjustable louvres, in rear wall there are twin inspection doors with slits. Side panels with slits are opening upwards along with roof parts. From 1971 part of PKP locomotives were refitted with the third headlight on a cab's roof. The locomotives usually used one central buffer, with an exception of 785 mm gauge ones, which had twin buffers. Industrial locomotives could have different types of couplings.

The locomotives are powered by R6 diesel engines manufactured by M. Nowotko Mechanical Works (Zakłady Mechaniczne im. M. Nowotki) in Warsaw. The WLs150 has 5DSR 150 engine, developing 150 hp at 1500 rpm, the WLs180 - 14H6A engine, developing 180 hp at 1800 rpm. A mechanical transmission 2P-154, manufactured by Fablok, is 4-gear, with reversing gear and hydraulic steering. Main brake is air one, there is also a mechanical screw brake.

== Deployment and usage ==
The locomotives were only used in Poland. Polish State Railways PKP designated them as Lyd1 series. First there were bought in 1966 five 785 mm gauge locomotives, numbers Lyd1-305 to 310, for Upper Silesian railways. Soon numbers 305, 307 and 310 and one additional ex-industrial locomotive were rebuilt to 750 mm gauge, as Lyd1-224 to 227. In 1967 there were bought 23 WLs150 750 mm gauge, numbers Lyd1-201 to 223. PKP next bought in 1971 five WLs180 750 mm gauge, as Lyd1-251 to 255. The last PKP WLs180 locomotive was bought from forest railways in 1978, as Lyd1-256. PKP narrow gauge railways were cancelled by first decade of 21st century and all the locomotives were withdrawn by then.

Bigger number of locomotives were used in industry, mostly coal mines, steelworks, sugar works and others. All 900 mm gauge locomotives were industrial ones. Most industrial narrow gauge railways were also cancelled by first decade of 21st century.

In 21st century, a number of former PKP and industrial locomotives were taken over by museums and heritage and tourist railways. A number of surviving locomotives is estimated in literature at 20–25, mostly inactive. Enkol.pl service lists however 29 WLs150 in Poland (13 active) and 4 sold abroad (two to Germany and two to Rarotonga, Cook Islands) and 14 WLs180 in Poland (9 active).

PKP locomotives	Gauge	Producer	Years of production	Quantity	Comments
Lyd1-305 – 310	785mm	Fablok	1966	6	305, 307, 310 rebuilt to 224, 227, 225 respectively
Lyd1-201 – 223	750 mm	Fablok	1967	23	
Lyd1-224, 225, 227	750mm	Fablok	1966	3 (rebuilt)	rebuilt 305, 310, 307
Lyd1-226	750 mm	Fablok	1966	1	bought in 1968, ex WLs150-7208
Lyd1-251 – 255	750 mm	Zastal	1971	5	
Lyd1-256	750 mm	Zastal	1972	1	bought in 1978, ex 803D-47
