= Upper Silesian Narrow Gauge Railway =

Narrow-gauge railway network in Upper Silesia, Poland

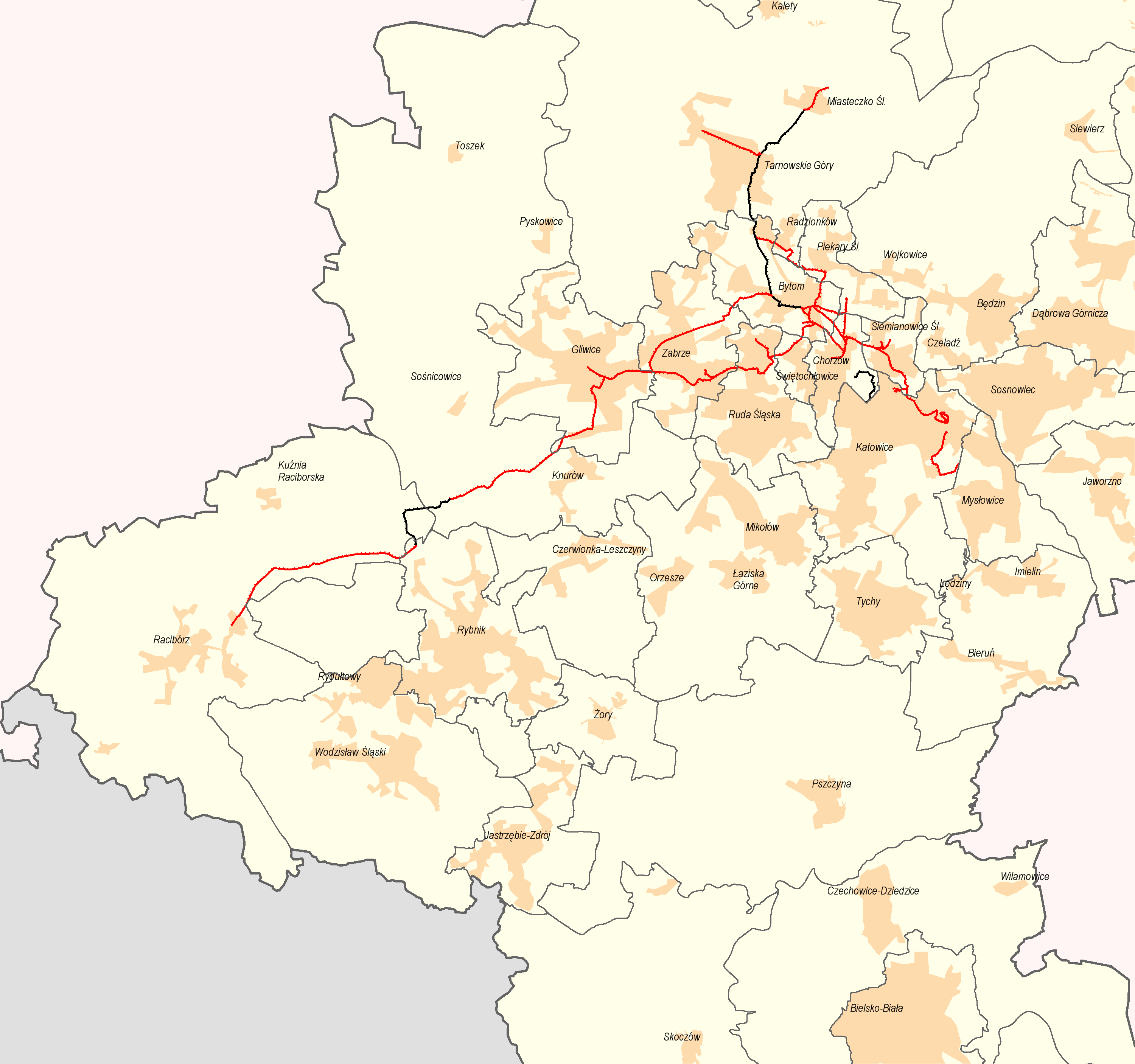
Narrow-gauge railway lines in Upper Silesia; active sections are marked in black, closed and dismantled sections in red

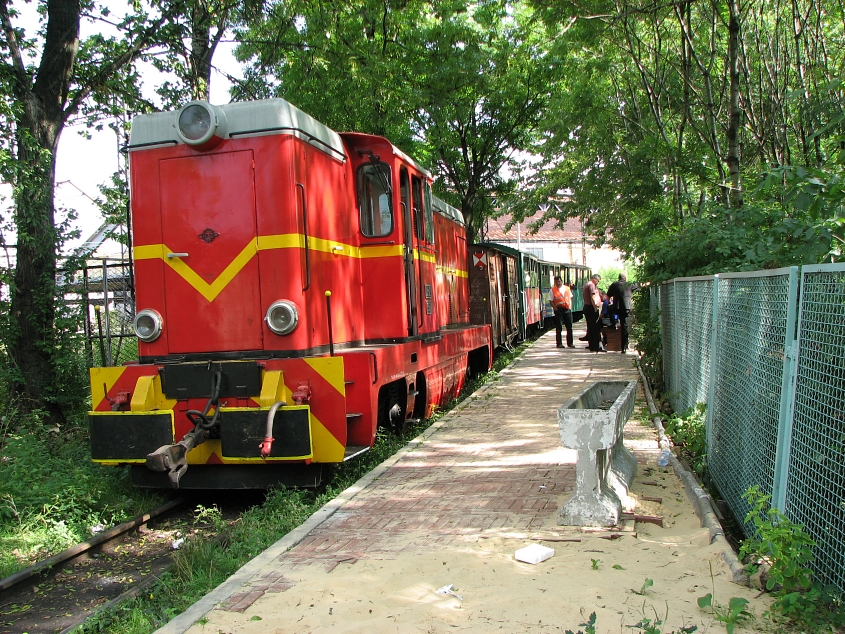
A train of the Upper Silesian Narrow Gauge Railways at Bytom Wąsk. station, hauled by an Lxd2 locomotive

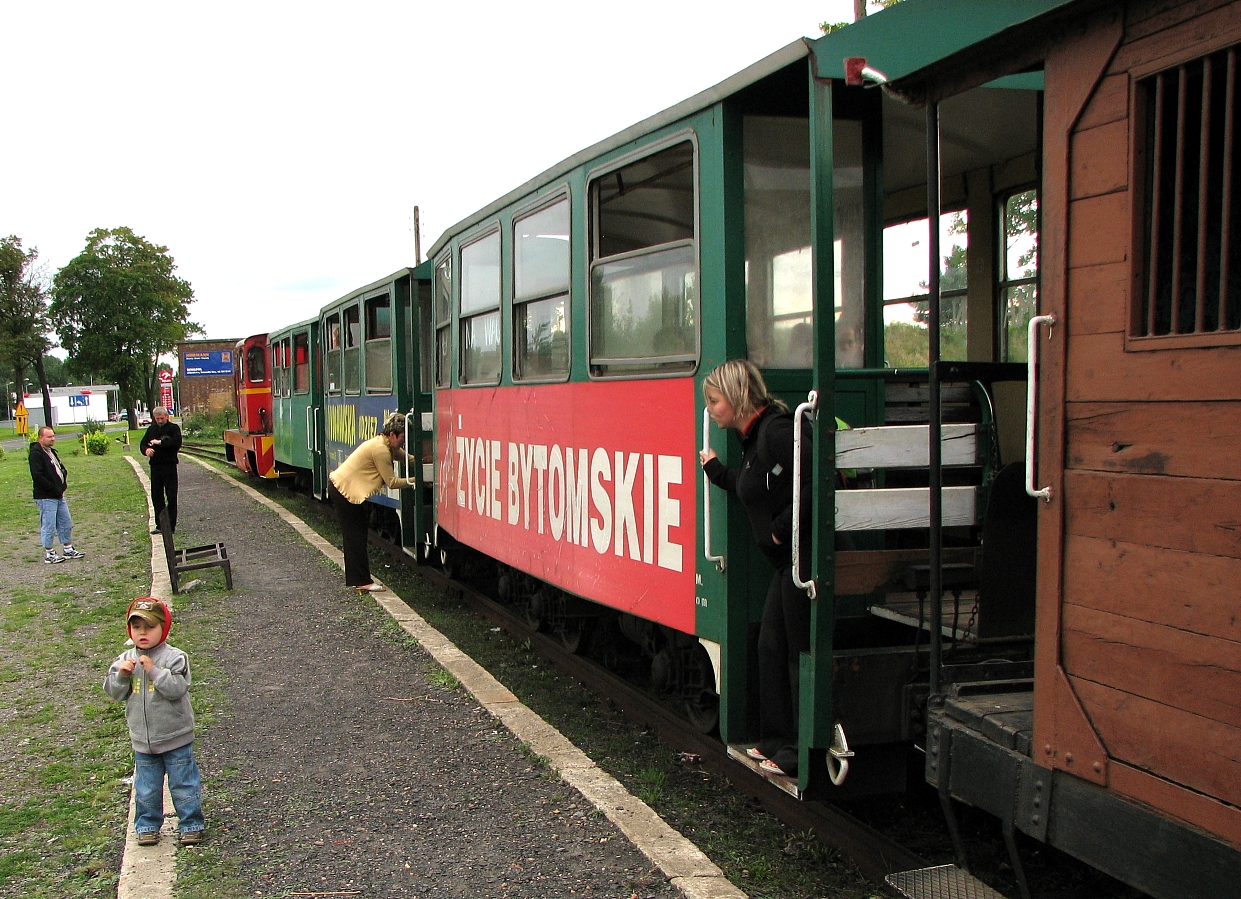
A train of the Upper Silesian Narrow Gauge Railways at the station in Miasteczko Śląskie

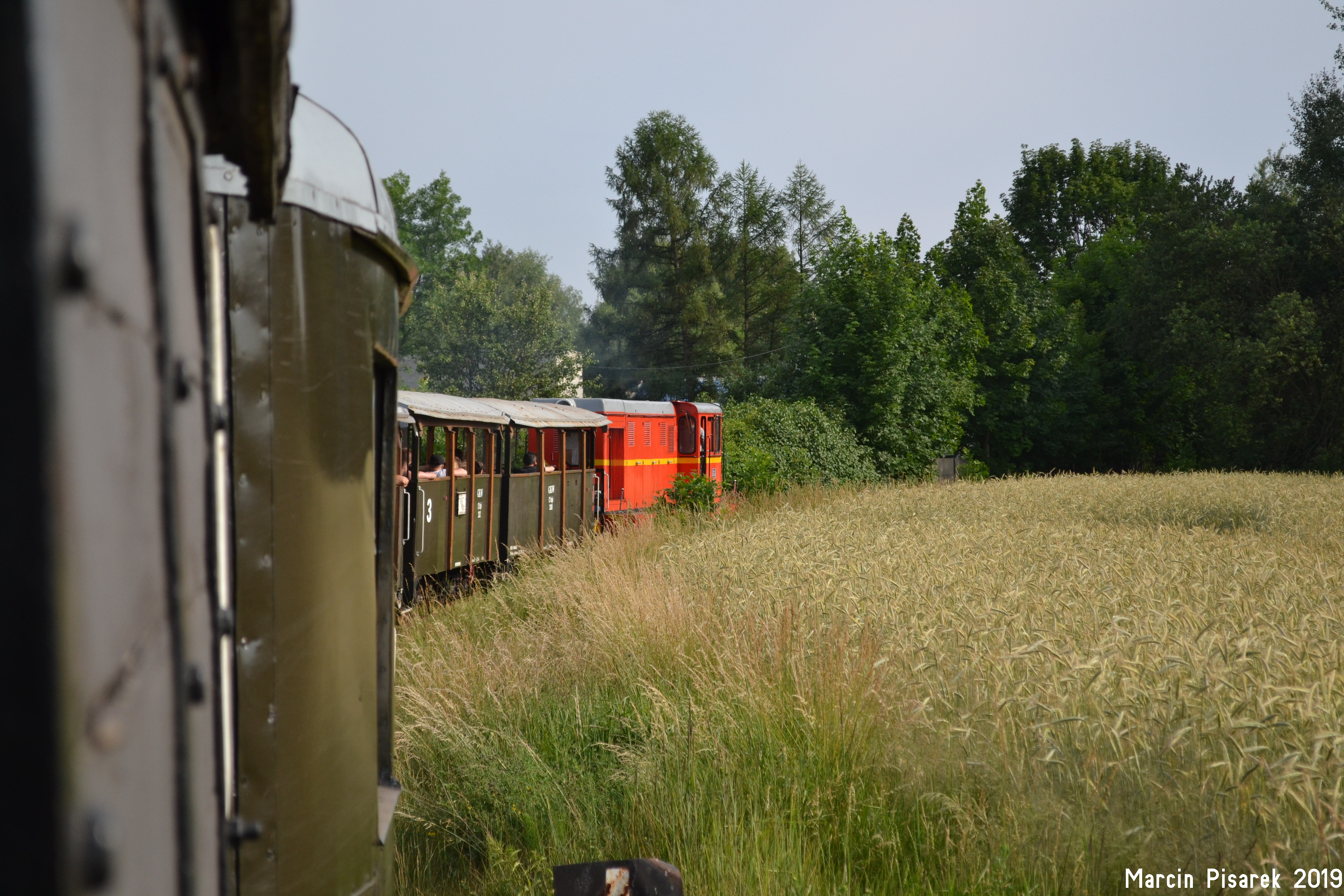
Upper Silesian Narrow Gauge Railways train W-14 on the Miasteczko Śląskie Wąsk.–Bytom Wąsk. route

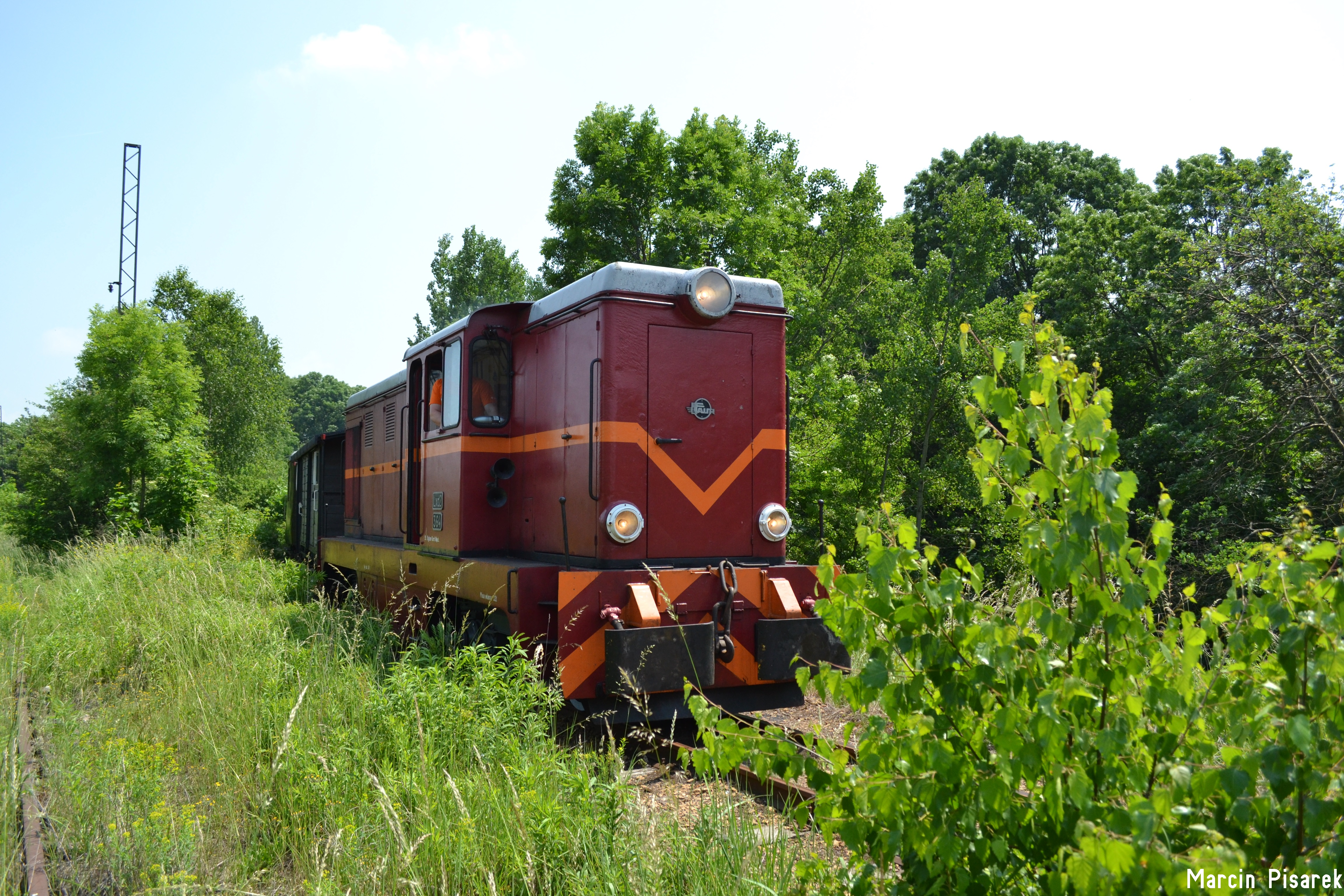
The GKW Induexpress train after leaving the Bytom Wąskotorowy stop, heading towards EC Szombierki

The Upper Silesian Narrow Gauge Railway, (Note: Polish: Górnośląskie Koleje Wąskotorowe; GWB, German: Oberschlesische Schmalspurbahnen; OSSB) nicknamed Rosbanka is a narrow-gauge railway network with a track gauge of 785 mm (2 ft 6 29/32 in) in the Silesian Voivodeship, Poland. Opened in the mid-19th century and originally used mainly to transport raw materials and semi-finished products between industrial plants of the Upper Silesian Industrial Region, the railway now operates as a heritage railway on a 21 km (13 mi) section of the former network between Bytom and Miasteczko Śląskie. The surviving line is promoted as the oldest continuously active narrow-gauge railway in the world and is included in regional industrial heritage tourism routes.

== Purpose ==
The establishment of the railway in the mid-19th century was connected with the insufficient capacity of the contemporary freight transport system, which relied on horse-drawn road haulage. The GKW naturally connected the autonomous narrow-gauge internal industrial railways of individual mines, steelworks and other factories. Independently of the GKW, individual enterprises built their own lines and railway networks, such as the Gliwice Trynek–Rudy–Racibórz narrow-gauge railway and the network connecting plants of the Georg von Giesches Erben company in the Szopienice area. Most private railways had connections with the public GKW network. Some of them, such as the Gliwice Trynek–Rudy–Racibórz line, were organisationally incorporated after the Second World War into the Upper Silesian Narrow Gauge Railways of the Polish State Railways.

The Upper Silesian Narrow Gauge Railways functioned as local railways, meaning that most freight was dispatched to and from stations within their own network. With the exception of the typically passenger-and-freight Gliwice Trynek–Rudy–Racibórz line, the GKW were generally not used for passenger transport. Incidental passenger services were operated shortly after the Second World War between Katowice and Tarnowskie Góry and, during some periods, between departments of industrial plants. On the Rudy line, regular passenger services between Gliwice, Rudy and Racibórz were operated until 1991. In the 1970s, scheduled tourist trains were experimentally introduced between Bytom and the Chechło-Nakło Reservoir in Miasteczko Śląskie. They were soon discontinued, probably because intensive freight traffic, operated according to operational needs, conflicted with passenger traffic requiring a regular timetable, and because passenger demand exceeded available capacity. The idea returned in 1993, when tourist services on the same route were reintroduced. The route was soon extended as far as Siemianowice Śląskie. Today, the GKW operate only as a tourist railway. They are considered the oldest continuously operating narrow-gauge railway in the world.

The railway adopted the standard 785 mm (2 ft 6 29/32 in) gauge, equivalent to 30 Prussian inches, in 1846. The gauge corresponded to 30 Prussian Zoll, with one Zoll equal to 26.154 mm, giving the unusual gauge of 785 mm. Apart from the public and private narrow-gauge railways and their connected sidings and internal industrial railways with a gauge of 785 mm (2 ft 6 29/32 in), narrow-gauge railways of other gauges also existed in Upper Silesia. They served internal industrial transport, such as transport to waste heaps and in brickyards, or operated as surface mining railways serving almost every mining or material shaft. The most common gauges were 600 mm (1 ft 11 5/8 in), 630 mm (24 13/16 in), 800 mm (2 ft 7 1/2 in), 900 mm (2 ft 11 7/16 in) and 1,050 mm (3 ft 5 11/32 in). It was not uncommon for one industrial plant to have several narrow-gauge systems of different gauges. In addition, a narrow-gauge park railway was built in the Silesian Park in Chorzów. These railways were not connected with the GKW network.

== History ==
The first discussions on the construction of an inter-plant network were held in 1843. The Upper Silesian Railway Company was then established and, on 24 March 1851, received a state concession to build two main railway lines, initially horse-drawn. The original network was built between 1854 and 1857. English-language railway writing links the project to an earlier 1845 proposal by Gebrüder Oppenfeld in Wrocław for a local railway serving industrial transport needs in the region, and identifies Rosenbaum, an engineer associated with the Upper Silesian Railway Company, as the engineer involved in that proposal. In 1851–1852, several separate sections between industrial plants were built, with a total length of 35 km. In 1854–1857, two basic sections were built: Tarnowskie Góry–Wirek (25 km) and Bytom Karb–Bogucice–Kunegunda Steelworks in Zawodzie (15 km), creating an organised network of about 75 km. Individual sections were opened successively, and 1854 is regarded as the date when the Upper Silesian Narrow Gauge Railways began operation. The European Route of Industrial Heritage states that construction of the branched 785 mm network began in 1851 and that the first sections were passable two years later. At that time, about 250,000 tonnes of freight were transported annually. A third main line was then built, connecting Rozbark with Chebzie.

The first steam locomotives were introduced on the main lines in 1855, and a year later there were ten of them, although horse traction was still used. According to a specialist account of the early motive power, two steam locomotives were introduced in 1855 and by the end of 1856 ten locomotives were in use, while about 150 horses were still employed on sidings. The early locomotives were built by W. Günther of Wiener Neustadt and were 2-4-2T tank locomotives designed to haul 100 tonnes gross on gradients of 1:60 at 11.25 km/h. From 1860, the railway network was leased by Rudolf Pringsheim, who temporarily withdrew the steam locomotives and left only horse traction. In 1870, freight traffic exceeded 1 million tonnes, and in 1872 steam traction returned to the railway.

On 1 March 1884, the Upper Silesian railways were nationalised and became the property of the Kingdom of Prussia. They were further developed by the state railway administration, the KPEV, under the Narrow Gauge Railway Department of the Katowice railway directorate, established in 1895. At the end of 1895, a connection was opened from Makoszowy to Gliwice and the port of the Kłodnica Canal. The network connected all non-ferrous metal works, coal and dolomite mines and some ironworks located within its reach. In 1899–1900, a tramway company built an independent private line from Gliwice Trynek through Rudy to Racibórz (48 km), on which passenger services were introduced. In 1901, the length of the state-owned narrow-gauge railway lines reached more than 138 km of main lines and almost 30 km of branch lines, while 163 private sidings and internal industrial tracks had a total length of 205 km. The railway had 51 steam locomotives and 3,693 freight wagons, not including privately owned rolling stock, and horse traction was still used on short sections. In 1904, freight traffic amounted to almost 3.8 million tonnes.

The Upper Silesian Narrow Gauge Railways system was divided in several places by the state border following the allocation of part of Upper Silesia to Poland in 1922. Since the management offices, repair workshops and main junctions remained in Bytom, which was within Germany, it became necessary in the interwar period to build additional sections connecting the northern, eastern and southern parts of the network on the Polish side. Unlike most narrow-gauge railways managed at that time by local governments, the GKW came under the state railway administrations of the German Reich (Deutsche Reichsbahn) and Poland (Polish State Railways).

After 1945, as a consequence of the westward shift of Poland's border, the Upper Silesian Narrow Gauge Railways, which had been reunified under German administration during the Second World War, as well as the Gliwice Trynek–Racibórz line, on which regular passenger traffic continued until 1991, were brought under the administration of the Polish State Railways. The GKW were a key element of the local transport system in the cities of the Upper Silesian Industrial Region, and the network covered a triangular area extending to Żyglin and Bibiela in the north, Racibórz in the south-west and Mysłowice in the south-east. At its peak in the mid-20th century, the network was 233 km long. The GKW connected hundreds of mines, steelworks, factories and power stations in the conurbation, serving local bulk freight transport. The Office of Rail Transport describes the railway as a key component of the region's transport system in the interwar period and after 1945. In the peak period of traffic between 1950 and 1970, the annual mass of freight carried by the GKW amounted to 5–6 million tonnes. One English-language account gives 1955 as probably the peak year, with more than 6 million tonnes of freight carried and almost 1.8 million passengers carried on the Gliwice–Markowice line.

During the political and economic transformation after 1989, the Polish State Railways gradually withdrew from operating narrow-gauge railways and began liquidating them. By the end of 1999, the operational length of the network was only 40 km. Under the Act on the Restructuring of PKP, municipalities gained the possibility of taking over railway property free of charge. In 2002, this option was used by the cities of Bytom, Tarnowskie Góry and Miasteczko Śląskie, as well as by Kuźnia Raciborska and Racibórz; in the case of the latter two municipalities, this was a precedent, as no active routes had existed on their territory since 1996. In 2003, the GKW celebrated their 150th anniversary. English-language railway commentary notes that the surviving Bytom narrow-gauge railway is the longest remaining fragment of the former 785 mm freight network and that tourist services began in 1993, while the railway was still operated by PKP.

Only one line remains active today: the oldest historical line, Bytom Wąskotorowy–Tarnowskie Góry Wąskotorowe–Miasteczko Śląskie Wąskotorowe, with regular tourist traffic over a length of 21 km. Its operator is the Upper Silesian Narrow Gauge Railways Association. The narrow-gauge railway complex is listed in the municipal heritage registers of each of these towns.

Traffic is also operated on a fragment of the former Gliwice Trynek–Racibórz railway near the active open-air railway museum at Rudy railway station, managed by a unit of the Kuźnia Raciborska municipality. In 2019, the railway carried 20,700 passengers, and in 2020 it carried 19,600 passengers.

== Heritage and tourism ==
The surviving Bytom–Miasteczko Śląskie route is used as a tourist railway linking urban, industrial, suburban and recreational landscapes. According to the City of Bytom, the 21 km (13 mi) trip takes about 70 minutes and the train stops at ten stations. The route passes the Szombierki Power Station, the narrow-gauge locomotive shed at Bytom Karb, a former quarry in Blachówka, the Historic Silver Mine in Tarnowskie Góry and the Nakło-Chechło reservoir. Bytom describes the train as an artefact on the Industrial Monuments Route of the Silesian Voivodeship. The Office of Rail Transport also identifies the railway as part of the Industrial Monuments Route and notes that the route has been connected with the European Route of Industrial Heritage since 2010. ERIH lists the Upper Silesian Narrow-Gauge Railways within its European theme route for transport and its regional route for Silesia.

The Bytom Karb facilities include historic steam locomotives and narrow-gauge carriages; the City of Bytom specifically mentions a so-called chair car dating from 1912, preserved with its original fittings. In the post-freight era, the railway has also been used for special events connected with the region's industrial heritage, including the Industriada festival.

== Rolling stock ==
The railway used both horse traction and steam traction in its early decades. The first steam locomotives entered service in 1855, but under Rudolf Pringsheim's lease the railway reverted temporarily to all-horse haulage before steam returned in 1872. Later locomotive development on the system included 0-6-0T, 0-8-0T and 0-10-0T steam locomotives, as well as articulated forms. From the 1960s, Romanian-built 450 hp Lxd2 diesel-hydraulic locomotives were introduced; these locomotives remained in use until the end of freight traffic in 2001 and have continued to haul tourist trains.

== See also ==
- Narrow-gauge railways in the Ostrava-Karviná Coal Basin
- Balkan railway

== Bibliography ==
- Niemczuk, Janusz (February 2012). "Wąskotorówką przez Śląsk". Śląsk (in Polish). XVIII (2 (196)): 52–55.
