= Prussian T 37 =

Prussian T 37 DRG Class 99.40
Type and origin
- Builder: Sächsische Maschinenfabrik (2); Orenstein & Koppel (16); Maschinenfabrik Christian Hagans (2)
- Build date: 1904–1912
- Total produced: 20
Specifications
- Configuration
  - Whyte: 0-8-0T
  - German: K 44.7
- Gauge: 785 mm (2 ft 6 29/32 in)
- Driver dia.: 810 millimetres (2 ft 7 7/8 in)
- Length
  - Over beams: 8,520 mm (27 ft 11 1/2 in)
- Adhesive weight: 27.9 t
- Service weight: 27.9 tonnes (27.5 long tons; 30.8 short tons)
- Fuel capacity: Coal: 1.3 tonnes (1.28 long tons; 1.43 short tons)
- Water cap.: 2,500 litres (550 imp gal; 660 US gal)
- Boiler pressure: 13 bar (1.30 MPa; 189 psi)
- Heating surface
  - Firebox: 1.00 m^{2} (10.8 sq ft)
  - Evaporative: 49.21 m^{2} (529.7 sq ft)
- Cylinders: 2
- Cylinder size: 340 mm (13 3/8 in)
- Piston stroke: 400 mm (15 3/4 in)
- Valve gear: Walschaerts (Heusinger)
Performance figures
- Maximum speed: 25 km/h (16 mph)
Career
- Numbers: Oberschlesische Schmalspurbahnen: 9–24; KPEV: Kattowitz 111–130; DRG: 99 401 – 99 408
- Retired: 1939

The Prussian T 37s were German steam locomotives operated by the Prussian state railways. They replaced the smaller 0-6-0T locomotives on the railway line between Beuthen and Kattowitz. In all 20 engines were supplied to Prussia, of which eight were taken over by the Reichsbahn and given numbers 99 401 to 99 408. They were all withdrawn by 1939 and scrapped.

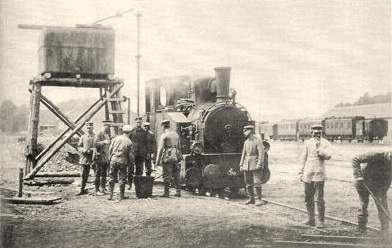
1916

These locomotives were equipped with Klien-Lindner axles at each end. They had an outside frame and the third wheelset was driven. They also had an outside Walschaerts valve gear. The engines could carry 1.3 tonnes of coal and 2.5 m^{2} of water. The coal tank was located behind the driver's cab.

== See also ==
- List of Prussian locomotives and railcars
- Prussian state railways
