= Upper Silesian Railway =

Private railway lines in Prussia

Upper Silesian Railway Stations (1842–83)
| German name | Polish name |
|---|---|
| Breslau | Wrocław Górnośląski |
| Ohlau | Oława |
| Brieg | Brzeg |
| Löwen | Lewin Brzeski |
| Oppeln | Opole Główne |
| Gogolin | Gogolin |
| Kosel | Kędzierzyn-Koźle |
| Rudzinitz | Rudziniec Gliwicki |
| Gleiwitz | Gliwice |
| Zabrze | Zabrze |
| Ruda | Ruda Śląska |
| Königshütte | Świętochłowice |
| Kattowitz | Katowice |
| Myslowitz | Mysłowice |

The Upper Silesian Railway (German: Oberschlesische Eisenbahn; OSE; Polish: Kolej Górnośląska) was one of the earliest railways in Silesia. It connected Wrocław (Breslau) in Lower Silesia with Mysłowice (Myslowitz) in Upper Silesia. The first section was opened in 1842 and the last in 1846, after which it ran until it was nationalised into the Prussian State Railways in 1883.

== History ==
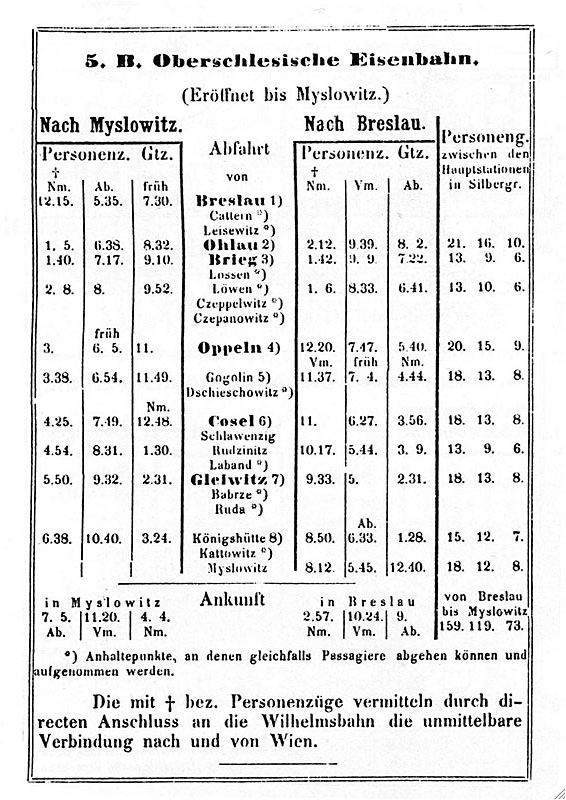
Timetable of the Upper Silesian Railway shortly after its connection to the Emperor Ferdinand Northern Railway in October 1848

First plans for a railway in Upper Silesia date to the early 19th century, but the construction work began only in 1841. The railway was built by the Oberschlesische Eisenbahn AG (OSE), a private company, with support from the Prussian government. Operated by the OSE, the Upper Silesian Railway (Oberschlesische Eisenbahn) was the first railway line in Poland. In 1842 it extended from Wrocław (initially Wrocław Górnośląski) via Oława to Brzeg. The train from Wrocław to Oława on 1 May 1842, the first section of the Upper Silesian Railway to be opened, was also the first train ride within the borders of modern Poland. By August that year it reached Brzeg, and by 29 May next year, Opole. The construction slowed afterward and the next section, to Gliwice, was opened on 2 November 1845, reaching Świętochłowice later that month. In the years thereafter it was steadily expanded until it reached Katowice and Mysłowice by 3 October 1846, by which time the line was declared complete. At that time the line was 196.3 kilometres (122.0 mi) long, and its tracks spanned 104 new bridges.

The line significantly shortened travel times in Upper Silesia: the trains, travelling at 30–40 km/h, took between 5 and 7 hours to traverse the route, while stage coaches took several days. The transport was also much faster than that on the Silesian waterways, and already by 1847 it is estimated that the bulk cargo moved by the railway equalled that moved by roads and waterways.

The Upper Silesian Railway was connected to Frankfurt an der Oder by 1 September 1846 through the Lower Silesian-Mark Railway line, which gave access to Berlin. Shortly afterward, on 1 September 1848, OSE was connected to the Austrian Kraków and Upper Silesian Railway and by 13 October that year, the international Warsaw–Vienna railway. This was the first railway connection between Berlin and Vienna, also linking the two (at that point, both former) Polish capitals of Kraków and Warsaw.

The OSE company was nationalized by Prussia in 1857, as the German government wanted to fix the prices at a low level to speed up the region's industrialization. The company was eventually merged into the Prussian state railways in 1883.

== See also ==
- Wrocław Górnośląski railway station
- History of rail transport in Poland
