= Wałbrzych railway station =

Wałbrzych railway station may refer to:

- Wałbrzych Centrum railway station
- Wałbrzych Fabryczny railway station
- Wałbrzych Główny railway station
- Wałbrzych Miasto railway station
- Wałbrzych Szczawienko railway station

== See also ==
- Category:Rail transport in Wałbrzych
