= Wałbrzych =

City in Lower Silesian Voivodeship, Poland

- City county
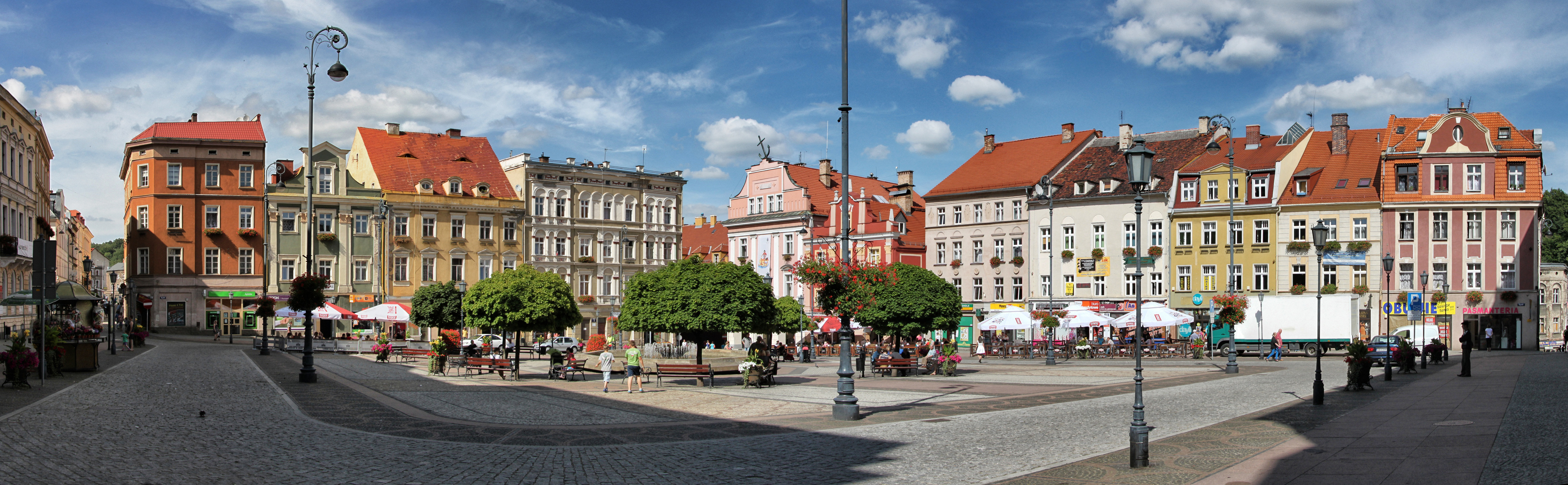
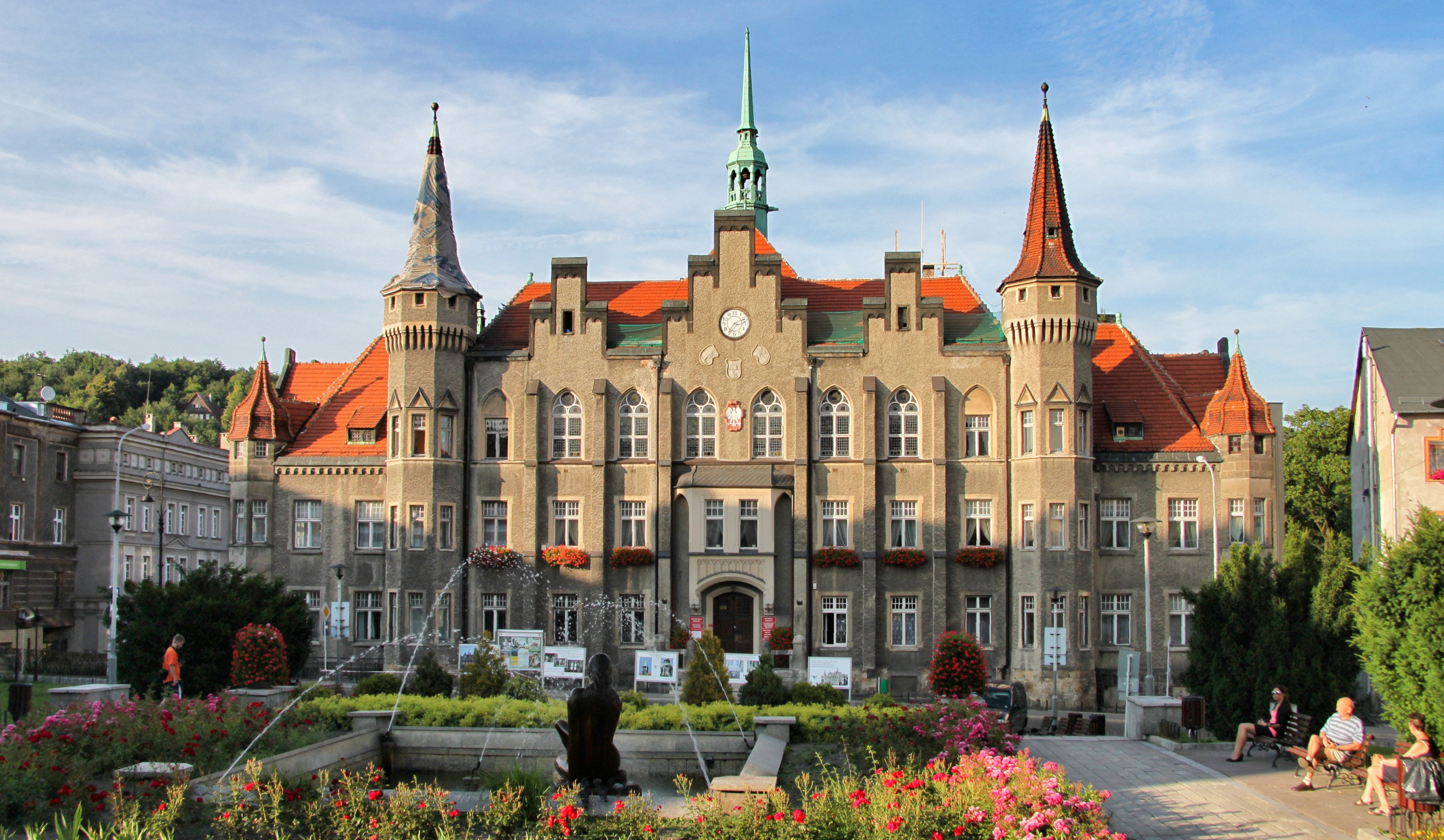
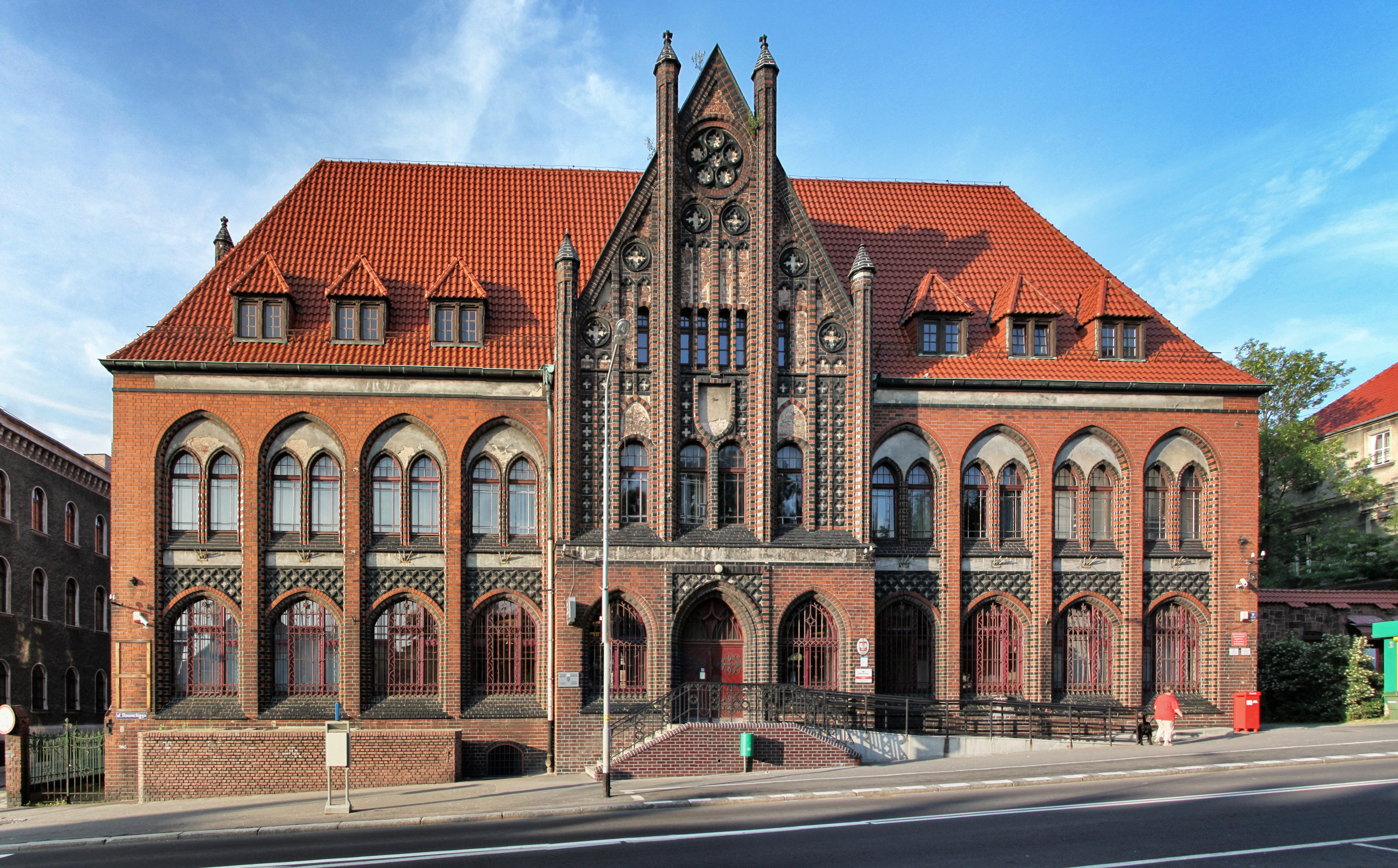
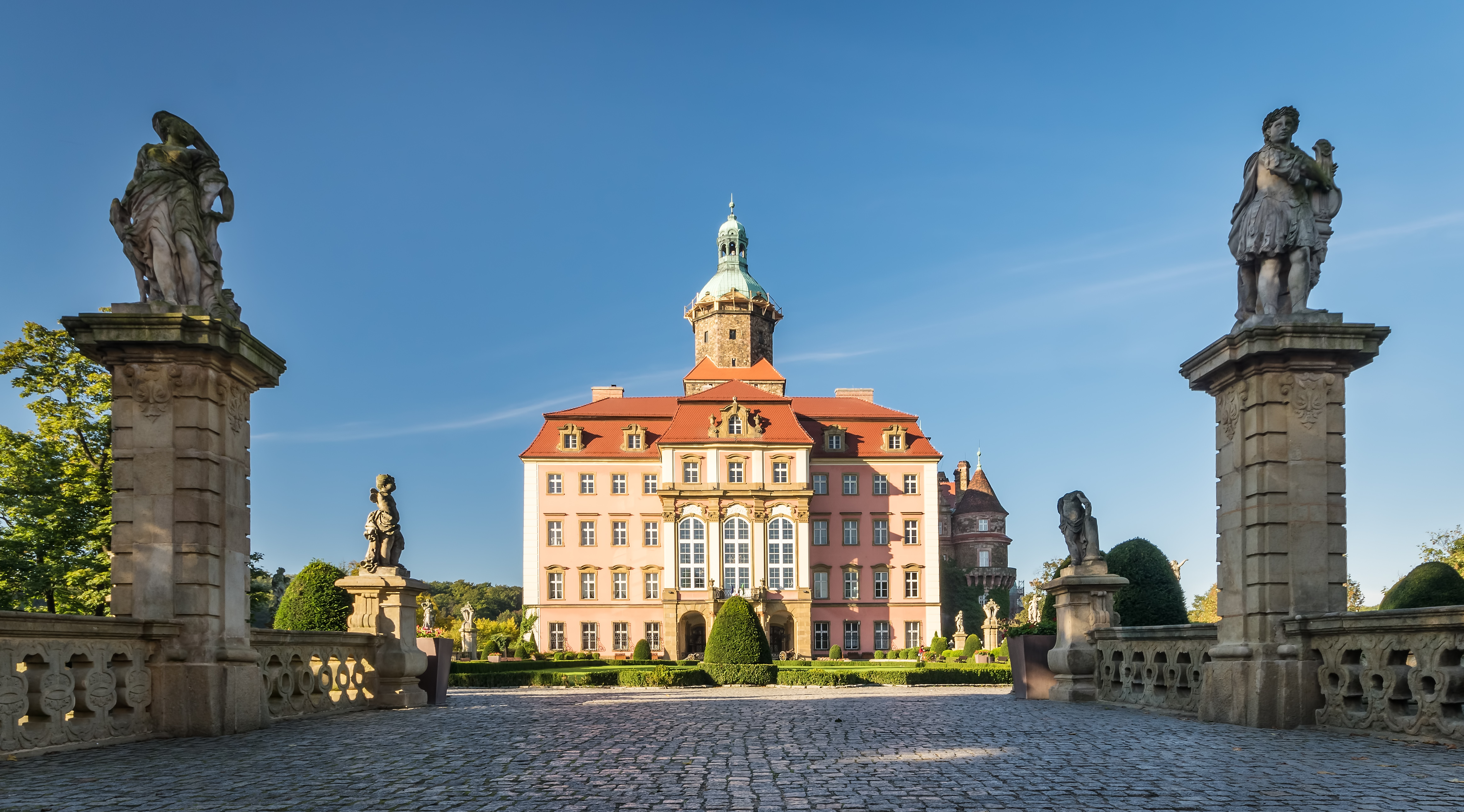
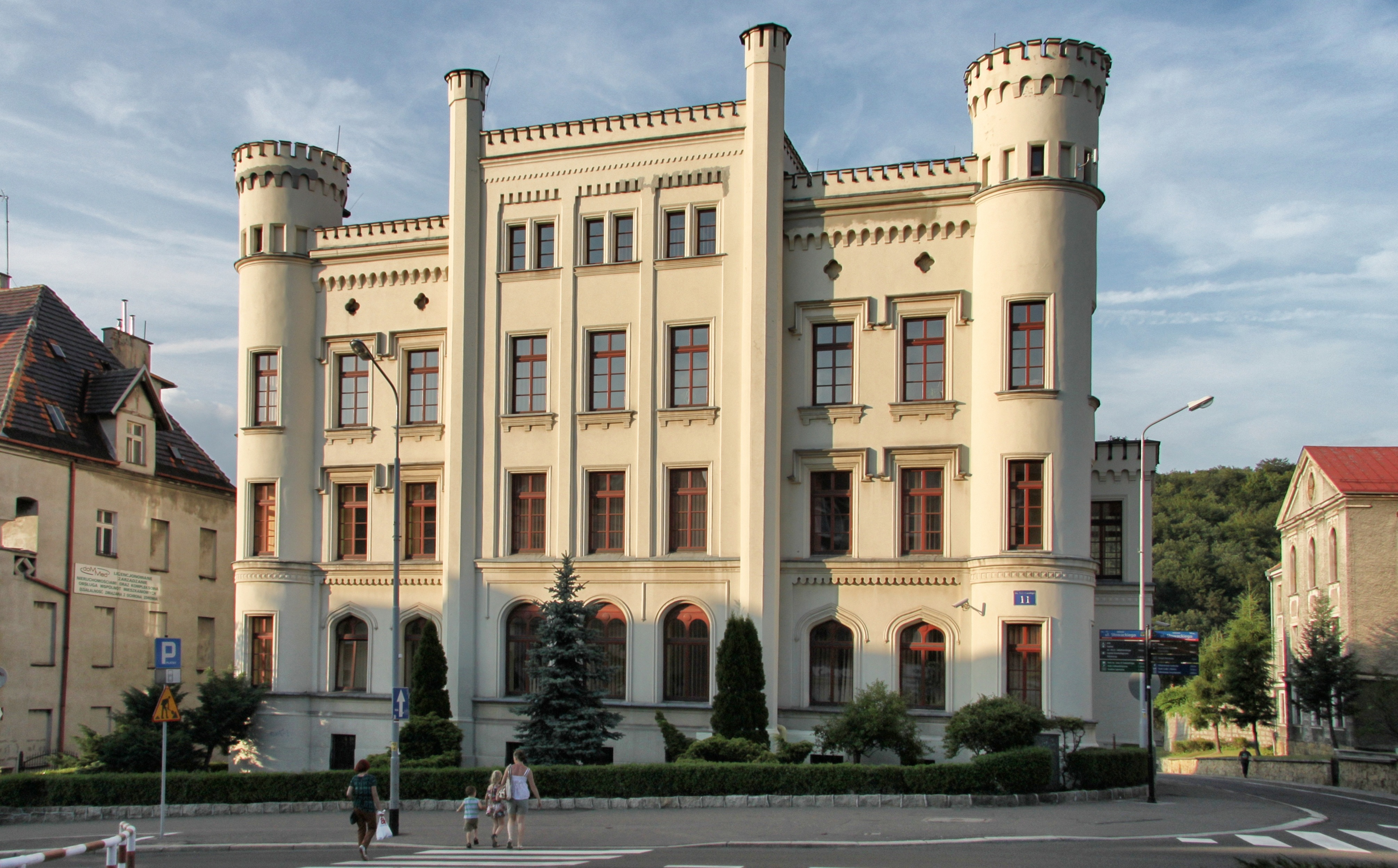
- Market Square Town Hall Main Post Office Książ Castle District Court

- Flag Coat of arms

- Location within Poland
- Coordinates: 50°46′N 16°17′E
- Country: Poland
- Voivodeship: Lower Silesian
- County: city county
- First mentioned: c. 1305
- City rights: 1400 to 1426

Government
  - Mayor: Roman Szełemej (KO)

Area
  - Total: 84.70 km^{2} (32.70 sq mi)
- Elevation: 350 m (1,150 ft)

Population (31 December 2021)
  - Total: 108,222 ▼ (33rd)
  - Density: 1,278/km^{2} (3,309/sq mi)
- Time zone: UTC+1 (CET)
  - Summer (DST): UTC+2 (CEST)
- Postal code: 58-300 to 58-309, 58-316
- Area code: +48 74
- Car number plates: DB, DBA
- Website: www.um.walbrzych.pl

Wałbrzych (Polish: [ˈvawbʐɨx]; German: Waldenburg; Lower Silesian: Walmbrig or Walmbrich; Czech: Valbřich or Valdenburk) is a city located in the Lower Silesian Voivodeship, in southwestern Poland, seat of Wałbrzych County. Wałbrzych lies approximately 70 kilometres (43 mi) southwest of the voivodeship capital Wrocław and about 30 kilometres (19 miles) from the Czech border. Wałbrzych has the status of municipality. Its administrative borders encompass an area of 85 km^{2} (33 sq mi) with 110,000 inhabitants, making it the second-largest city in the voivodeship and the 33rd largest in the country.

Wałbrzych was once a major coal mining and industrial center alongside most of Silesia. The city was left undamaged after World War II and possesses rich historical architecture; among the most recognizable landmarks is the Książ Castle, the largest castle of Lower Silesia and the third-largest in Poland.

In 2015 Wałbrzych became widely known due to the search for an allegedly buried Nazi gold train, which however was not found.

== Etymology ==
The earliest documented mention of the settlement appears 1305 in the Liber fundationis episcopatus Vratislaviensis, a tithe and revenue register of the Diocese of Wrocław. It is recorded there in Latinized form as Waldenberc, the first attested version of the German name Waldenburg (“forest castle”). This name, with variants such as Waldenberg, Walbrich or Walmbrich, remained the official designation until 1945. The Polish name Wałbrzych comes from the German dialect form Walbrich. It became the official name after 1945.

Polish local historiography has sometimes postulated a hypothetical pre-German Slavic name Lasogród (“forest castle”). This reconstruction first emerged in 19th-century Polish national historiography and was popularized after 1945 in regional narratives. However, Lasogród (or any comparable Slavic form) is absent from all primary documents – no medieval or early-modern charter, register or chronicle records it.

== History ==
=== Middle Ages ===
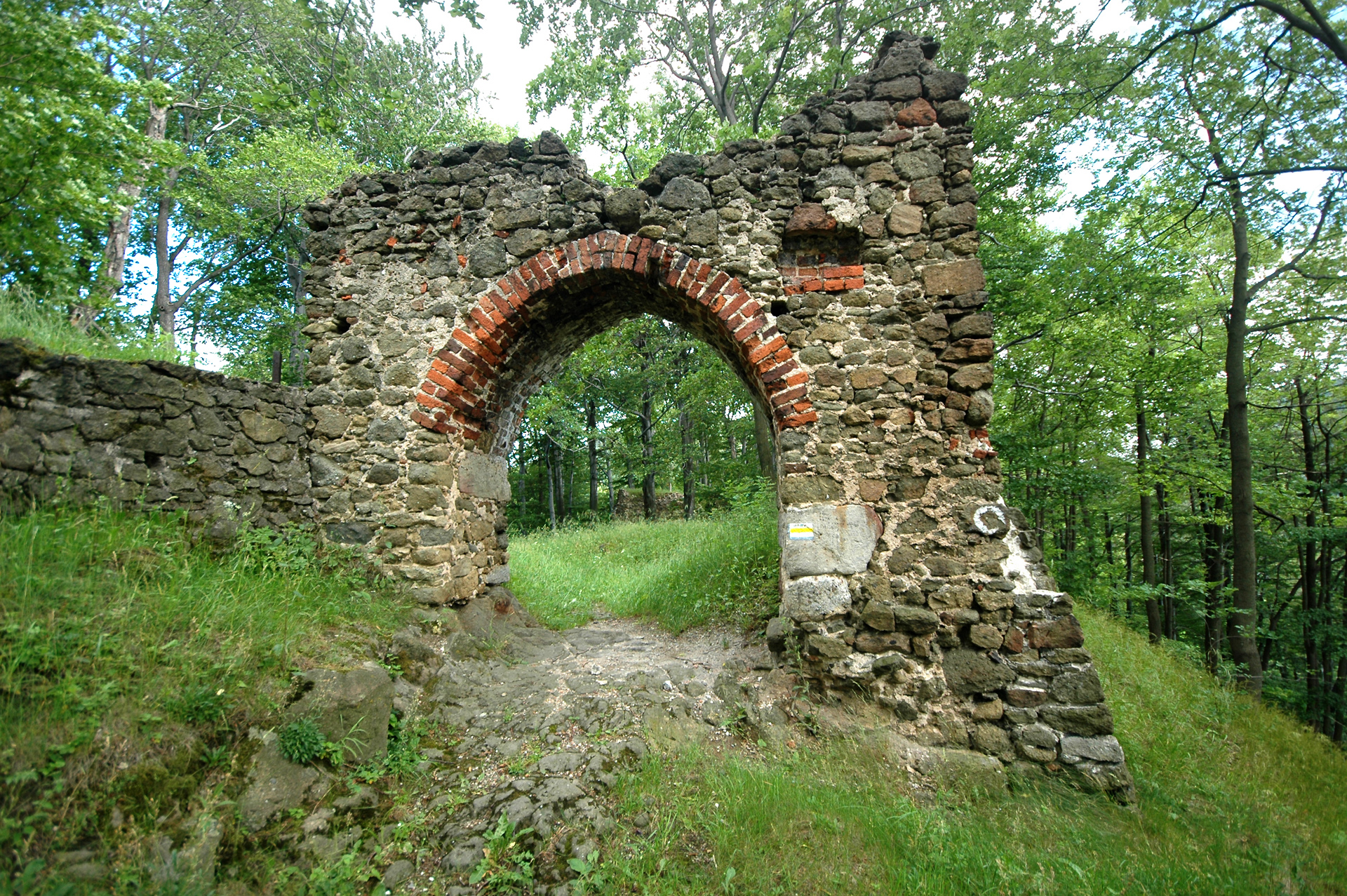
Ruins of the medieval Nowy Dwór castle

The origins of the settlement at the site of the historic town are uncertain. In a chronicle published in 1667, Ephraim Ignatius Naso associated the beginnings of Waldenburg with the year 1191, describing a hunting lodge and a wooden chapel visited by pilgrims. His account has not been corroborated by contemporary written records or archaeological evidence. An earlier settlement, possibly dating from the late 12th or early 13th century, nevertheless remains plausible. The first securely documented reference to Waldenberc dates from around 1305, when it appeared in the Liber fundationis episcopatus Vratislaviensis as a village serving as a local ecclesiastical centre.

Evidence of earlier occupation has been found elsewhere within the present municipal boundaries. Excavations at Stary Książ revealed a early medieval Slavic hillfort, probably established in the late 9th century and abandoned in the early 10th century. The site was occupied again in the late 13th century, when a medieval castle was established there. Within the historic town centre, historical and architectural research has identified the site of a medieval fortified manor of the motte type near present-day Młynarska Street. Its precise date is uncertain, and the remains were levelled in the 19th century. The nearby Nowy Dwór castle was another medieval fortification. The date and circumstances of its construction remain uncertain; it was explicitly identified by name in a document of 1394.

The area formed part of the Duchy of Wrocław during the 13th century and, from the 1290s, of the Duchy of Świdnica, both ruled by branches of the Silesian Piasts. The Duchy of Świdnica-Jawor remained under Bolko II the Small until his death in 1368 and was subsequently held by his widow, Agnes of Habsburg, until 1392, when it passed under the direct rule of the kings of Bohemia. In the later 15th century, Matthias Corvinus, king of Hungary and a rival king of Bohemia, controlled Silesia until 1490 in his capacity as a Bohemian monarch, rather than through its incorporation into the Kingdom of Hungary. The region subsequently came under the Jagiellonian kings of Bohemia and, in 1526, the Habsburgs.

In the late Middle Ages, Waldenburg was a centre for silver and lead mining. The settlement was first mentioned as a town in 1426, but it did not receive the rights to hold markets or other privileges due to the competition of nearby towns and the insignificance of the local landlords. In 1372, Duchess Agnes of Habsburg granted the Waldenburg estates to Reintsch Schaff, a member of the family later known as the Schaffgotsch family. In 1426, Ulrich Schaff sold Neuhaus Castle (now Nowy Dwór), together with the town of Waldenburg and several surrounding villages, to Johannes von Liebenthal. His sons sold the estate to Hermann von Czettritz and his wife Margarethe in 1434. Following several changes of possession in the second half of the 15th century, the estate returned to the Czettritz family in 1492.

=== Modern era ===
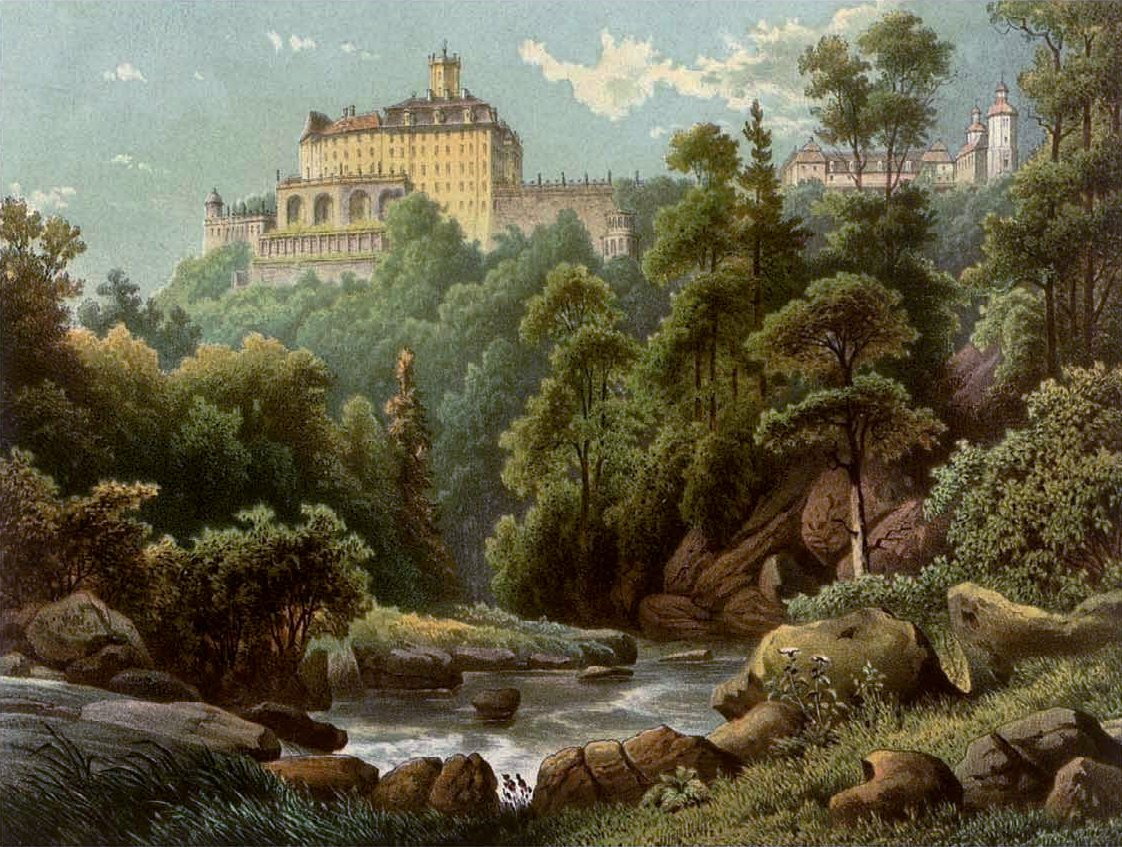
19th-century view of the Książ Castle

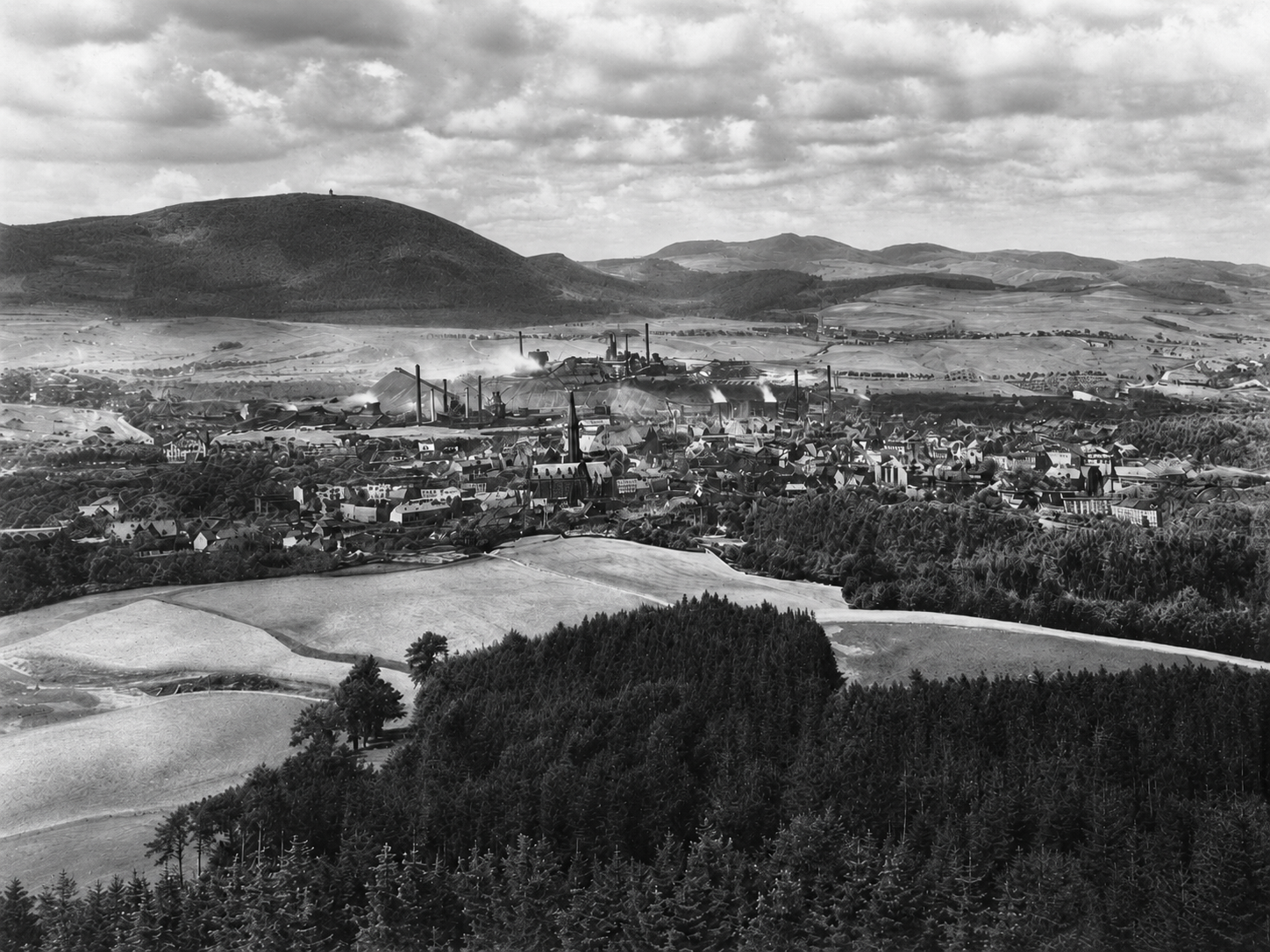
Waldenburg (now Wałbrzych), probably 1925–1930. Taken from Butterberg (now Niedźwiadki). The town, iron and mining industries, and Hochwald (now Chełmiec).

Coal mining in the area was first mentioned in 1536. From the 16th to the 18th century, it was a centre for wool and linen weaving. In 1738, Waldenburg passed into the possession of the Hochberg family, who also held Schloss Fürstenstein (now Książ Castle).

Following Frederick II's invasion of Habsburg Silesia in 1740, Waldenburg was ceded to the Kingdom of Prussia along with most of Silesia under the Treaty of Berlin of 1742, which ended the First Silesian War. From the second half of the 18th century, coal mining became increasingly important to the local economy, driven by growing demand for fuel, shortages of timber and improvements in transport infrastructure.

On 6 April 1793, Waldenburg was the scene of weavers' riots amid widespread unrest in the Silesian linen industry, triggered by high yarn prices and falling prices for linen. The weavers forced yarn merchants to sell their stocks at reduced prices and entered the homes of several merchants. The Prussian authorities deployed troops to suppress the unrest in the region, and a number of participants were subsequently sentenced to imprisonment.

Under the Prussian reforms, Waldenburg gained municipal self-government in 1808, ending its status as a privately owned town. In 1818, it became the administrative seat of the newly established Waldenburg district in the Province of Silesia. In 1843 the city obtained its first rail connection, which linked it with Breslau (now Wrocław, Poland). In 1871, Waldenburg became part of the German Empire as part of Prussia following the unification of Germany. In the early 20th century a glassworks and a large china tableware manufacturing plant, which are still in operation today, were built. During World War I, the German administration operated three forced labour camps for Allied prisoners of war in the city.

=== Nazi rule and World War II ===
In June 1933, Waldenburg had 195 inhabitants of Jewish faith, who were subjected to systematic discrimination following the Nazi seizure of power. Increasing antisemitic persecution led most of the town's Jewish residents to leave before the outbreak of World War II. During Kristallnacht on 9–10 November 1938, Jewish-owned shops were destroyed and the town's synagogue was set on fire. In the early 1940s, the remaining Jewish residents were deported via transit camps in Lower Silesia to ghettos, concentration camps and extermination camps.

During the German invasion of Poland at the start of World War II in September 1939, some 2,000 young men from the city were conscripted to the Wehrmacht.

The first forced labourers, Poles, were probably brought to the city in early 1940, whereas Allied prisoners of war were brought to forced labour in the city probably since 1941. Several thousands POWs, Serbian, British, Italian, Belgian, Soviet, Polish, French and others, were held in various labour camps in the city, including subcamps of the Stalag VIII-A and Stalag VIII-B/344 POW camps. There were also several other forced labour camps, for Poles, Jews, Ukrainians, including camps solely for women, two subcamps of the Gross-Rosen concentration camp, intended for Jews, located in the present Gaj and Książ districts, and a Nazi prison. There are known cases when Polish civilian workers gave food to starving Soviet prisoners of war. The forced laborers made several attempts to escape, and those caught were either beaten by the Gestapo, sent to the Gross-Rosen camp or murdered. The camp in Książ was dissolved in February 1945, and its prisoners were sent on a death march towards Trutnov in German-occupied Czechoslovakia.

It was conquered by the Soviet Red Army on 8 May 1945, a few hours before the German surrender and the end of World War II in Europe. Some 600 prisoners of the subcamp of Gross-Rosen in Gaj were liberated, and some stayed in the city after the war.

=== Post-war period ===
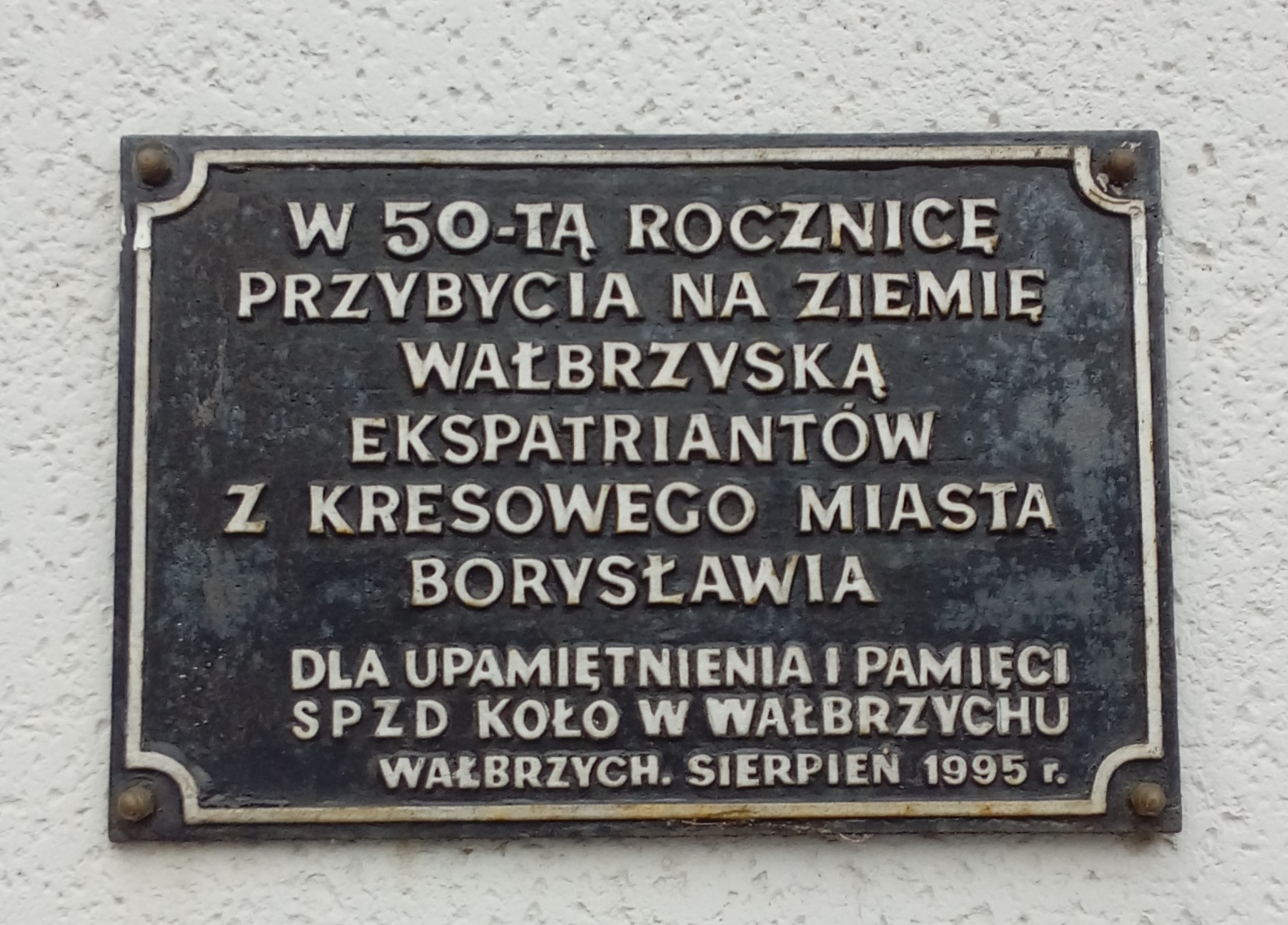
Memorial to settlers from Borysław

After World War II, a previously unknown mass grave of roughly 18,000 murdered Jews was discovered in or near Wałbrzych. On 28 May 1945, the Soviet military authorities transferred the administration of Waldenburg to Polish officials, who introduced the name Wałbrzych. The Potsdam Agreement of August 1945 placed the former German territories east of the Oder–Neisse line, including the city, under Polish administration pending a final settlement of Poland's western border. (Note: The existing border was definitely confirmed by reunified Germany and Poland in the German–Polish Border Treaty signed in November 1990.) Many of the Germans living in the city fled or were expelled. The town was repopulated by Poles, initially those who already were brought to the city as forced labourers by the Germans after the fall of the Warsaw Uprising, then prisoners of the nearby Gross-Rosen concentration camp and prisoners-of-war. Afterwards they were joined by Poles from central Poland and those expelled from former eastern Poland annexed by the Soviet Union, particularly from Borysław, Drohobycz and Stanisławów, as well as Poles returning from France and Belgium and from forced labour in Germany. Also some Jews, Czechs, Romanis and Yugoslavs came to the city. Wałbrzych was one of the few areas where a number of Germans were held back as they were deemed indispensable for the economy, e.g. coal mining. Also nearly 700 Greeks, refugees of the Greek Civil War, settled in Wałbrzych in the 1950s, however, most returned to Greece after 1983.

The city was relatively unscathed by the Second World War, and as a result of combining the nearby administrative districts with the town and the construction of new housing estates, Wałbrzych expanded geographically. In 1951, city limits were expanded by including Biały Kamień, Rusinowa, and parts of Glinik, Konradów, Lubiechów, Opoka, Podgórze, Sobięcin and Szczawienko as new districts.

After the Treaty of Zgorzelec, remaining Germans were treated less harshly and an ethnic German society was established in 1957. The cultural activities however disappeared by the 1960s and the schools with German as the language of instruction gradually closed. The remaining German-speakers had little contact with the German spoken and written language and the local German-Silesian dialect became moribound.

From 1958 to the mid-1980s, the Kleks Poetry Theater, a leading school theater in Poland, was active in the city.

From 1975 to 1998 it was the capital of Wałbrzych Voivodeship. At the beginning of the 1990s, because of new social and economic conditions, a decision was made to close down the town's coal mines. In 1995, a Museum of Industry and Technology was set up on the facilities of the oldest coal mine in the area, KWK THOREZ. In 2001, the Wałbrzych Scientific Society was founded. The 2005 the film The Collector was filmed in and around Wałbrzych.

In 2016, a hoard of 1,385 late medieval coins, Prague groschen of Kings Charles IV and Wenceslaus IV, was found on the border of Wałbrzych and Boguszów-Gorce. The hoard may have been hidden after 1420 during the Hussite Wars. It is one of the largest groschen hoards found in Poland.

== Geography ==
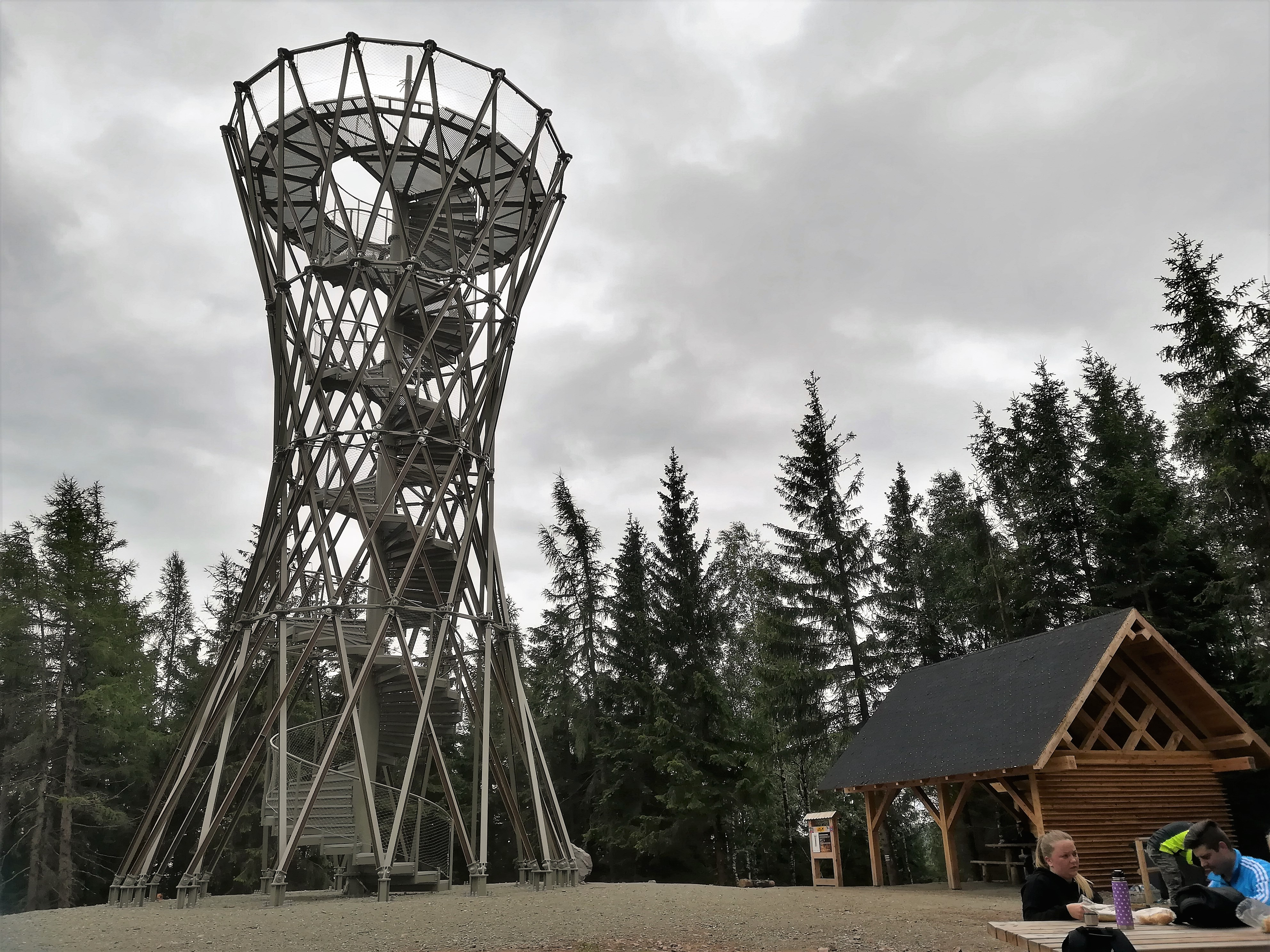
An observation tower and a tourist shed on Mount Borowa

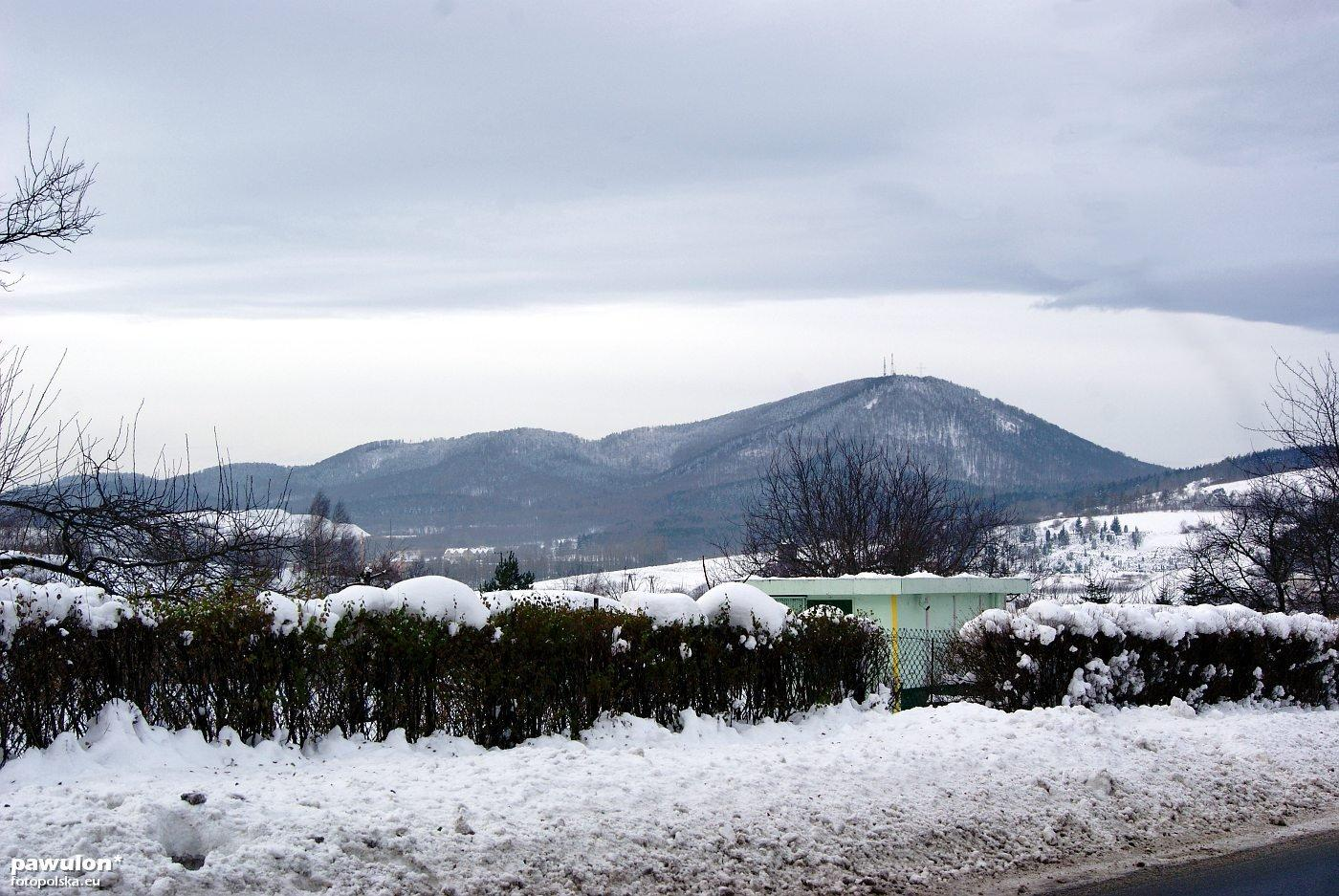
Chełmiec (851m above sea level) a dominant mountain over the city

Wałbrzych is located in the Central Sudeten Mountains, near the border with the Czech Republic and Germany. The city is located by the Pełcznica River at 450–500 m above sea level in a picturesque structural basin of Wałbrzych above which there are wooded ranges of the Wałbrzych Mountains. The highest elevation in the city is Mount Borowa, also known as the Black Mountain, 853 m (2798 ft) above sea level, with an observation tower since 2007, which is the highest peak of the Wałbrzych mountains.

There are seven city parks in the city, and in the main city park (King Jan III Sobieski Park) is the only mountain shelter in Poland, located in the city center PTTK Harcówka.

=== Nature protection ===
Protected areas in Wałbrzych

- Książ Landscape Park – northern outskirts of the city
- Przełomy pod Książem Nature reserve – northern outskirts of the city
- Sudety Wałbrzyskie Landscape Park – southern outskirts of the city
- Chełmiec Mountain Natura 2000 area – western outskirts of the city

There are several natural monuments in the city; among them is the coat of arms oak, a descendant of the oak which was the inspiration for the coat of arms of the city, as evidenced by a nearby stone with the inscription "Stadteiche gapflanzt 1933 antstelle der Wappeneiche" ('City oak planted in 1933 in place of the coat of arms oak'). The mildest winter in the city was in 2006/2007 and 1992/1993.

== Sights ==
Sights of Wałbrzych (examples)

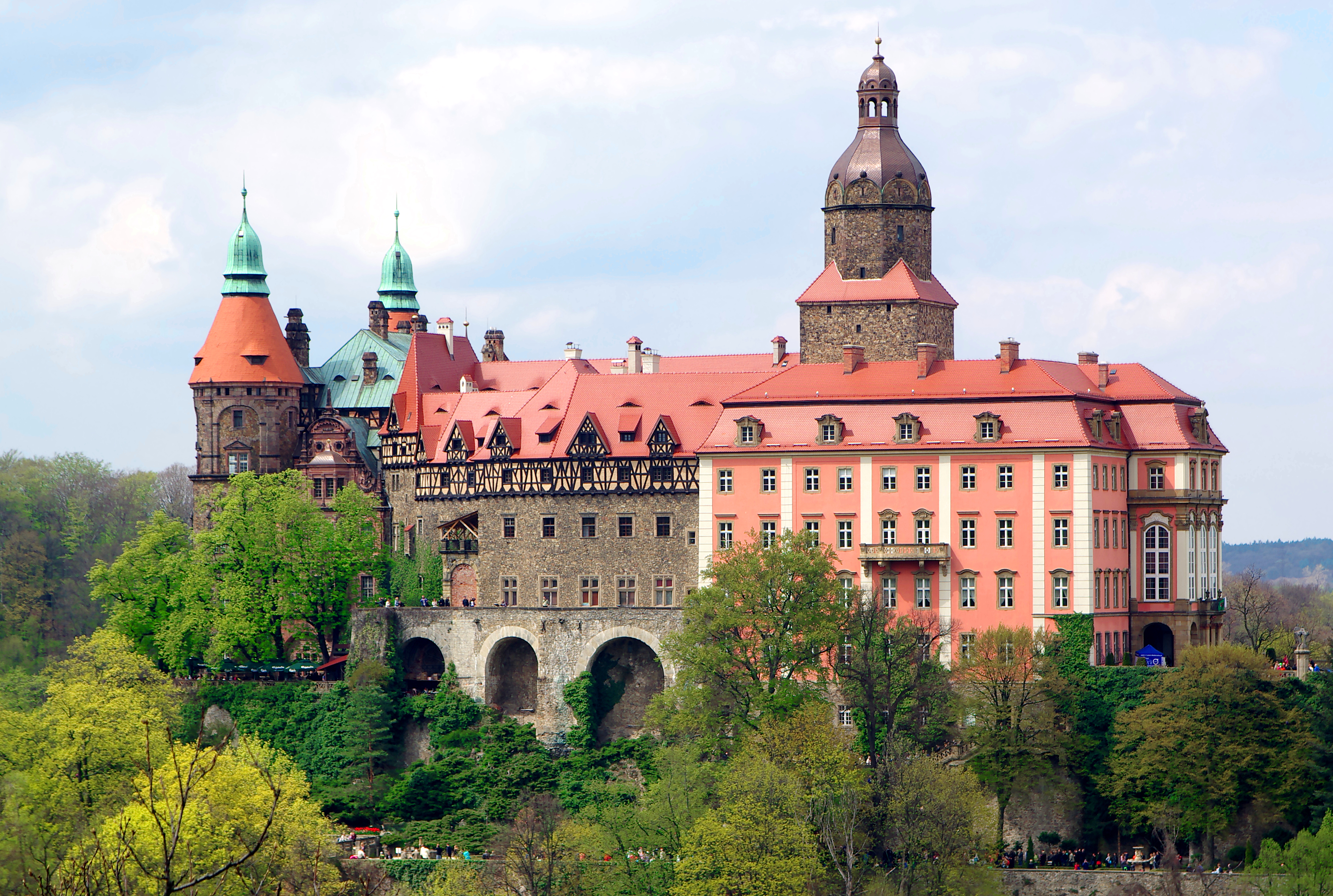
Książ Castle

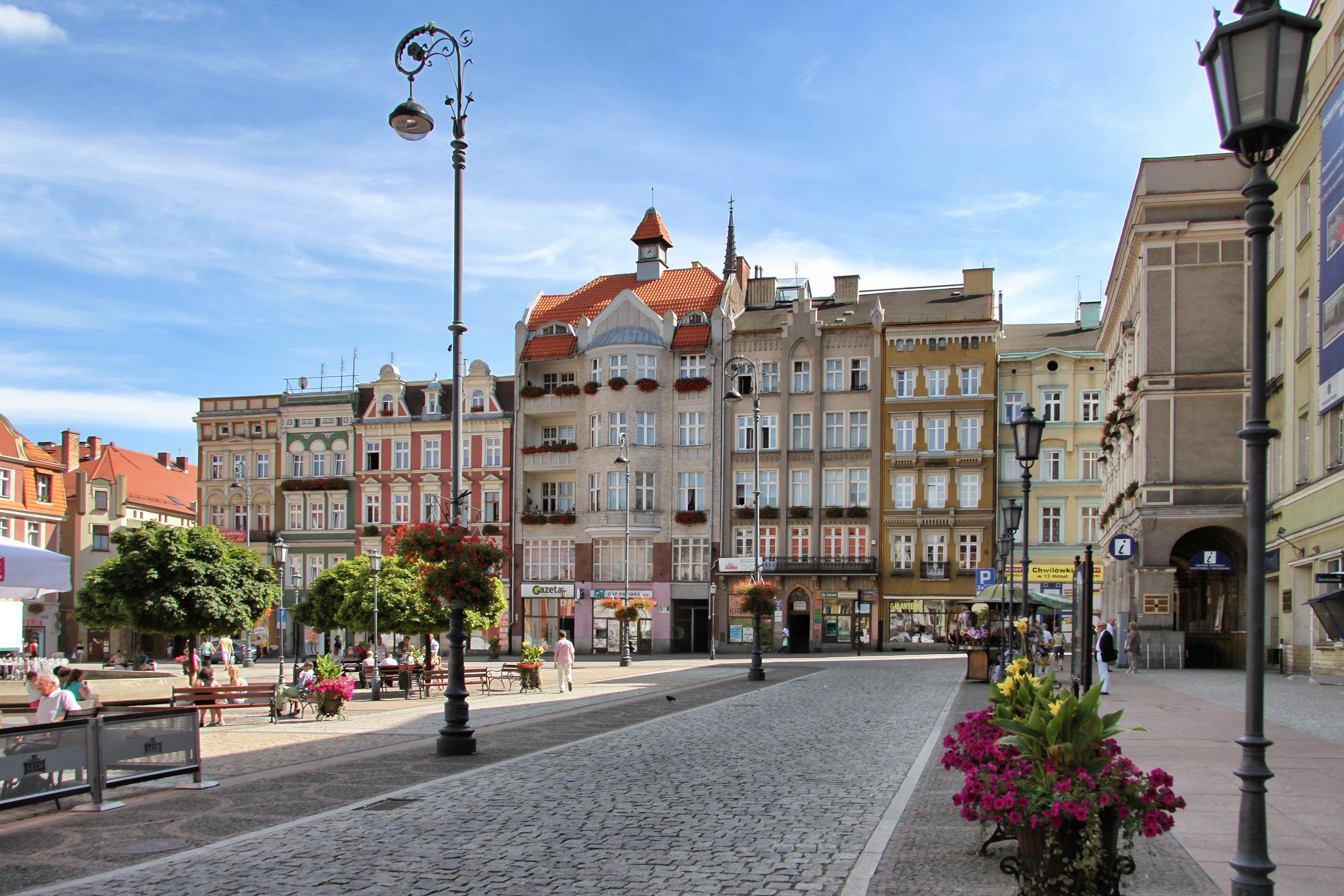
Rynek (Market Square)

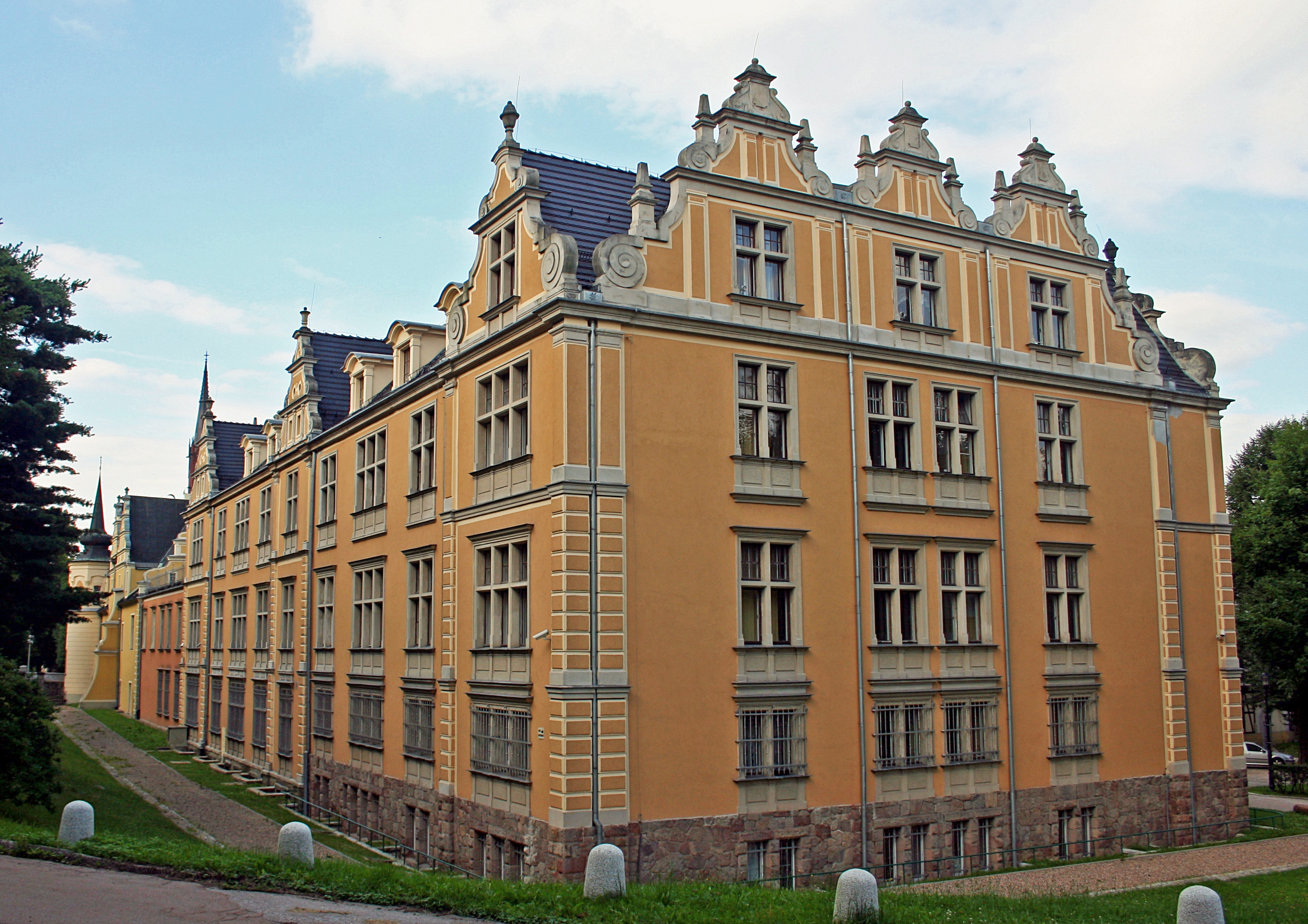
Czettritz Castle- Angelus Silesius State College

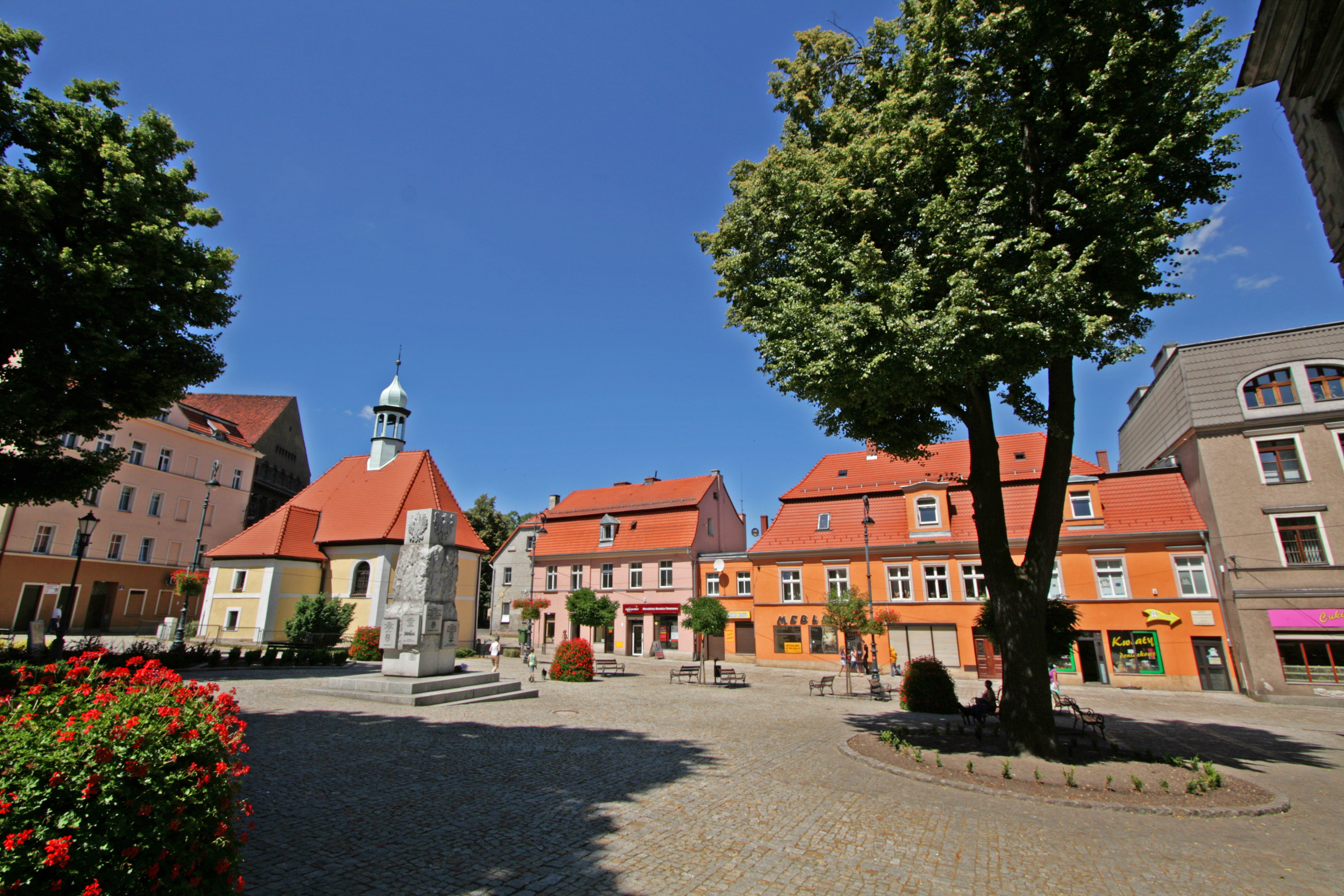
Plac Kościelny (Church Square) with the Our Lady of Sorrows church

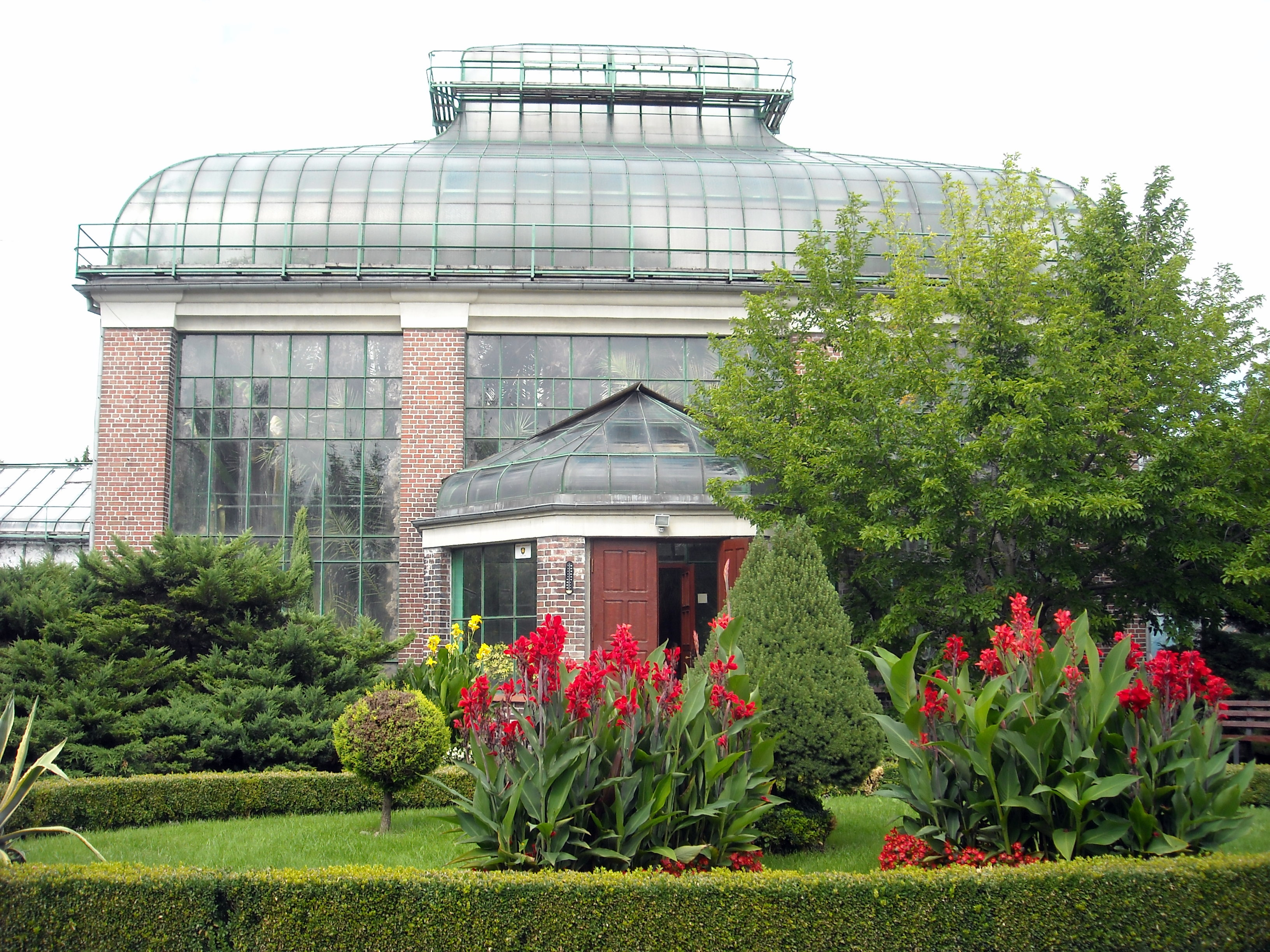
Palm House

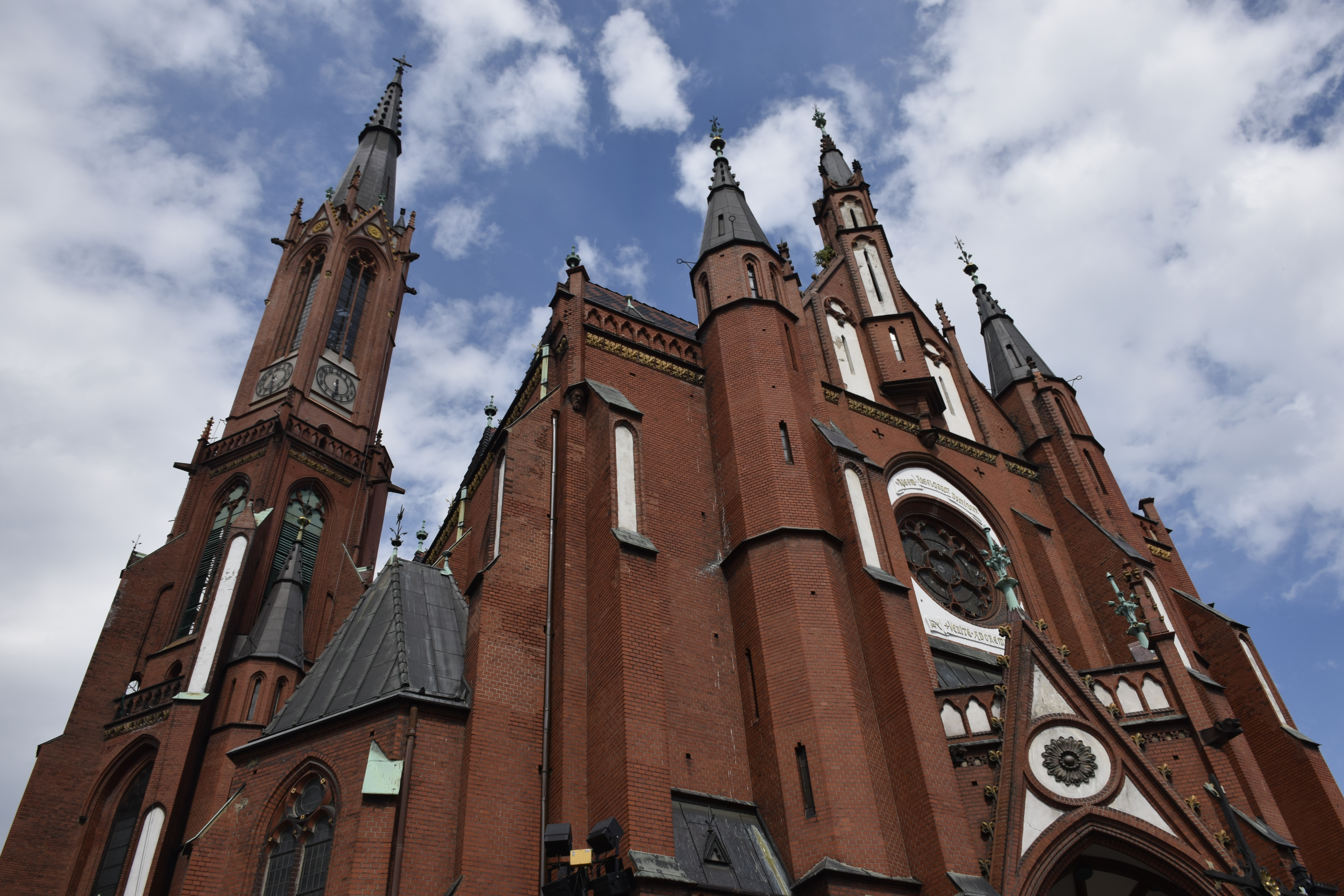
Holy Guardian Angels church

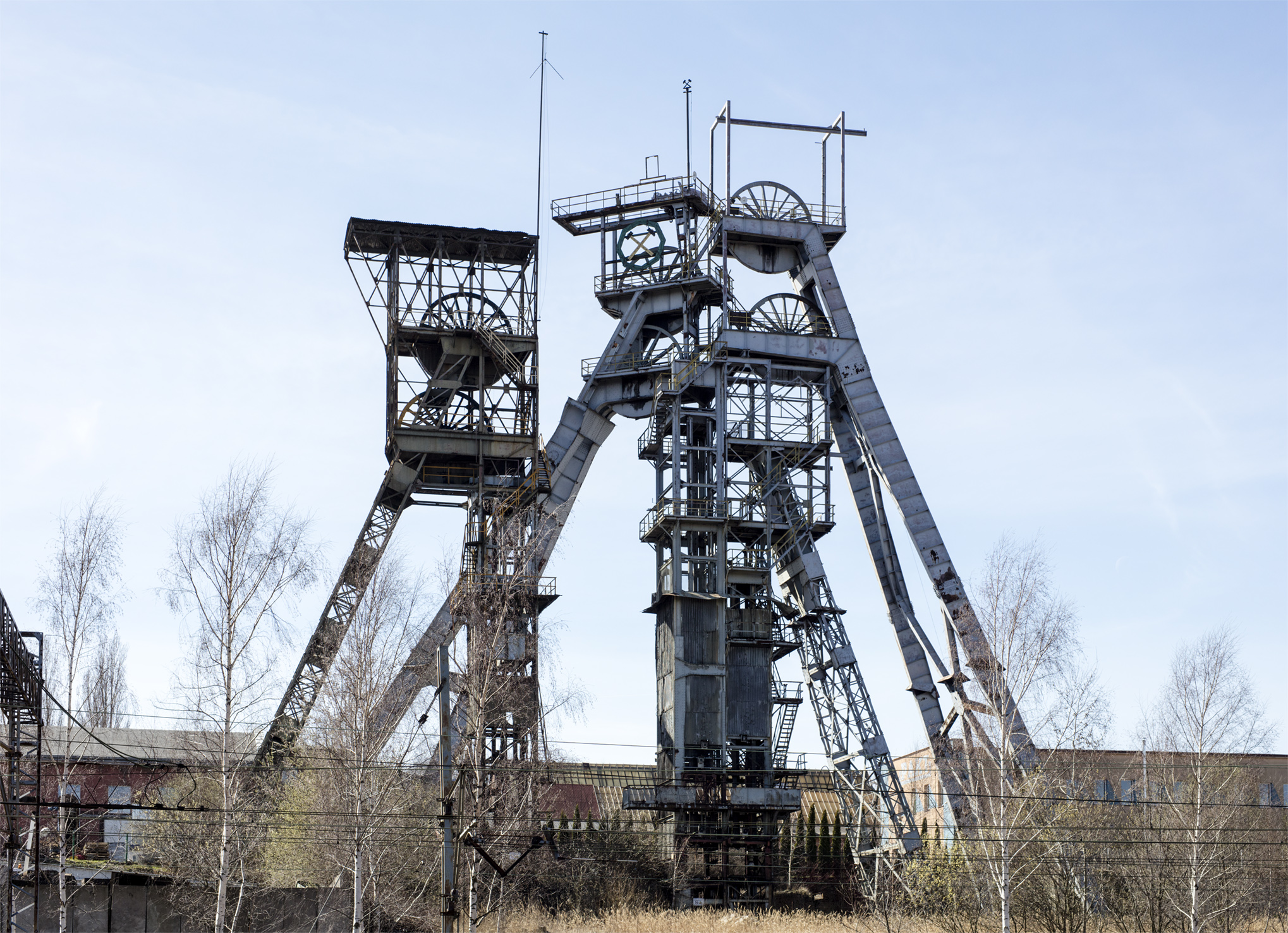
One of the symbols of the city - the unique mining towers Bolesław Chrobry

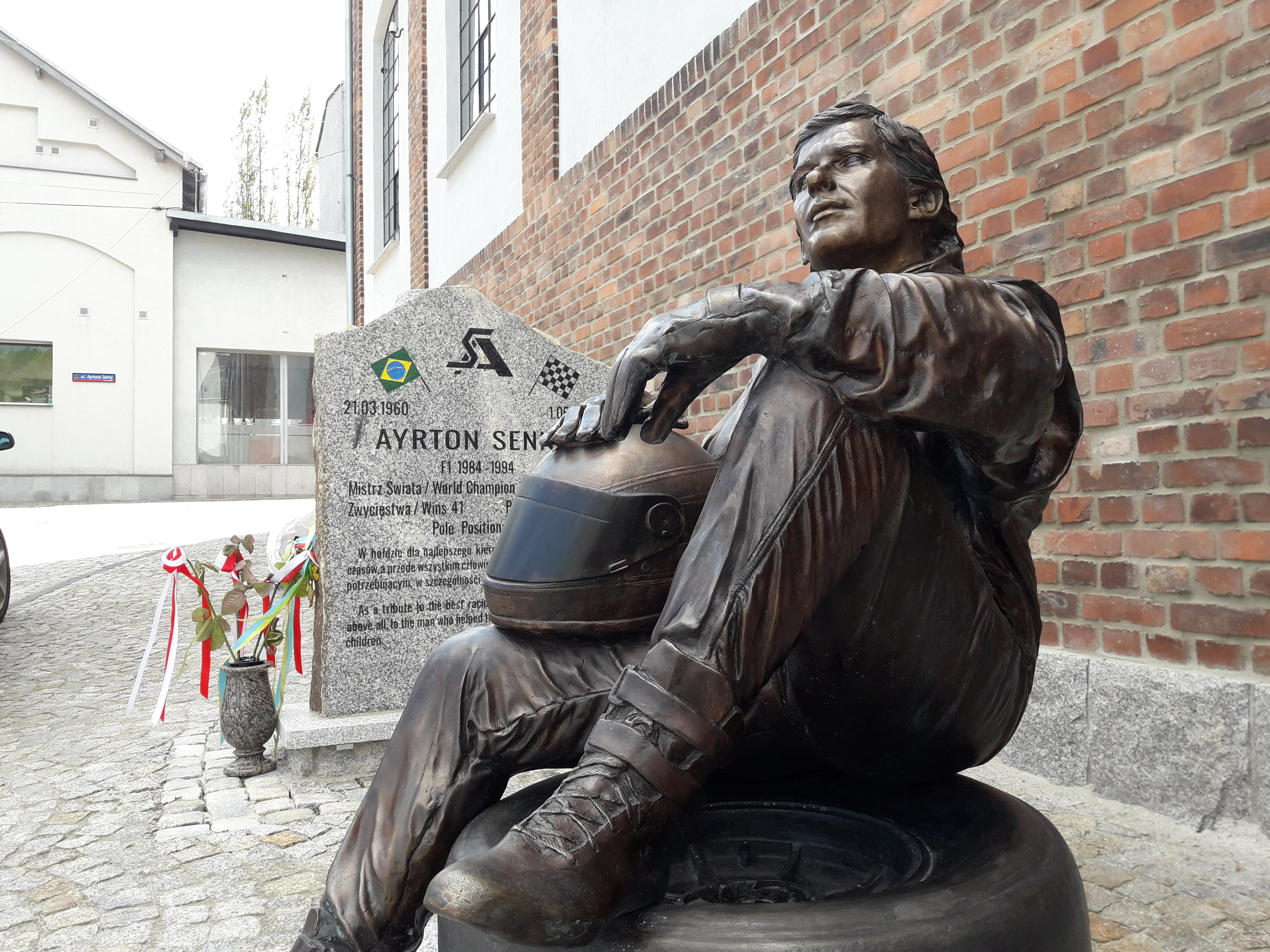
Ayrton Senna's statue

- Książ Castle, the largest Silesian castle, the third-largest castle in Poland behind Kraków's Wawel Castle and the Malbork Castle
- Old Książ Castle (Stary Książ). Gothic ruins opposite (across a valley) Książ Castle
- Nowy Dwór Castle. The ruins of the castle Nowy Dwór (Ogorzelec) are on the top of Castle Hill (618 m)
- Czettritz Castle (1604–1628), now the Angelus Silesius State College
- Sanctuary of Our Lady of Sorrows. Gothic church, rebuilt into a Baroque style. Sanctuary of Our Lady of Sorrows placed in the center of Wałbrzych and is the oldest building of the city, called by the inhabitants "the heart of the city"
- Town Hall (Ratusz). A representative three-storey building maintained in the style of historical eclecticism, imitating gothic
- Market square (renovated 1997–1999). A place where a weekly market took place in the past. In the years 1731-1853 its center was occupied by the Baroque town hall.
- Palmiarnia (Palm House)
- Museum of Porcelain in the old Alberti Palace
- Guardian Angels Church. Built in 1898 in the neo-Gothic style, in place of a previous church.
- Protestant church. Designed in the years 1785-1788 by Carl Gotthard Langhans, the founder of the Berlin Brandenburg Gate
- Mausoleum in Wałbrzych. A 1938 monument designed by Robert Tischler to commemorate the Silesian dead of World War I, as well as 23 early Nazis from Silesia. The structure is a four-sided fortalice measuring 24 metres (79 ft) by 27 metres (89 ft), with walls 6 metres (20 ft) tall. A metal torch on a tall column once at the center of the courtyard was designed by Ernst Geiger. The site is locally rumored to have been used for Nazi SS occult rituals.
- Railway tunnel under the Little Wołowiec mountain. Counting 1,601 m (5,253 ft) is the longest railway tunnel in Poland
- Mountain Borowa (black mountain). The highest mountain in the Wałbrzyskie Mountains, with observation tower.
- Mountain Chełmiec. The second largest peak in the area. A monumental mountain in the shape of a dome that dominates the city. At the top there is an observation tower, 45 meter cross, and two radio-television masts
- Old Mine – Center for Science and the Arts (Stara Kopalnia - Centrum Nauki i Sztuki)is the biggest post-industrial tourist attraction in Poland, located in the former bituminous coal mine – Kopalnia Węgla Kamiennego "Julia" ("Thorez"). It covers the area of 4.5 hectares of historic post-industrial objects with authentic equipment, such as a machine park which has been secured and made accessible for visitors.
- Mining monuments in the city have been a lot of post-mining objects, among others, buildings, halls and mining towers.
- Mining and Motorsports Museum at the Ayrton Senna street.
- Ayrton Senna's statue located next to the Mining and Motorsports Museum at the Ayrton Senna street.

== Transport ==
Railway stations in Wałbrzych

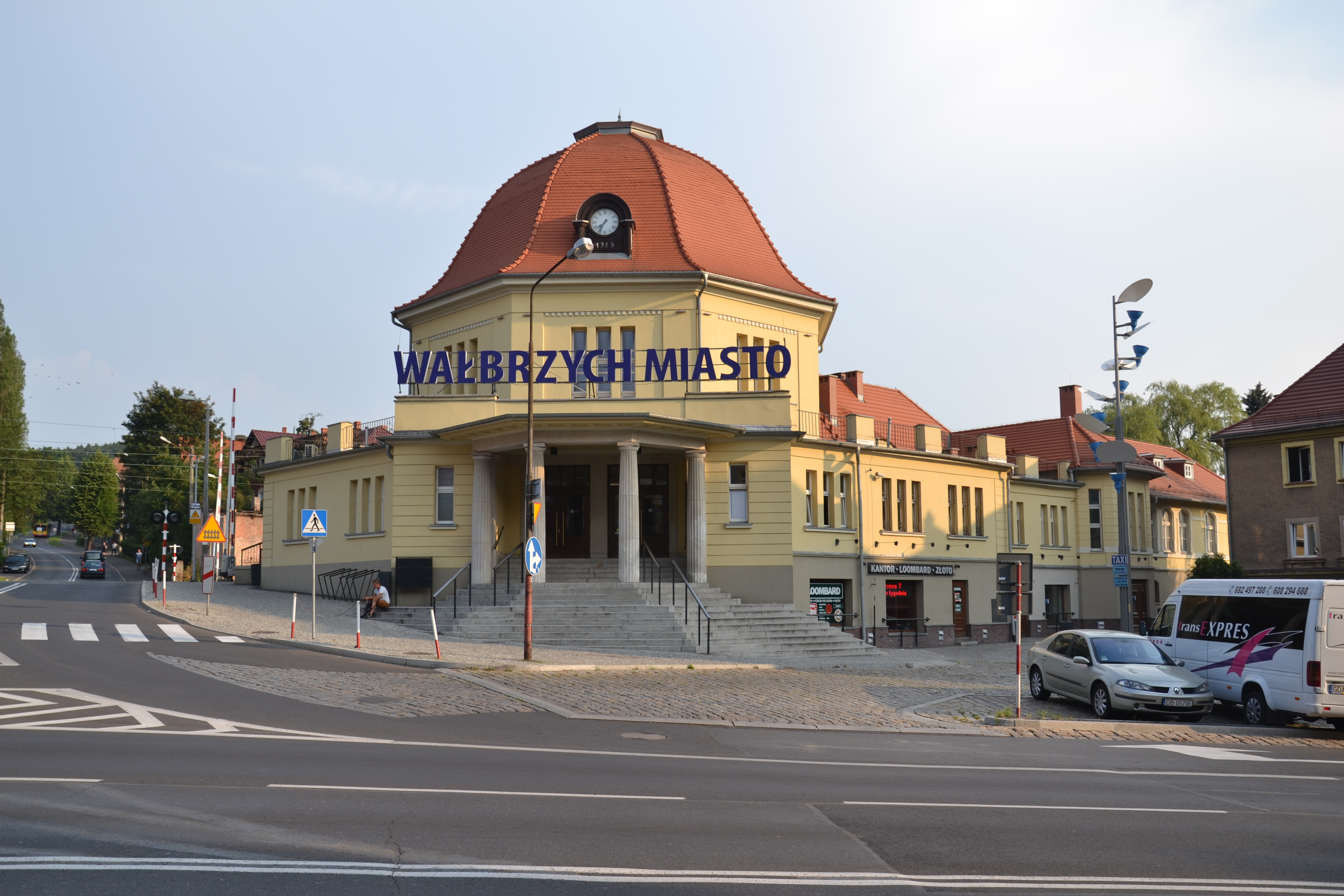
Wałbrzych Miasto

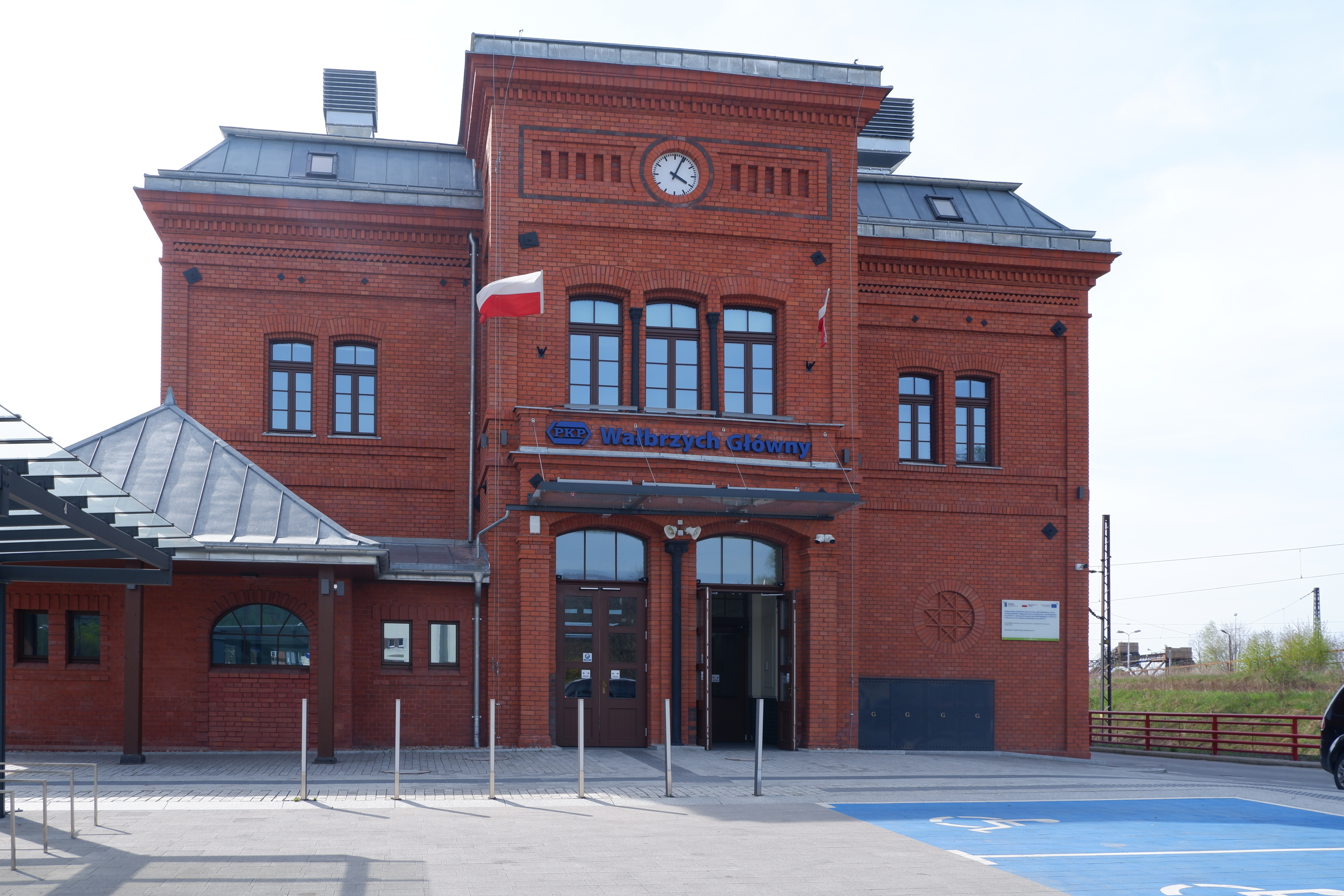
Wałbrzych Główny

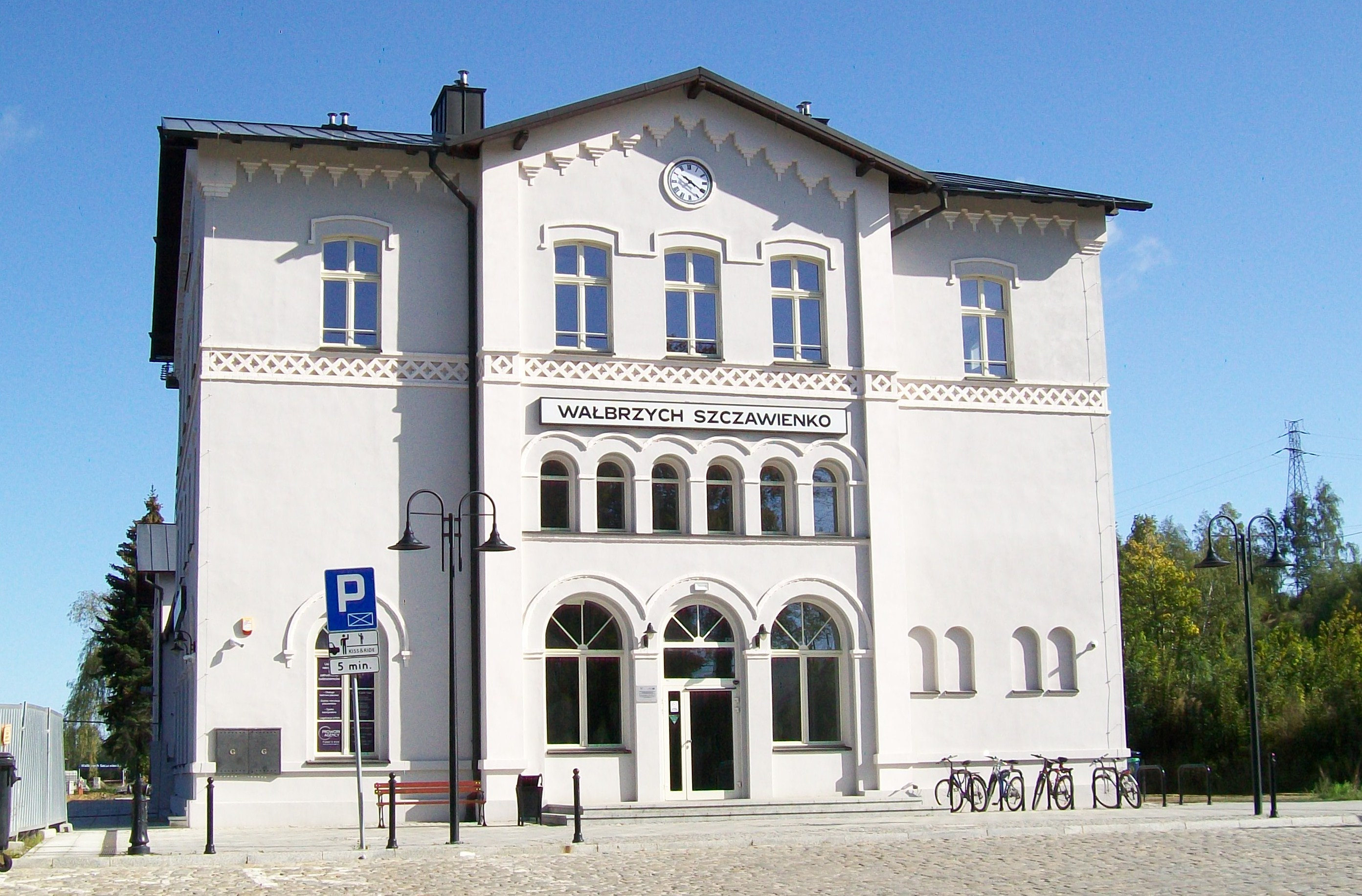
Wałbrzych Szczawienko

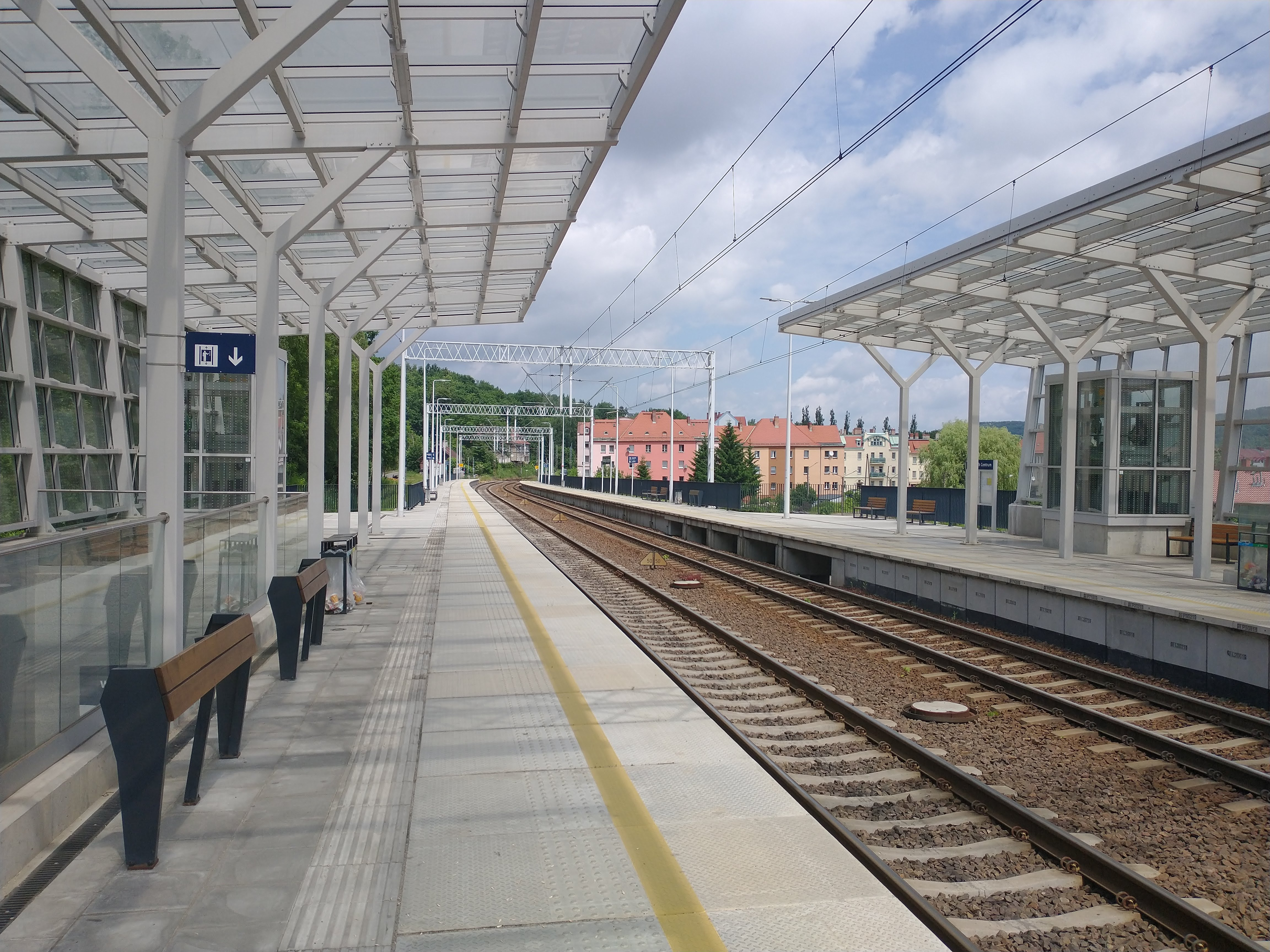
Wałbrzych Centrum

=== Roads ===
National roads

(A4 autostrada/ Bielany Wrocławskie-Świdnica-Wałbrzych-Golińsk- Czech border)

Voivodeship roads

=== Public transport ===
There are 14 bus lines in the city

=== Rail ===
There are two main directions of passenger railways in the city, which include:

- Wrocław Świebodzki–Zgorzelec railway
- Kłodzko–Wałbrzych railway

There are railway stations throughout the city: Wałbrzych Miasto, Wałbrzych Fabryczny, Wałbrzych Szczawienko, Wałbrzych Centrum, and Wałbrzych Główny, from which from May to the end of September, the starting station for weekend holiday connections to Meziměstí / Adršpach-Teplice Rocks in the Czech Republic.

=== Aviation ===
The nearest airport is Wrocław airport located 70 km (43 mi) from the city, in the closer distance, about 10 km (6 mi), is located light aircraft landing ground in Świebodzice.

== City districts ==
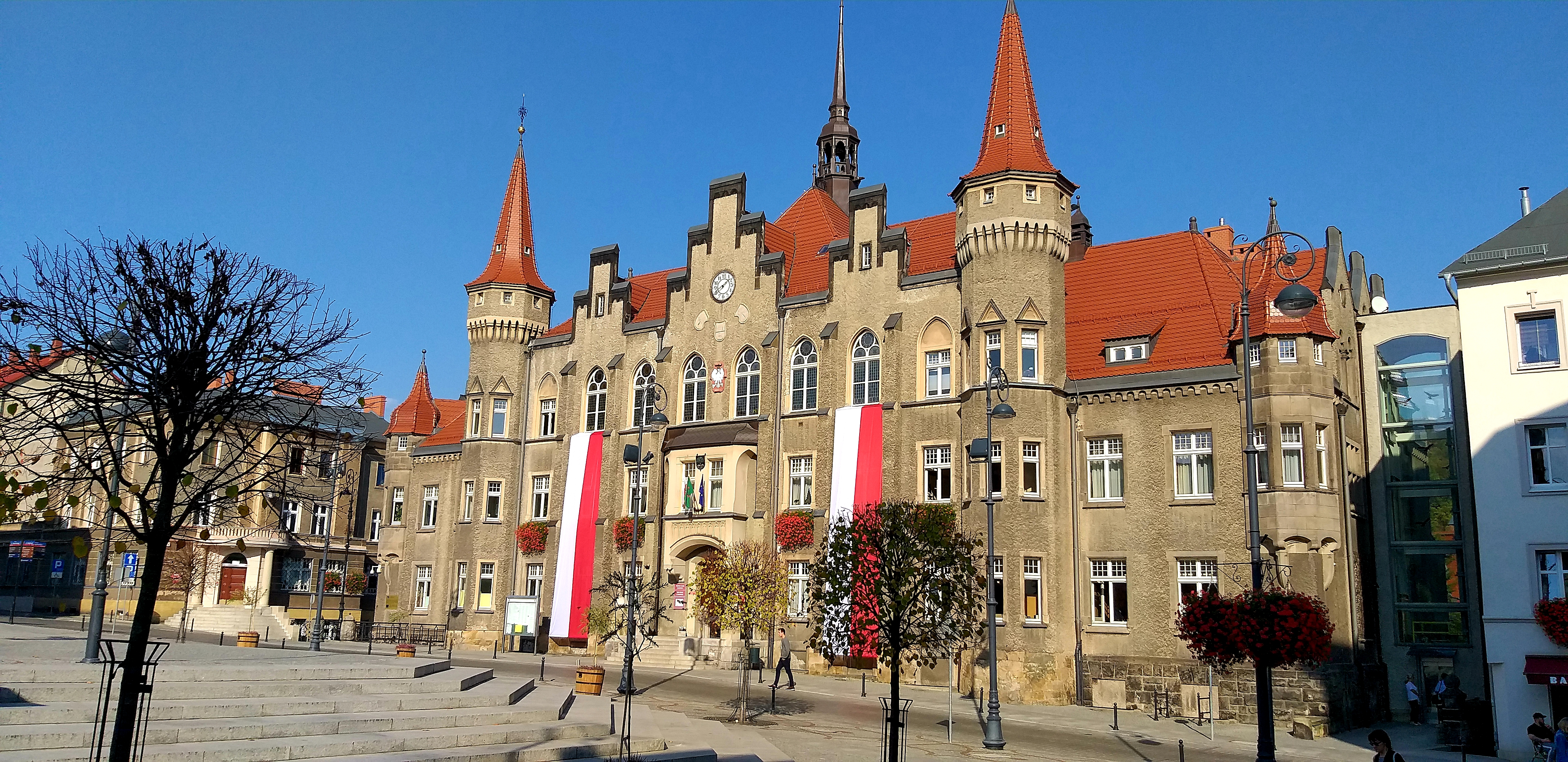
City hall (built 1879)

Including date of incorporation into the city

- Nowe Miasto (1880)
- Stary Zdrój (1905, 1919)
- Poniatów – formerly (U)Stronie (1929, 1973)
- Podgórze I (1931)
- Podgórze II – formerly Dzietrzychów (1934)
- Sobięcin – formerly Węglewo (1951)
- Szczawienko (1951)
- Rusinowa (1951)
- Piaskowa Góra (1951)
- Biały Kamień (1951)
- Konradów (1958)
- Kozice (1958)
- Glinik Stary (1973)
- Książ (1973)
- Lubiechów (1973)
- Glinik Nowy (1973)
- Podzamcze (1976)
- Osiedle Wanda

== Education ==
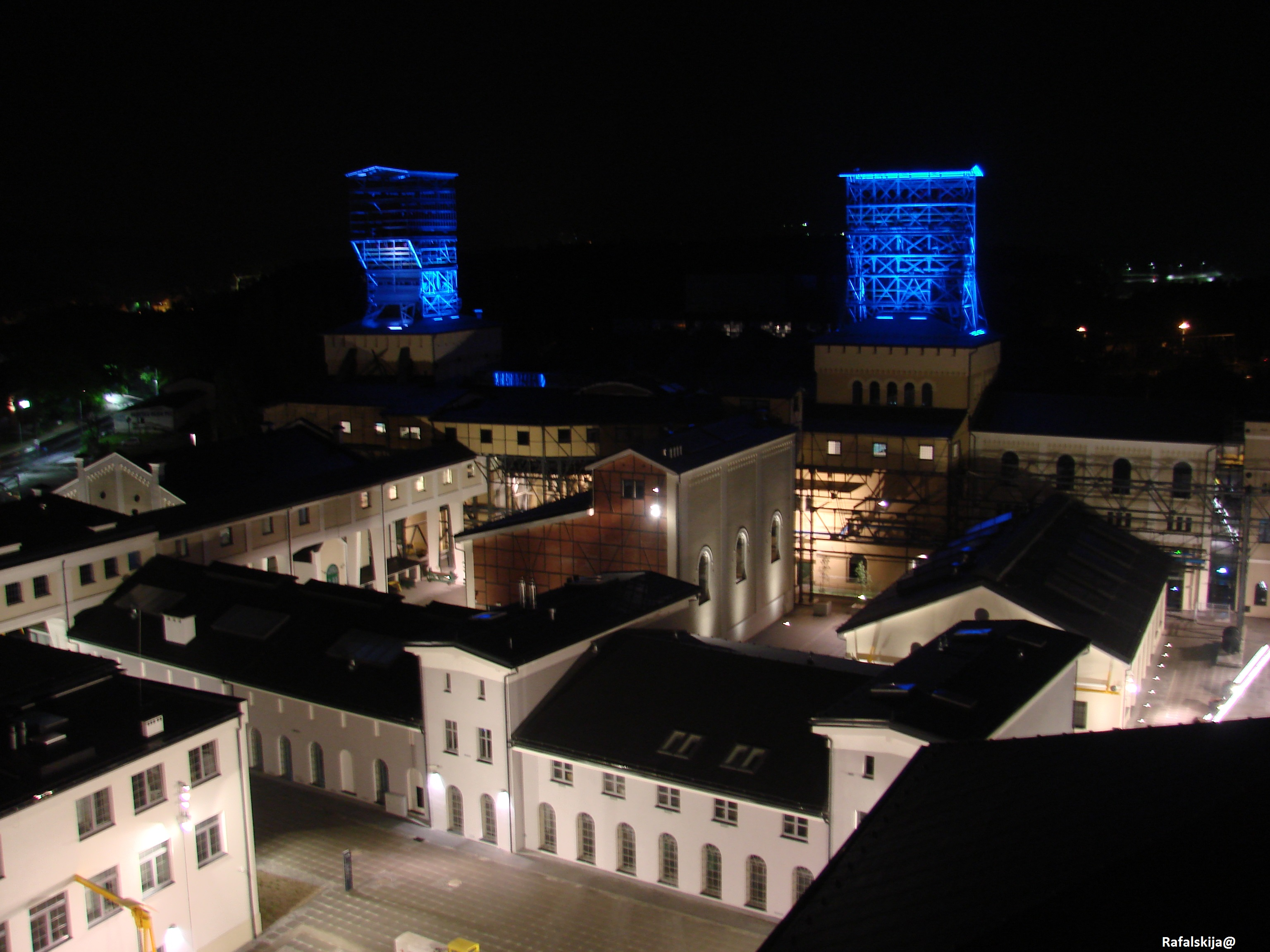
Stara Kopalnia Science and Culture Centre

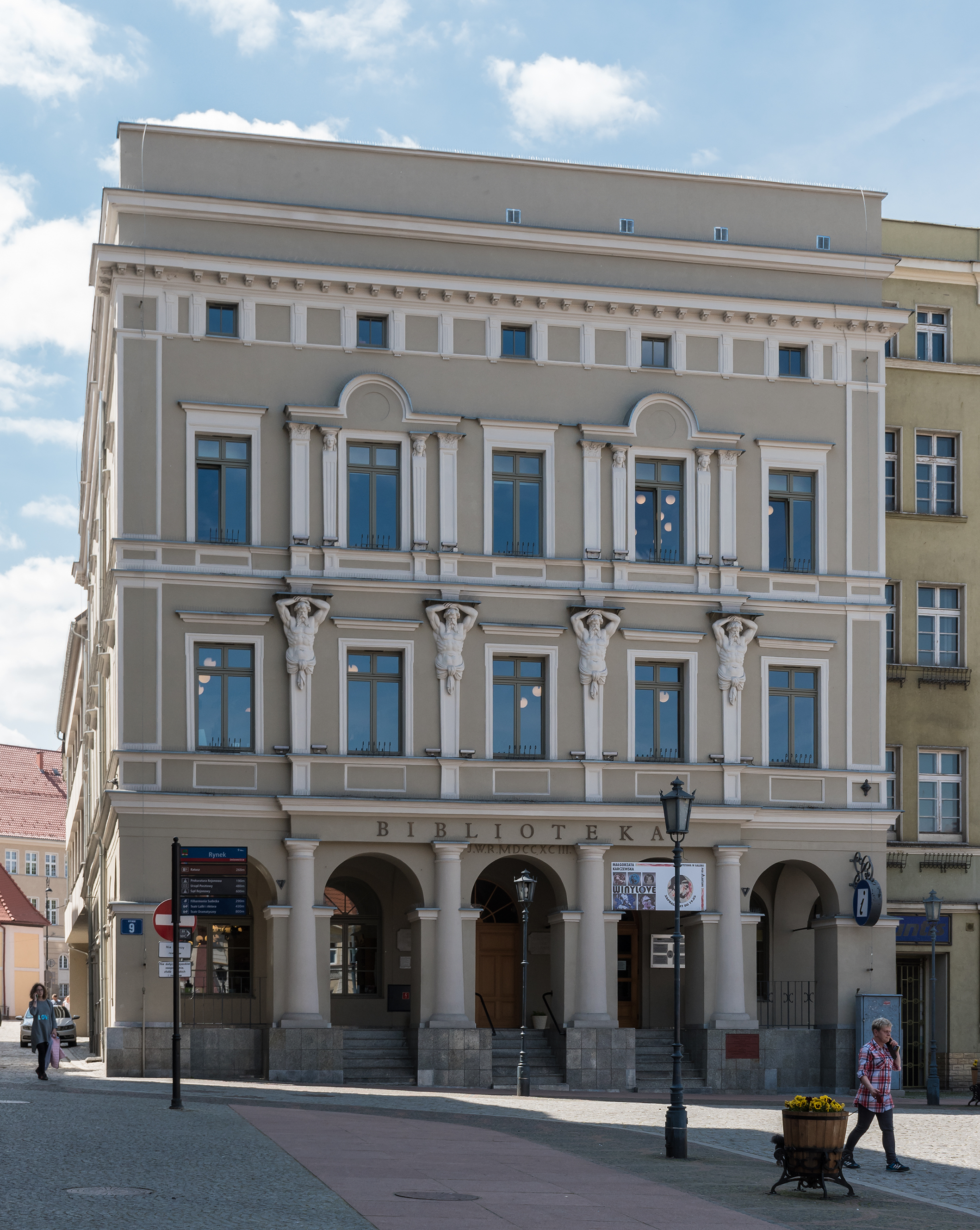
Biblioteka Pod Atlantami (public library)

- Angelus Silesius State University in Wałbrzych
- Wrocław Technical University in Wałbrzych
- Wałbrzyska Wyższa Szkoła Zarządzania i Przedsiębiorczości
- Ignacy Paderewski High School
- Hugo Kołłątaj High School
- Mikołaj Kopernik High School
- The city has a research center, Polish Academy of Sciences

== Politics ==
=== Wałbrzych constituency ===
Members of Parliament (Sejm) elected from Wałbrzych constituency:

- Zbigniew Chlebowski, PO
- Henryk Gołębiewski, SLD
- Roman Ludwiczuk, PO (Senat)
- Katarzyna Mrzygłocka, PO
- Giovanni Roman, PiS
- Mieczysław Szyszka, PiS (Senat)
- Anna Zalewska, PiS

== Sports ==
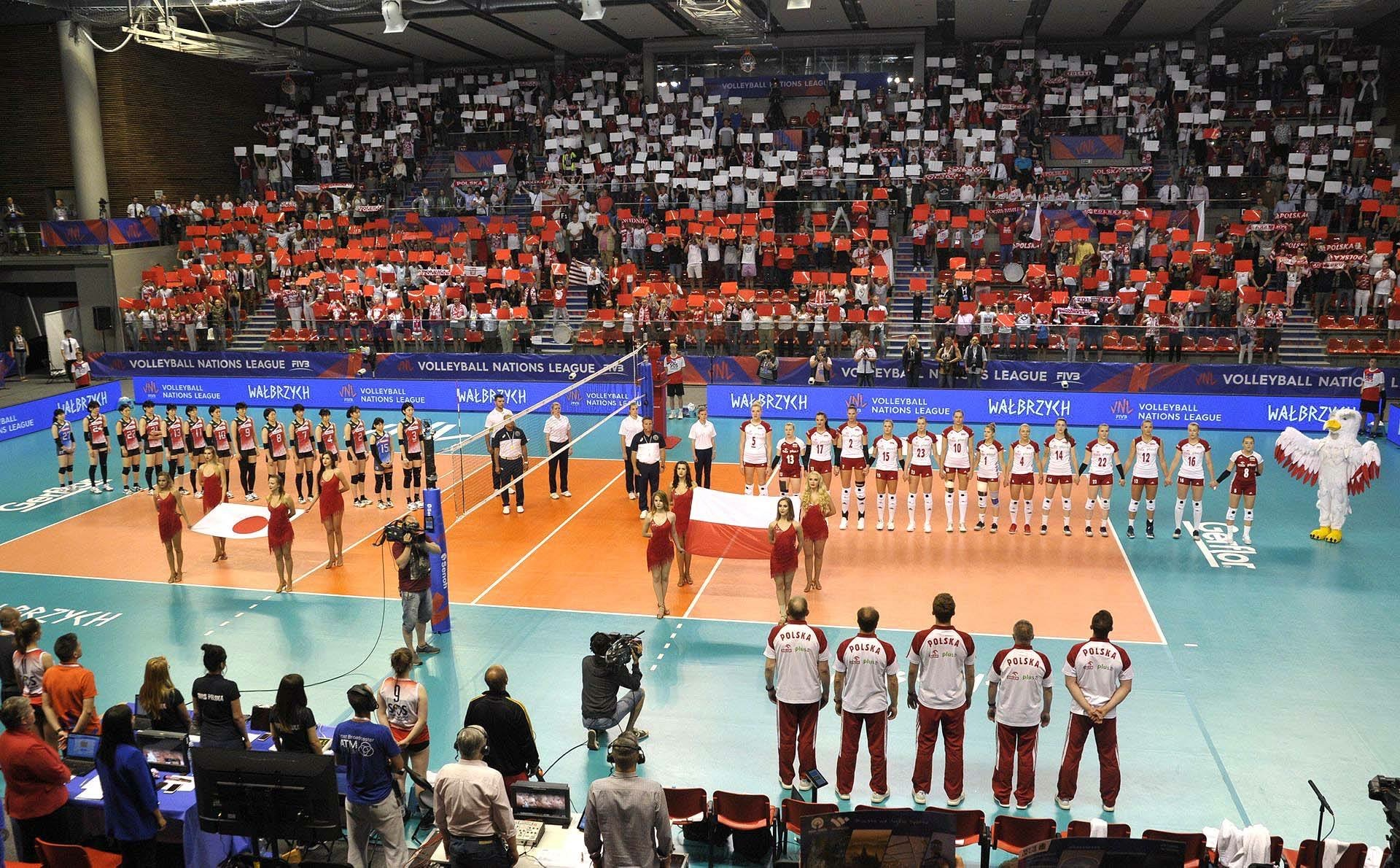
2018 FIVB Volleyball Women's Nations League match between Poland and Japan in Wałbrzych

- Górnik Wałbrzych is a professional men's basketball club, two times Polish champions. Currently, it plays in the Polish 3rd league. Last time Górnik played in the Polish Basketball League (the Polish top basketball league) was in 2009.
- Górnik Wałbrzych is a professional men's football club playing in the Polish 4th league (5th level). It played in the Ekstraklasa (top tier) in the 1980s.
- Zagłębie Wałbrzych is a male and female football club. Men's club section played in the Ekstraklasa in the 1960s and 1970s, finishing 3rd in 1971. Participated in the UEFA Cup competitions, reaching the 1/16 finals.
- KK Wałbrzych (formerly Górnik Nowe Miasto Wałbrzych) is a semi-professional men's basketball club playing in the Polish 3rd league.
- Chełmiec Wałbrzych is a professional men's and women's volleyball sports team.

There are many semi-professional or amateur football clubs (like Czarni Wałbrzych, Juventur Wałbrzych, Podgórze Wałbrzych, Gwarek Wałbrzych) and one basketball club (KS Dark Dog plays in the Polish 3rd league).

- LKKS Górnik Wałbrzych is a cycling club.
- Wałbrzych native Sebastian Janikowski is a placekicker in the NFL.
- ASZ PWSZ Walbrzych is a level 1 women's soccer team in Ekstraliga.

== Media ==
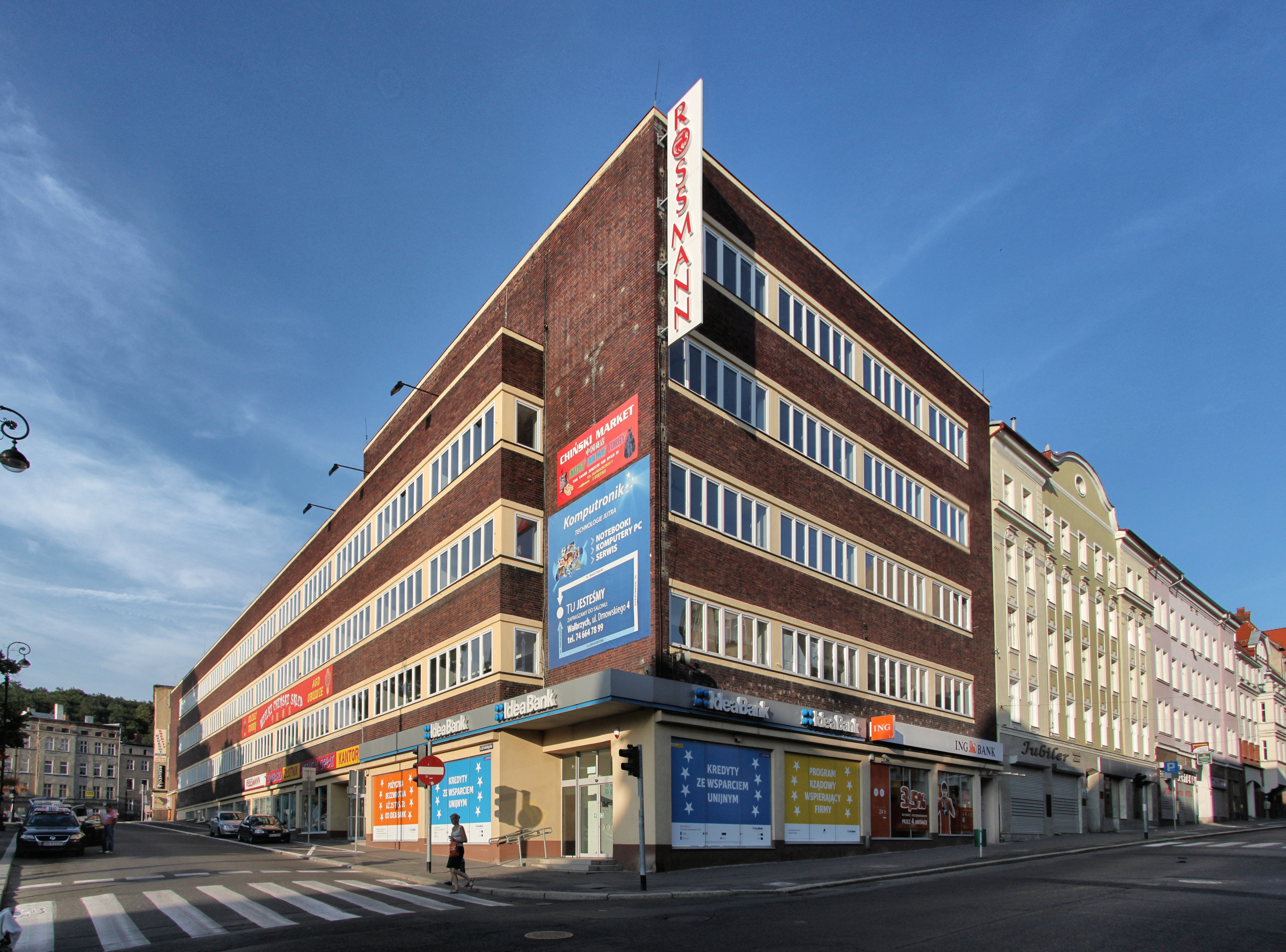
Słowackiego Street

- New Walbrzych Headlines
- Tygodnik Wałbrzyski
- www.walbrzych.info
- TV Zamkowa
- TV Walbrzych
- 30 minut – Gazeta która nie ma ceny (free newspaper)

== Notable people ==
Historical population
Year	Pop.	±%
1939	66,372	—
1950	93,842	+41.4%
1960	117,209	+24.9%
1970	125,200	+6.8%
1980	133,549	+6.7%
1990	141,011	+5.6%
2000	131,675	−6.6%
2010	120,197	−8.7%
2020	109,971	−8.5%

- Wolfgang Menzel (1798–1873), German poet, critic and literary historian
- Gerhard Menzel (1894–1966), German writer
- Abraham Robinson (1918–1974), German-Jewish-American mathematician
- Klaus Töpfer (1938–2024), German politician (CDU)
- Christian Brückner (born 1943), German actor
- Marcel Reif (born 1949), German soccer journalist
- Krzesimir Dębski (born 1953), composer and conductor
- Urszula Włodarczyk (born 1965), Polish heptathlete
- Joanna Bator (born 1968), Polish Nike Award-winning novelist, journalist, feminist and academic
- Maciej Szczepaniak (born 1973), Polish rally driver
- Piotr Giro (born 1974), Polish-Swedish dancer and choreographer
- Leszek Lichota (born 1977), Polish actor
- Krzysztof Ignaczak (born 1978), Polish volleyball player
- Sebastian Janikowski (born 1978), former American football placekicker
- Adrian Mrowiec (born 1983), Polish footballer
- Edyta Nawrocka (born 1986), Polish singer, songwriter, actress, dancer and TV presenter
- Bartosz Kurek (born 1988), Polish volleyball player and World Champion
- Sławomir Bohdziewicz (born 1990), Polish boxer

== Twin towns – sister cities ==
Wałbrzych is twinned with:

- Boryslav, Ukraine (2009)
- Cape Breton, Canada (2019)
- Dnipro, Ukraine (2001)
- Foggia, Italy (1998)
- Freiberg, Germany (1991)
- Gżira, Malta (2000)
- Hradec Králové, Czech Republic (1991)
- Jastarnia, Poland (1997)
- Vannes, France (2001)
