= Wałbrzych Główny railway station =

Main railway station of Wałbrzych, Poland

Wałbrzych Główny
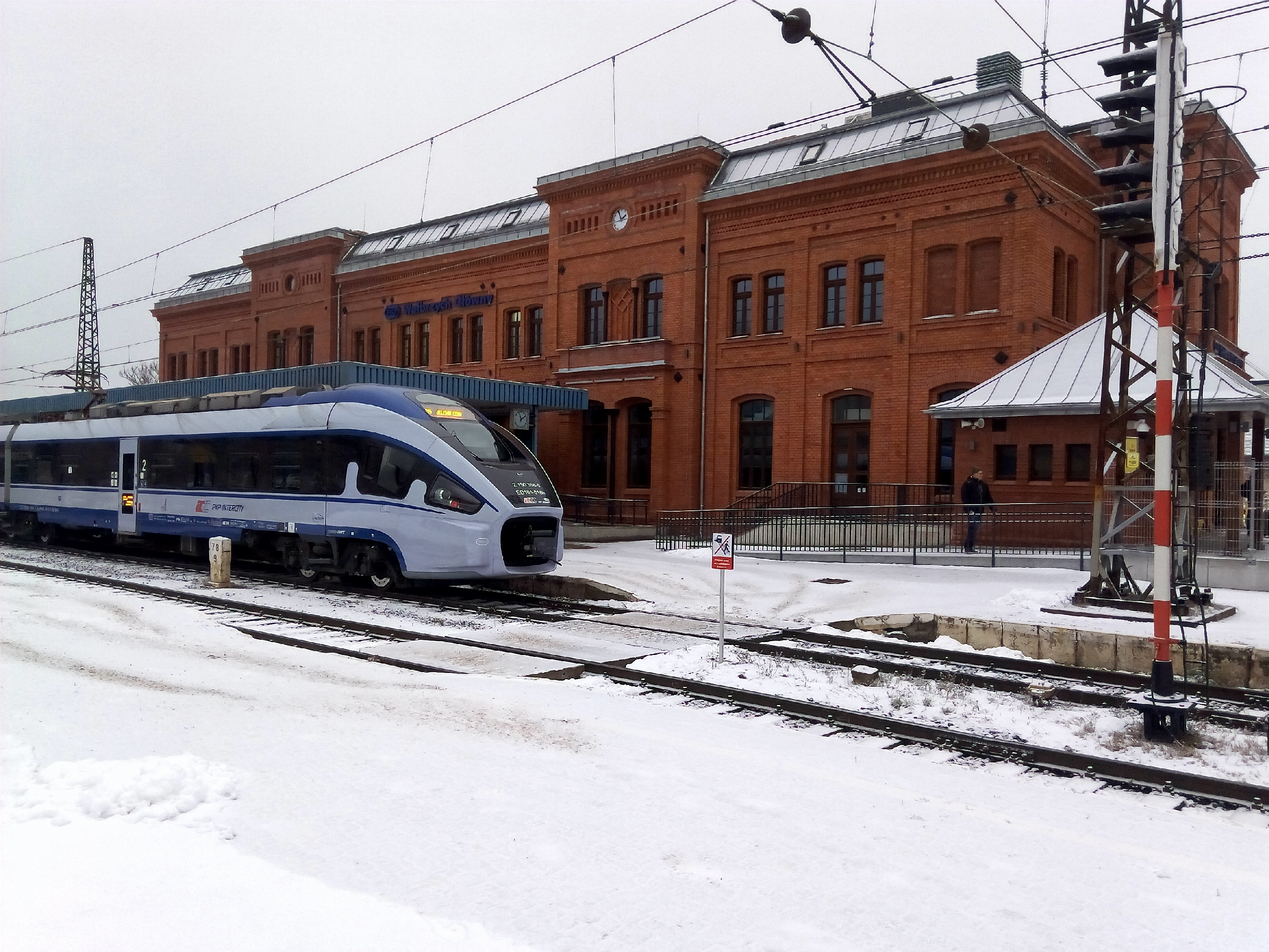
- A PKP Intercity Pesa Dart at the station bound for Jelenia Góra in 2021

General information
- Location: Wałbrzych, Lower Silesian Voivodeship; Poland
- Coordinates: 50°44′36.3″N 16°16′55.5″E
- Owner: Polish State Railways
- Lines: Wrocław Świebodzki–Zgorzelec railway; Kłodzko–Wałbrzych railway
- Platforms: 6

History
- Opened: 15 August 1867
- Former names: Dittersbach (1867–1934); Waldenburg-Dittersbach (1934–1945); Borowieck Dzietrzychów (1945–1946); Wałbrzych Podgórze (1946–1947); Wałbrzych Ogorzelec (1947–1948)

Services
Preceding station	KD	Following station
Wałbrzych Fabryczny towards Wrocław Główny	D6	Jedlina-Zdrój towards Jelenia Góra
Wałbrzych Fabryczny towards Wrocław Główny	D60	Boguszów-Gorce Wschód towards Szklarska Poręba Górna
Wałbrzych Fabryczny towards Wałbrzych Miasto	D96	Boguszów-Gorce Wschód towards Kudowa-Zdrój
Location
- Location within Poland Location within Lower Silesian Voivodeship

Wałbrzych Główny (lit. 'Wałbrzych Main'; German: Waldenburg-Dittersbach) is the main railway station of the city of Wałbrzych, in the Lower Silesian Voivodeship in south-western Poland.

Wałbrzych Główny is the largest mountain railway station in Poland, located at an altitude of approximately 500 m (1,600 ft) above sea level.

== History ==
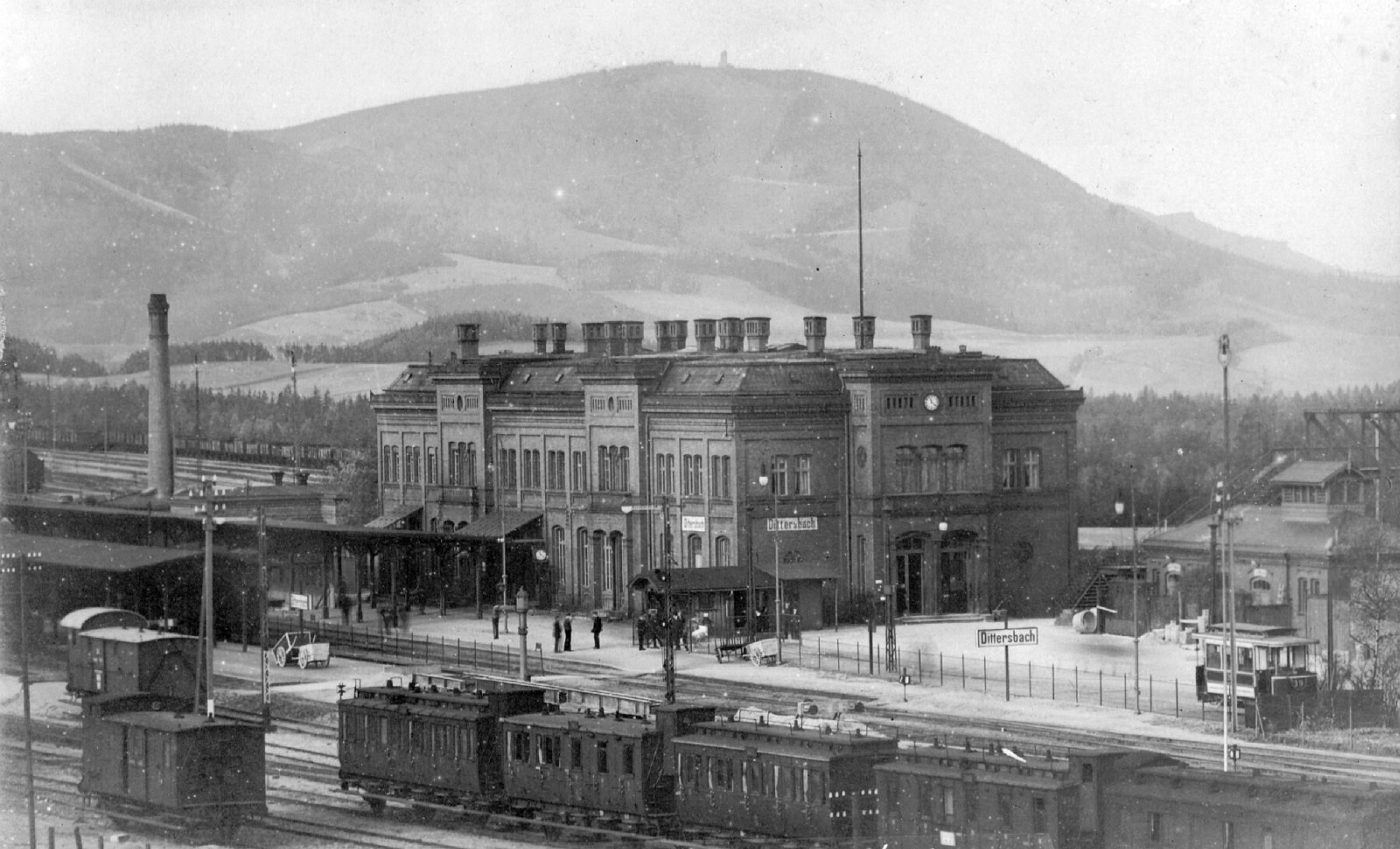
Station in the early 20th century

The station was opened by Prussian State Railways as Dittersbach on 15 August 1867, part of the historical Silesian Mountain Railway. Before 1900, the station building was rebuilt and expanded. In 1934, the station was renamed to Waldenburg-Dittersbach.

The original station consisted of a locomotive depot (roundhouse), which later stabled electric trains. The roundhouse closed in 2013. The station also included many sidings which were used to shunt and stable trains, (three sidings are still operational) some sidings branched off to local mines, like the Melchior Mine, as at the time Wałbrzych Główny was also a major loading bay for freight trains, which housed several warehouses, and the Eugeniusz mine shaft, which was built in 1889, and demolished in 2001 after being abandoned in 1993, due to its poor condition. A railway guardhouse and workshop were also once based at the station.

After World War II, the area came under Polish administration. As a result, the station was taken over by Polish State Railways. The station was renamed to Borowieck Dzietrzychów, then to Wałbrzych Podgórze in 1946, later to Wałbrzych Ogorzelec in 1947, and finally to its modern name, Wałbrzych Główny, in 1948. The station was briefly officially called Wałbrzych Dworzec Główny between 1949–1953.

In 1949, the tram station interchange was retired and replaced with a trolleybus service. Wałbrzych Główny was re-electrified on 18 December 1965, until the route to Wrocław. The trolleybus service was retired by the 1970s.

In 2019, Polish State Railways (PKP) announced the modernisation of the station, which included the renovation of the station building, and the construction of new facilities at the station. PKP opened the newly modernised station on 27 May 2021, at a total construction cost of approximately 33.5 million Polish złoty.

== Train services ==
The station is served by the following services:

- Regional services (KD) Wrocław - Wałbrzych - Jelenia Góra
- Regional services (KD) Wrocław - Wałbrzych - Jelenia Góra - Szklarska Poręba Górna
- Regional services (KD) Wałbrzych - Kłodzko - Kudowa-Zdrój
- Regional services (PR) Szklarska Poręba Górna - Jelenia Góra - Wrocław Główny - Poznań Główny
