= Wałbrzych Fabryczny railway station =

Railway station in Wałbrzych, Poland

Wałbrzych Fabryczny
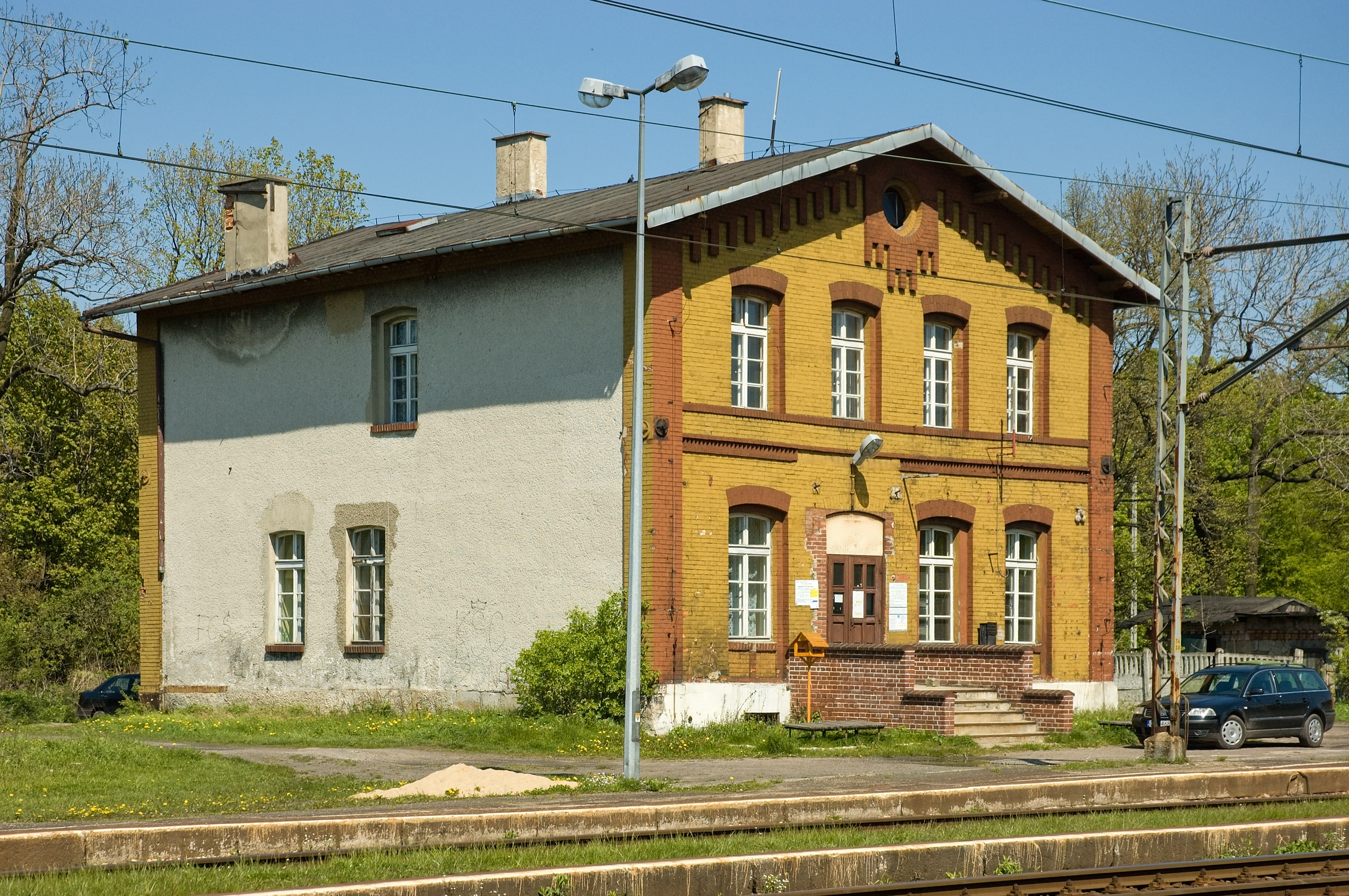
- Station building

General information
- Location: Wałbrzych, Lower Silesian Voivodeship; Poland
- Coordinates: 50°45′40.1″N 16°16′04.0″E
- Owner: Polish State Railways
- Line: Wrocław Świebodzki–Zgorzelec railway
- Platforms: 2

History
- Opened: 15 August 1867
- Former names: Waldenburg (Oberer Bahnhof) (1867–1909); Waldenburg (Schlesien) (1909–1945); Borowieck (1945–1946); Wałbrzych (1946–1947)

Services
Preceding station	KD	Following station
Wałbrzych Centrum towards Wałbrzych Miasto	D96	Wałbrzych Główny towards Kudowa-Zdrój
Wałbrzych Centrum towards Wrocław Główny	D6	Wałbrzych Główny towards Jelenia Góra
Wałbrzych Centrum towards Wrocław Główny	D60	Wałbrzych Główny towards Szklarska Poręba Górna
Location
- Location within Poland Location within Lower Silesian Voivodeship

Wałbrzych Fabryczny lit. 'Wałbrzych Industrial' is a railway station in the city of Wałbrzych, in the Lower Silesian Voivodeship in south-western Poland.

== History ==
The station was opened by Prussian State Railways as Waldenburg on 15 August 1867, originally part of the historical Silesian Mountain Railway, serving at the time as the main station of Wałbrzych. It is a major hub for freight trains heading to local mines, including the Victoria (at the time Gluckhilf) mine, were a railway line ran from the station to the mine, which opened 14 years earlier in 1853.

After World War II, the area came under Polish administration. As a result, the station was taken over by Polish State Railways. It was renamed to Borowieck (later Wałbrzych) and eventually to its modern name, Wałbrzych Fabryczny, in 1947. Wałbrzych Fabryczny continues to serve as a major freight hub in the area, serving local mines.

== Train services ==
The station is served by the following services:

- Regional services (KD) Wrocław - Wałbrzych - Jelenia Góra
- Regional services (KD) Wrocław - Wałbrzych - Jelenia Góra - Szklarska Poręba Górna
- Regional services (KD) Wałbrzych - Kłodzko - Kudowa-Zdrój
