= Wałbrzych Centrum railway station =

Railway station in Wałbrzych, Poland

Wałbrzych Centrum
- Station in May 2023

General information
- Location: Wałbrzych, Lower Silesian Voivodeship; Poland
- Coordinates: 50°46′24.1″N 16°16′11.5″E
- Owner: Polish State Railways
- Line: Wrocław Świebodzki–Zgorzelec railway
- Platforms: 2

History
- Opened: 13 December 2020

Services
Preceding station	KD	Following station
Wałbrzych Miasto Terminus	D96	Wałbrzych Fabryczny towards Kudowa-Zdrój
Wałbrzych Miasto towards Wrocław Główny	D6	Wałbrzych Fabryczny towards Jelenia Góra
Wałbrzych Miasto towards Wrocław Główny	D60	Wałbrzych Fabryczny towards Szklarska Poręba Górna
Location
- Location within Poland Location within Lower Silesian Voivodeship

Wałbrzych Centrum (lit. 'Wałbrzych City Centre') is a railway station in the city of Wałbrzych, in the Lower Silesian Voivodeship in south-western Poland.

== History ==
On 29 September 2017, Polish State Railways (PKP) signed a contract with the Infrakol and TrackTec Construction Consortium for the construction of a railway station named Wałbrzych Śródmieście. Construction began in 2018, with the station being renamed to Wałbrzych Centrum. The station opened on 13 December 2020.

== Train services ==
The station is served by the following services:

- Regional services (KD) Wrocław - Wałbrzych - Jelenia Góra
- Regional services (KD) Wrocław - Wałbrzych - Jelenia Góra - Szklarska Poręba Górna
- Regional services (KD) Wałbrzych - Kłodzko - Kudowa-Zdrój
