= Wałbrzych Miasto railway station =

Railway station in Stary Zdrój, Wałbrzych, Poland

Wałbrzych Miasto
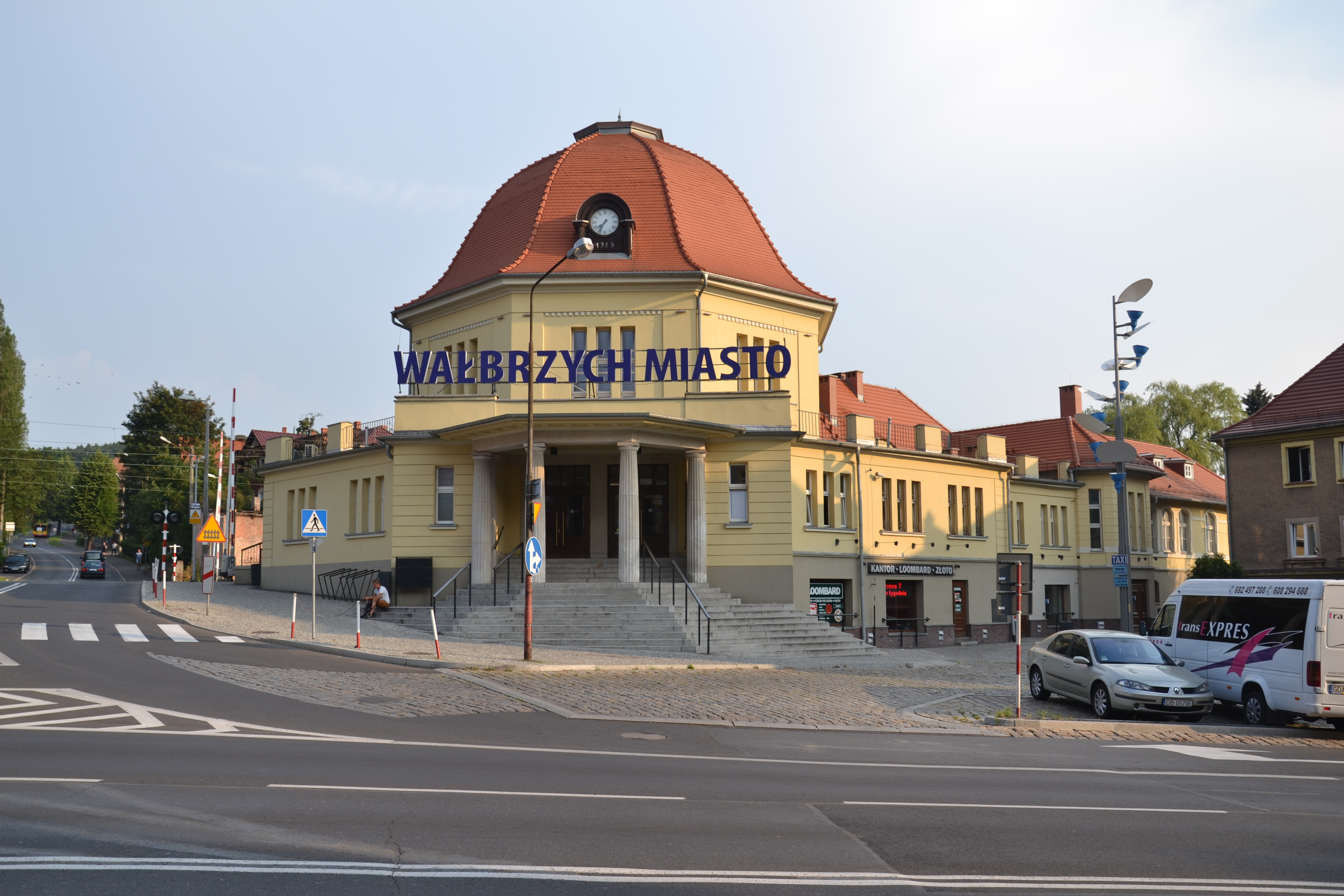
- Station building

General information
- Location: Stary Zdrój, Wałbrzych, Lower Silesian Voivodeship; Poland
- Coordinates: 50°47′07.0″N 16°17′03.1″E
- Owner: Polish State Railways
- Line: Wrocław Świebodzki–Zgorzelec railway
- Platforms: 3

History
- Opened: 1 March 1853
- Former names: Altwasser (1853–1922); Waldenburg Altwasser (1922–1945); Borowieck Starzyny (1945–1946); Wałbrzych Starzyny (1946–1947); Wałbrzych Stary Zdrój (1947–1948); Wałbrzych Miasto Stary Zdrój (1948–1949)

Services
Preceding station	KD	Following station
Terminus	D96	Wałbrzych Centrum towards Kudowa-Zdrój
Wałbrzych Szczawienko towards Wrocław Główny	D6	Wałbrzych Centrum towards Jelenia Góra
Wałbrzych Szczawienko towards Wrocław Główny	D60	Wałbrzych Centrum towards Szklarska Poręba Górna
Location
- Location within Poland Location within Lower Silesian Voivodeship

Wałbrzych Miasto lit. 'Wałbrzych City' is a railway station in the Stary Zdrój district of Wałbrzych, in the Lower Silesian Voivodeship in south-western Poland.

== History ==
The station was opened by Prussian State Railways as Altwasser on 1 March 1853. In 1916, the station was electrified and was significantly expanded to include a freight depot in the northern section. In 1922, it was renamed to Waldenburg Altwasser for designation, Waldenburg being the German name of Wałbrzych.

After World War II, the area came under Polish administration. As a result, the station was taken over by Polish State Railways. The station was renamed five more times; Borowieck Starzyny in 1945, Wałbrzych Starzyny in 1946, Wałbrzych Stary Zdrój in 1947, Wałbrych Miasto Stary Zdrój in 1948, and finally to its modern name, Wałbrzych Miasto in 1949.

In 2010, the station was modernised which included the renovation of the station building, at a total cost of approximately 10 million Polish złoty. In 2018, the overhead wires were rebuilt, with signalling also being upgraded.

== Train services ==
The station is served by the following services:

- Regional services (KD) Wrocław - Wałbrzych - Jelenia Góra
- Regional services (KD) Wrocław - Wałbrzych - Jelenia Góra - Szklarska Poręba Górna
- Regional services (KD) Wałbrzych - Kłodzko - Kudowa-Zdrój
