= Bernhard Studer (painter) =

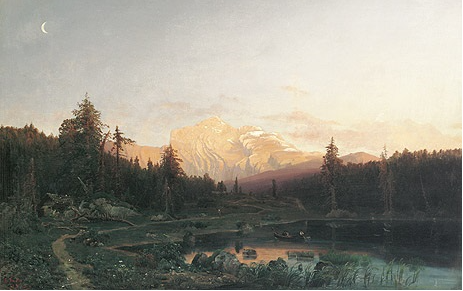
Evening Landscape on the Hintersee with a View of the Hoher Göll

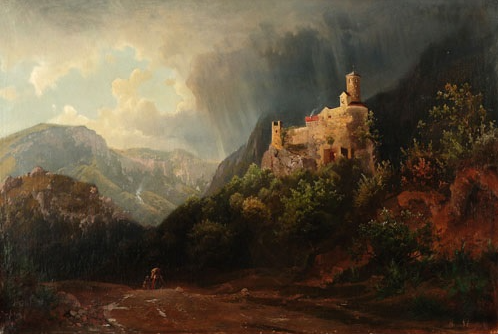
View of Alt-Bechburg Castle

Bernhard Studer (5 August 1832, Gunzgen - 22 April 1868, Munich) was a Swiss landscape painter.

== Biography ==
His father, Leonz, was a house painter. At the age of fourteen, he began to study drawing with a sculptor named Johann Georg Lüthy in Olten. After that, he returned to Solothurn and attended the drawing classes of Gaudenz Taverna. In 1850, following the advice of his teachers, he enrolled as a student at the Academy of Fine Arts, Munich. He also found work in the studios of the landscape painter, Carl Millner. After two years, financially difficulties compelled him to return home.

In 1853, with a student loan from the Canton of Solothurn, he was able to enroll at the Kunstakademie Düsseldorf, where he was first exposed to the Düsseldorf School of painting. He studied with Rudolf Wiegmann, Johann Wilhelm Schirmer and Hans Gude, all noted landscape painters. While there, he became a member of Malkasten, an artists' association. He remained at the Akademie until 1856, when he was dismissed for having an "unordentlichen Lebens" (disorderly, or unorthodox, life).

That same year, he went with his teacher, Schirmer, to the Academy of Fine Arts, Karlsruhe. During these times, he continued to exhibit in Switzerland and received a silver medal in Bern in 1857. He returned to Munich in 1865 and died there three years later, from what was officially ruled a "progressive lung disease".

He is mentioned in a biographical novel, "Hans Marbot", written by Erwin Friedrich Baumann. This book traces the life of Baumann's father Friedrich Baumann, a close friend of Studer's who was the subject of his only known portrait painting.

Many of his works are in private collections and an effort is underway to create a catalog raisonné.
