= Friedrich Ludwig Heinrich Waagen =

German painter

Friedrich Ludwig Heinrich Waagen (1750 in Göttingen – 1822 in Dresden?) also Christian Friedrich Ludwig Heinrich Waagen, Wagen or Wage) was a German portrait, history and landscape painter born in the Holy Roman Empire. Hardly anything is known about his works. However, he had acquired extensive knowledge of art, amassed a collection of paintings in Hamburg and was known to friends with or in-laws of many important personalities of his time. Gustav Friedrich Waagen (1794-1868) and Carl Waagen (1800-1873) are his sons.

== Life ==
=== Göttingen ===
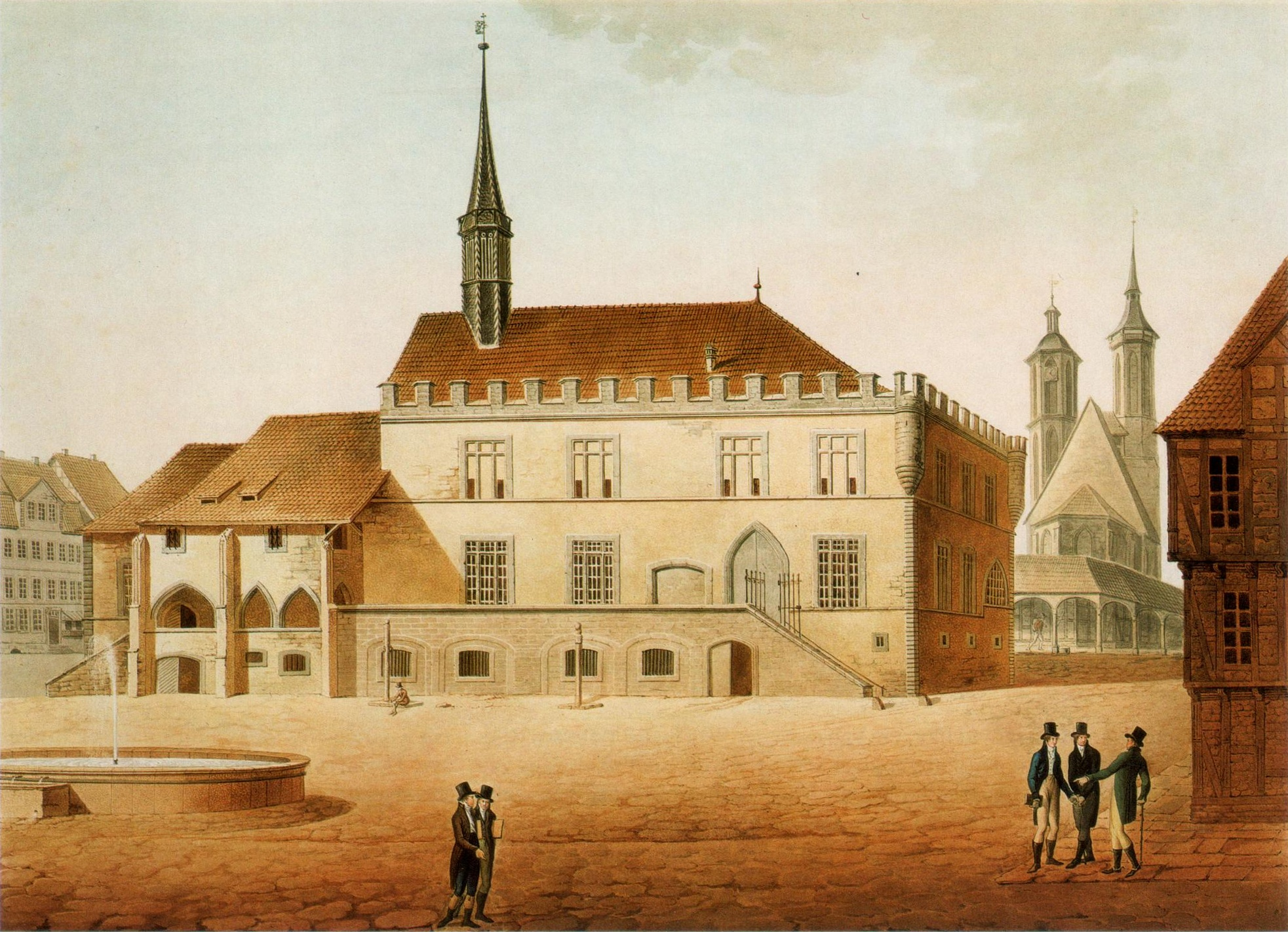
Göttingen, Altes Rathaus (ca. 1800). Water colour by Johann Christian Eberlein

Waagen came, according to Johann Heinrich Tischbein (1722-1789) from Göttingen. From 1767, Waagen studied mathematics in Göttingen. He was matriculated there on 5 May 1767.

On 18 June 1770, his "Entwurf zur Göttingischen Universitäts Bibliothek", laid out and drawn by him, was published. Also preserved is a family album by Johann Thomas Ludwig Wehrs (1751-1811), in which Waagen registered himself on 17 October 1770 and also left a pen and ink drawing "Allegory of Science" in it. Waagen also had private lessons in 1770 in the studio of Johann Heinrich Tischbein the Elder, training in portrait and history painting. He is also said to have been a pupil of Ferdinand Kobell (1740-1799), choosing landscape painting as his subject and taking Nicolas Poussin (1594-1664) as a model. He is also said to have been a gifted figure painter.

In 1778, the first edition of the "Naturgeschichte für Kinder" by Georg Christian Raff (1748-1788) was published. For this work, Waagen initially drew eleven, and later a total of fourteen, illustrated plates on plants, animals and minerals, which were engraved by the Nuremberg engraver Johann Georg Sturm (1742-1793).

=== Kassel, trip to Italy and stay in Rome ===
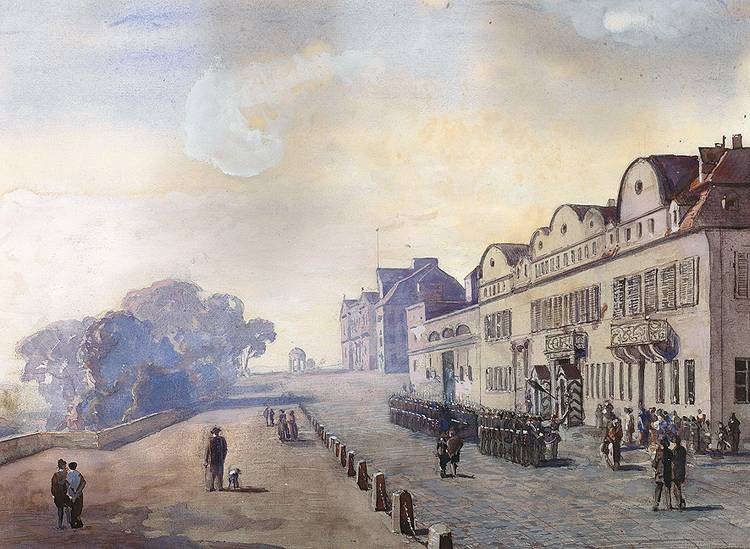
First Kassel Art Academy in Bellevue Palace. Gouache by Louis Kolitz

From 1778 to 1779, Waagen studied at the Kunsthochschule Kassel, founded in 1777, where Johann Heinrich Tischbein the Elder was also a professor of Drawing and Painting. Subsequently, from 1779 to 1781, he travelled together with his friend Johann Heinrich Tischbein the Younger (1751-1829) to Italy via Nuremberg. Tischbein had received a scholarship from the Kassel Academy of Art for this trip and wrote about it: "My travelling companion was Mr Waagen from Göttingen, who had studied architecture and painting in Kassel, but now wanted to devote himself entirely to painting in Rome. [...] My friend Waagen copied 'The Sacrifice of Noah after the Flood' by Poussin in the Corsina Gallery. The work was intended for his benefactor and therefore gave him double pleasure.")

Around 1780, Waagen was in Rome to further his studies. There he also became friends with the painter Maler Müller (1780-1825). Müller's manuscript of Golo and Genovefa was subsequently brought back to Germany by Waagen.

=== Another stay in Göttingen ===
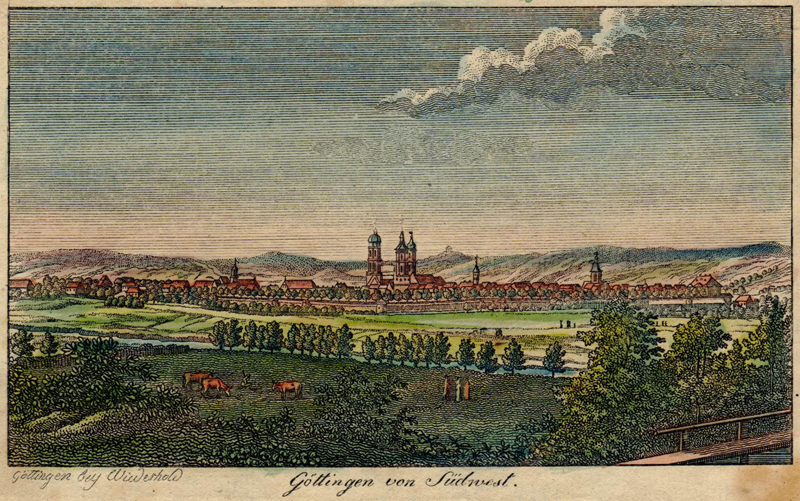
Göttingen (ca. 1810). Colored engraving

After Waagen returned from Italy, he stayed in Göttingen again around 1785 and was on friendly terms with the physician Johann Heinrich Jäger (1752-1825), with the mathematician Henrich Julius Oppermann (1752-1811) and with his brother Heinrich Oppermann († 1804). The charcoal drawing showing Gottfried August Bürger at a reading and Waagen's oil painting depicting the Oppermann brothers, the physician Johann Heinrich Jäger and the painter himself were also created during this period.

=== Hamburg years ===
In 1793, he married Johanna Louise Alberti (1765-1806), a native of Hamburg, a daughter of the Hamburg pastor Julius Gustav Alberti (1723-1772) and his wife, Dorothea Charlotte Alberti (1733-1809). Their circle of friends and supporters included, among others, Friedrich Gottlieb Klopstock (1724-1803) as well as the young Johann Heinrich Voß (1751-1826). In Hamburg, Waagen lived as a painter together with his wife in the house Große Bleichen No. 375. The friendly relationship with Johann Heinrich Voß then also existed with Waagen and is still documented for the year 1818.

In 1794, Waagen's son Gustav Friedrich was born, in 1800 his second son Carl was born.

In 1797, Waagen met Ludwig Tieck (1773-1853) when the latter was in Hamburg. Waagen gave him Müller's manuscript of Golo und Genovefa on this occasion. In 1798, Tieck married Amalie Alberti (1769–1837), a sister of Waagen's wife Johanna Louise, and thus became Waagen's brother-in-law.

At that time, Hamburg did not yet have an art academy or a gallery. However, French emigrants brought many art treasures with them to Hamburg during the French Revolution. Waagen's extensive knowledge of art and his negotiating skills enabled him, with little financial means, to assemble an extensive private collection of paintings by Italian, Dutch and German painters, 'which he showed to the public on certain days for an entrance fee.

In 1800 and 1802, he participated in the prize competition for fine artists in Weimar. Waagen sent to Johann Wolfgang von Goethe (1749-1832) two paintings for the "Prize Task for the Year 1800" and explained in his accompanying letter of 6 August 1800 that he had only ever been able to devote himself to his painting to a limited extent. In this place, "man für Gegenstände höherer Kunst gar keinen Sinn'."

Hamburg was largely Protestant and there was also no court of princes as in other German cities. The Protestant church had no interest in commissioning altarpieces, and there was also a lack of courtly patrons for representative history paintings.

Waagen sent six of his paintings for the 1802 Weimar Art Exhibition, hoping to sell them.

In the winter of 1804 Waagen announced the founding of an academy of drawing and painting and moved to ABCStraße No. 165 later that year. From 1805, his drawing and painting academy was also listed in the Hamburg address book. Thus he made a living as a teacher of drawing and painting and was able to secure the livelihood of his family.

Henrich Steffens (1773-1845), who was married to Johanna Reichardt (1784-after 1848), a niece of Waagen, described his encounters with Waagen around 1804 in Hamburg as follows: "He lived from teaching drawing and painting, and although his institute was important enough, he was only able to support himself and his family with difficulty. I had already made his acquaintance at Tieck's in Dresden, and the quiet, modest, truly pious man had attracted me deeply. His conversation was very instructive. He had spent a long time in Italy; his eye for art was sharpened and his knowledge of art was rewarded. [...] in any case, one had to be surprised to find such a collection in the possession of a man who had to support a family with toil and effort.

At that time, his collection of paintings already comprised "54 of the choicest masters' pieces of all schools", as Philipp Otto Runge (1777-1810) mentioned in one of his letters in December 1804. It should serve as inspiration for his students.

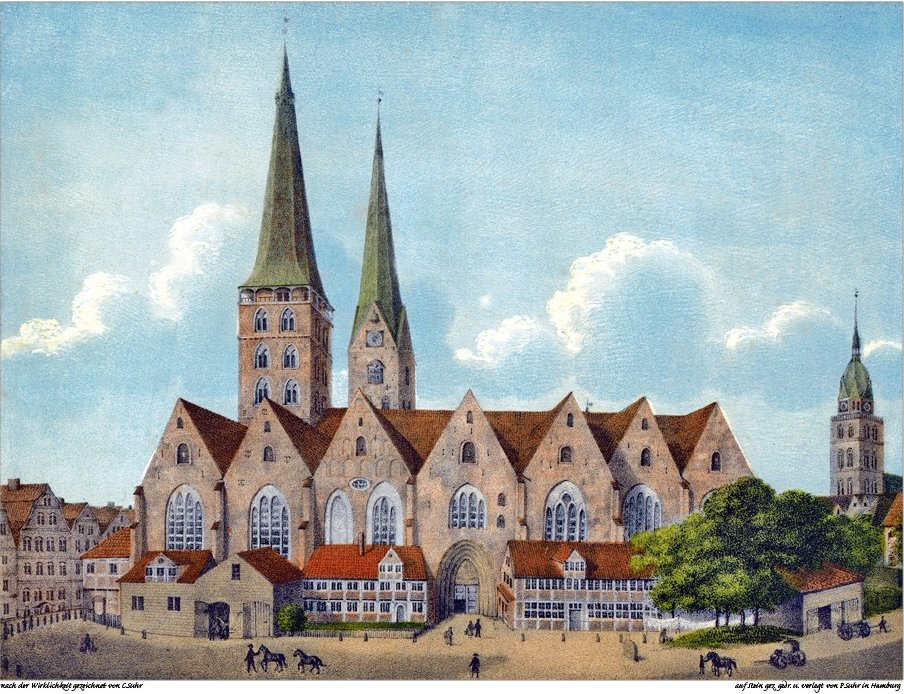
Hamburg Cathedral (c. 1800). Lithograph by Peter Suhr

In July 1804, the medieval St. Mary's Cathedral, Hamburg was approved for demolition. In October 1804, Waagen approached the city of Hamburg with a request to provide him with works from the cathedral slated for demolition for his art education purposes. He was given about two dozen medieval works, including four large panels from the main altar. As Waagen fell ill at the time of the pending salvage of the paintings, Philipp Otto Runge and Friedrich August von Klinkowström (1778-1835), who was staying with him at the time anyway the paintings for Waagen's private collection. The works were initially only lent to Waagen for his drawing school, but were then donated, "since not much could be expected from a public sale"'.In 1805, a contemporary report on this appeared in the journal Hamburg und Altona under the title Etwas über Herr Waagen's Gemäldeausstellung und Zeichenschule in Hamburg.

A pupil of this school of drawing and painting was also Johann Joachim Faber (1778-1846), before he left for a study trip in Europe.

=== Move to Altwasser (Silesia) and stay in Dresden ===
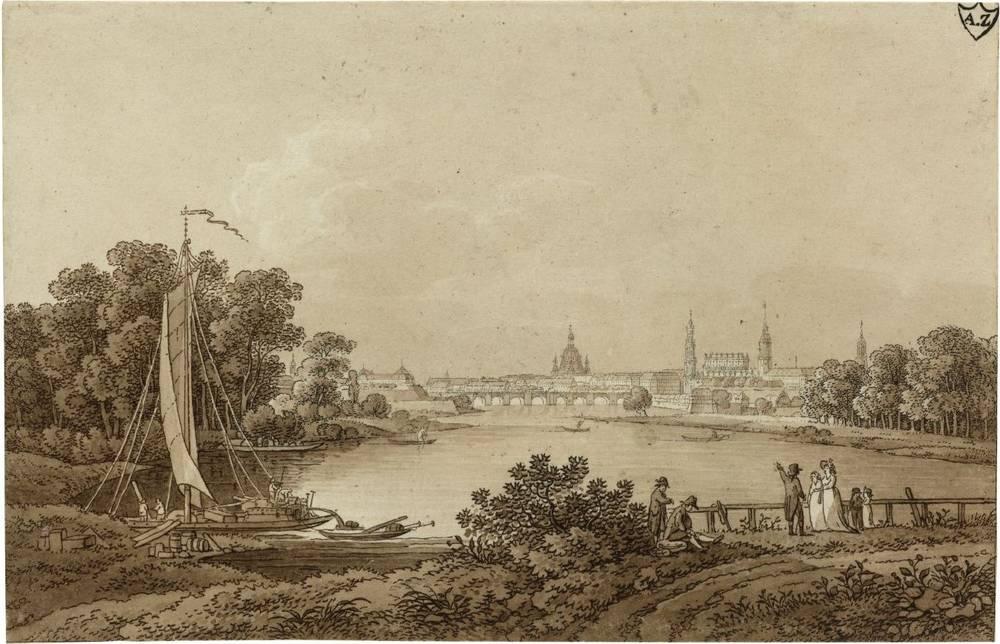
Dresden from the Pieschener Winkel (around 1800). Engraving by Adrian Zingg

Shortly after the death of his wife Johanna Louise, in the summer of 1807 Waagen offered her still unmarried sister Maria Alberti (1767-1812) to marry her. The marriage did not take place, as Maria Alberti demanded Waagen's conversion to Catholicism. In the same year, Waagen moved with his two sons to Silesia and lived there in Altwasser (Stary Zdrój). He took his extensive collection of paintings, including those from the cathedral, with him. There seemed to be no interest in Hamburg in keeping these works of art in the place. Nothing is known about the further whereabouts of most of the paintings from Waagen's collection. Lediglich vier große Tafeln, Seitenflügel des Hauptaltars, befinden sich heute im Warschauer Nationalmuseum.

From 1809, Waagen settled in Dresden and is said to have been active there as late as 1820. It is also known that he painted a portrait of his then 18-year-old son Gustav Friedrich in 1812. In August 1822, Waagen fell seriously ill. It is generally assumed that Waagen died in Dresden in 1822. However, in the autograph collection of the Göttingen State and University Library there are five letters written by Waagen on 31 December 1814, 3 March 1818 and 28 March 1818 in Waldenburg ("Waagen"). March 1818 in Waldenburg (Wałbrzych) and on 3 August 1822 as well as on 20 December 1822 in Neuweissstein (Biały Kamień, Wałbrzych).

== Work ==
=== Publications ===
- Friedrich Ludwig Heinrich Waagen: Entwurf zur Göttingischen Universitäts Bibliothek als solche nach Massgabe des dazu in der Kaspühle in Vorschlag gekommenen Raumes von dem Hrn. Oberbau Commissario Müller angegeben worden. Angelegt u. gezeichnet von Frd. Lud. Hr. Waagen, Göttingen 1770.
- Georg Christian Raff: Naturgeschichte für Kinder. With eleven copper plates by Friedrich Ludwig Heinrich Waagen, engraved by Johann Georg Sturm. Dieterich, Göttingen 1778. (Digitalisat)
Some panels from Raff drawn by Waagen: Naturgeschichte für Kinder, Göttingen 1778

Tafel VIII

Tafel IX

Tafel X

Tafel XI

=== Single paintings ===
- Allegorie der Wissenschaft. (Stadtarchiv Göttingen, Inv.-Nr. Stabu 17, Bl. 69v/70r), 1770, Pen and ink drawing (online)
- Selbstbildnis beim Zeichnen (Hamburger Kunsthalle, Kupferstichkabinett, Inv.-Nr. 1926–13) before 1780, 324 mm × 245 mm, black chalk (online)
- Das Opfer Noahs nach der Sündflut, ca 1780. Copie after Nicolas Poussin, whereabouts unknown.
- Gottfried August Bürger liest im Jägerschen Haus in Göttingen seinen Freunden, dem Mediziner Johann Heinrich Jäger und dem Mathematiker Henrich Julius Oppermann, seine "Lenore" vor (Städtisches Museum Göttingen, Inv.-Nr. 1896/658), ca. 1785, 81 cm × 35,8 cm, Kohlezeichnung mit Weißhöhungen (unsignedt)
- Die Brüder Oppermann, J. H. Jäger und F. L. H. Waagen (Städtisches Museum Göttingen, Inv.-Nr. 1940/200), ca. 1785, oil
- Ruine Giebichenstein, nach der Natur gemalt, 1801, whereabouts unknown.
- Lochmühle im Liebetal bei Dresden, nach der Natur gemalt, 1801, whereabouts unknown.
- Ansicht im Plauenschengrunde, nach der Natur gemalt, 1801, whereabouts unknown.
- Landschafft, eigne Composizion, 1801, whereabouts unknown.
- Perseus befreit Andromeda, 1802, whereabouts unknown.
- Jupiter und Thetis, 1802, whereabouts unknown.
- Jugendbildnis Gustav Friedrich Waagen (Alte Nationalgalerie, Staatliche Museen zu Berlin, Id.-Nr. A I 1095) 1812, 36,5 cm × 30,3 cm, oil on wood (online)
