= Old Mine in Wałbrzych =

Museum in Poland

Coordinates: 50.77262°N 16.26180°E

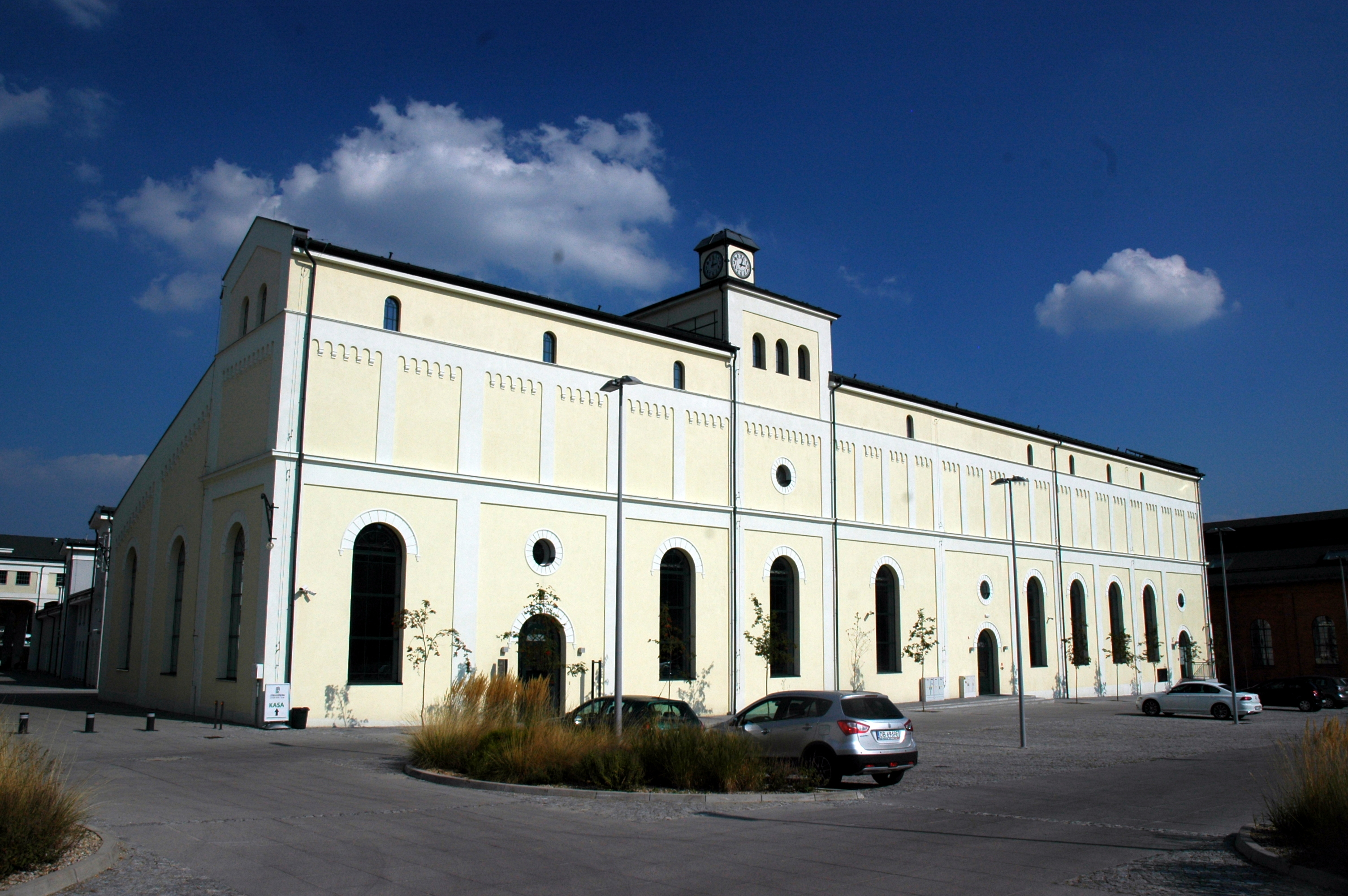
One of the buildings in the Old Mine

The Old Mine Science and Art Centre in Wałbrzych is a museum located in the historic Julia Coal Mine. It was opened on 9 November 2014 after a major expansion of the Museum of Industry and Technology located there since 1999. The Old Mine Science and Art Centre was included in 2015 on the list of the European Route of Industrial Heritage (ERIH).

== Facilities of the Old Mine Science and Art Centre ==
The center consists of:

- Museum of Industry and Technology.
  - Most of the objects belonging to the former mine were made available to the visitors, including the lamp room, the building of the hoisting machine, the upper part of the Julia mine shaft, mechanical workshops and the mine square with locomotives and transport vehicles. It is planned in the future to provide access to a fragment of the eighteenth-century Fox Adit located at a depth of 30 m (98 ft). The museum can be visited with a guide only; it is handicapped accessible.
- Center of Unique Ceramics in adapted post-industrial buildings,
- Gallery of Contemporary Art,
- Seat of the Wałbrzych Cultural Centre,
- Headquarters of the Wałbrzych Song and Dance Ensemble,

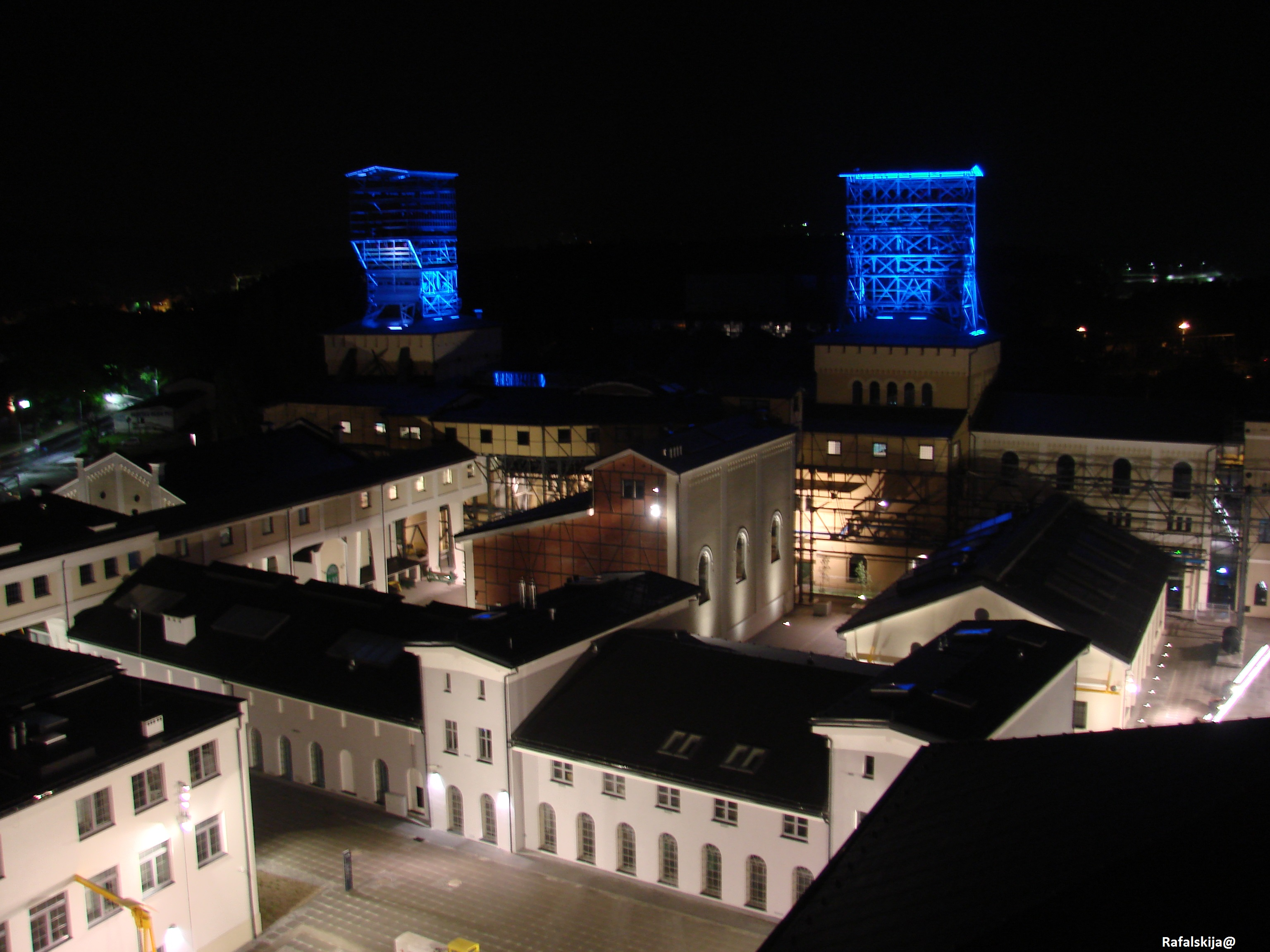
The Old Mine Science and Art Centre in Wałbrzych after renovation and adaptation

- Headquarters of non-governmental organizations and municipal cultural institutions on the premises of the former Julia coal mine in Wałbrzych.

== History ==
In 1770 a coal mine was registered in the Higher Mining Office in Reichenstein (Złoty Stok) under the name Fuchs, which was formed through the merger of numerous small mines in the area of Weißstein (Biały Kamień) since the 16th century. After the registration of the mining company, the exploitation of coal beds was carried out by surface excavations using adits and shafts. In 1867 a decision was made to deepen the Julius shaft (now called Julia), which ultimately reached a depth of 611 m (2,005 ft). Two years later the second mine shaft was drilled, Ida (now called Sobótka) at a distance of 55 m (180 ft) from the first shaft. Its deepening continued until 1946 when it reached the final depth of 443 m (1,453 ft) and opened five mining levels (ten coal seams). The hoisting equipment consisted of a two-story elevator (the so-called "cage"), which could accommodate two cars per floor. The hoisting capacity was 3 tons. In 1999 the shaft was backfilled with stone over a distance of about 400 m (1,300 ft) (a 50 m (160 ft) section from the surface was kept clear in order to access the stairs to the Fox Adit). In 1907, the mining area was enlarged by the incorporation of the David mine, which extracted coal from the neighbouring Konradów district, followed by the Segen Gottes mine in 1931 (Stary Zdrój district). After the end of World War II the Fuchs mine changed its name to Julia and came under Polish administration. Shortly, from 1946 to 1949, it was called White Stone, then from 1950 to 1993 Thorez (in honor of the French communist Maurice Thorez). In 1993, its name was reverted to Julia. The mine exploited coal deposits of the Wałbrzych strata, and the annual output ranged from 650,000 to 800,000 tons. The mine was declared bankrupt in 1990. The last truck with coal was brought to the surface on 20 September 1996, and on 17 September 1998, the liquidation of underground sections was completed.

=== Creation of the museum ===
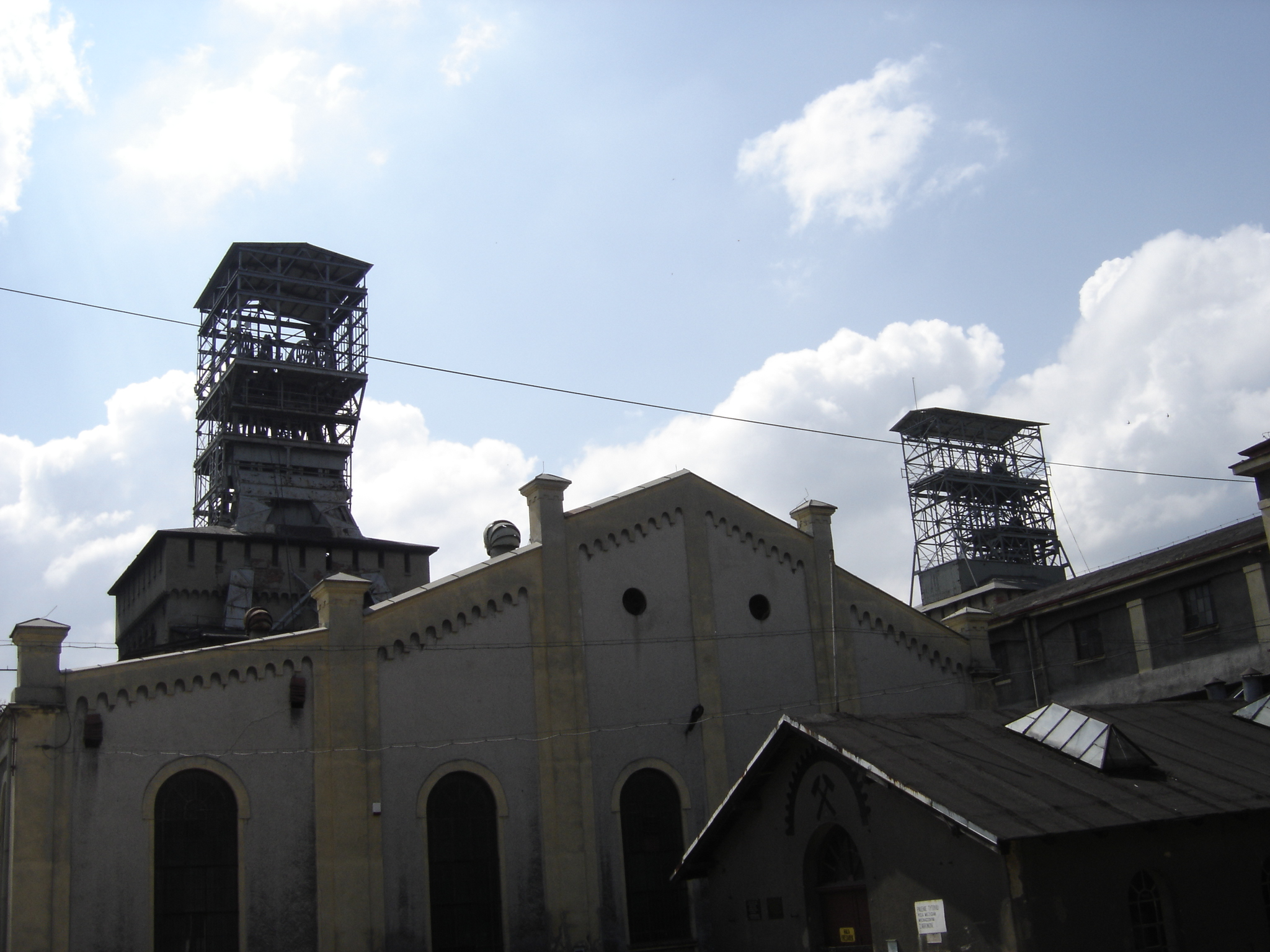
Hoisting towers of the shafts: Julia (on the left) and Sobótka (on the right)

On 26 August 1999, the Wałbrzych City Council passed a resolution to establish a branch of the Wałbrzych museum by changing the statute. On 31 December of the same year the administration of the city of Wałbrzych transferred the premises of the Julia mining plant on Wysockiego Street free of charge to the museum in order to establish a branch of the Museum of Industry and Technology. On 6 April 2001 the Lower Silesian Voivode transferred the ownership rights to the Julia coal mine (land and buildings with equipment) free of charge to the Wałbrzych commune with a perspective of running the Museum of Industry and Technology.

On 17 September 2004 the Voivodeship Monument Protection Office in Wrocław entered the complex of 14 mine buildings into the register of monuments of the Lower Silesian Voivodeship.

== Historical objects ==
The brick towers of the Julius (now Julia) and Ida (Sobótka) shafts have survived to the present day. They were built in the classic-Renaissance style. Since the 1850s this type of tower was commonly used in deep mines because of its solid structure, which could withstand the weight of the hoisting equipment placed in it and the excavated material. After the Crimean War, this type of tower became known as the Malakoff-Turm (name originating from the Malakov fort, also called Malakhov, in Sevastopol). At the end of the 19th century, in accordance with the then prevailing trends, steel towers were incorporated into the structure (Julius in 1893, Ida in 1903).

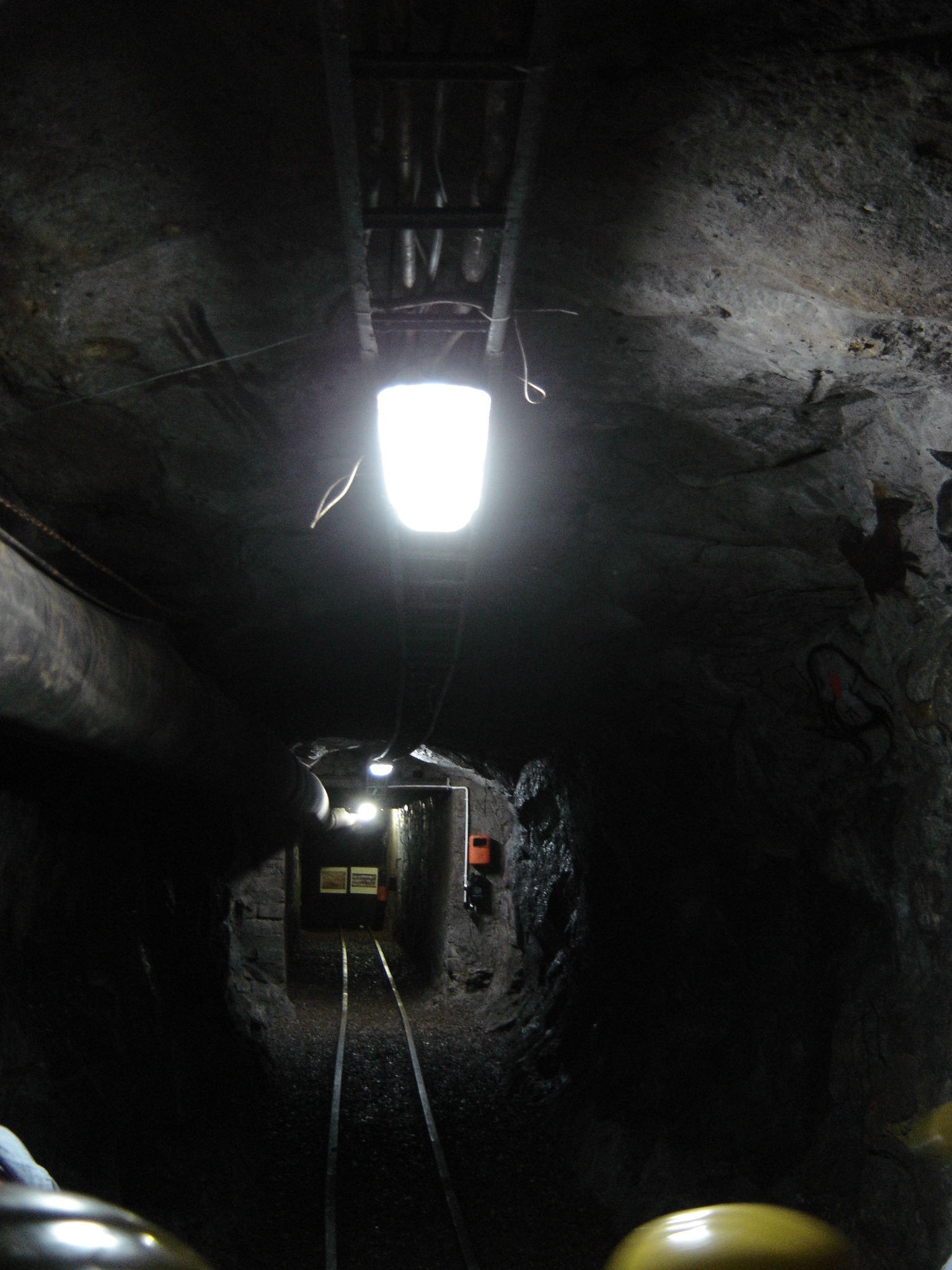
"Fox Adit" (2008)

During the deepening of the two shafts, boiler house No. 1 was built between them in a form of a tower with surrounding turrets. This three-story building, 15 meters (49 ft) high, was built on a brick foundation. In 1885, the boiler house was decommissioned and the interior of the building was adapted into a bathhouse and laundry. The third floor was used as a platform for the circulation of overhead carts. In 1915 a new bathhouse for miners was built nearby and the rooms near the shafts were used as a bathhouse for women working in the coal sorting plant and as a laundry and shaft storehouses.

In addition to these objects within the area of the former mine one can also find mechanical workshops from 1872, preserved machines and hoisting equipment of the Sobótka shaft from 1912, as well as a sorting plant from 1888 and a washing plant and coal flotation from the years 1902–1914.

== Exhibition ==
Tour:

=== The historic Julia Mine ===
- Bath
- Lamp room with a control room and a model of the Fox Adit;
- Hoisting machinery of the Julia shaft from 1911;
- Machines of the mechanical workshop;
- Large machinery and equipment of mine transport;
- Viewing tower built in place of the former cooling tower;
- The underground route – the training adit and the stone extraction tunnel – with mining machines and equipment for excavating and loading coal.

== Fox Adit ==
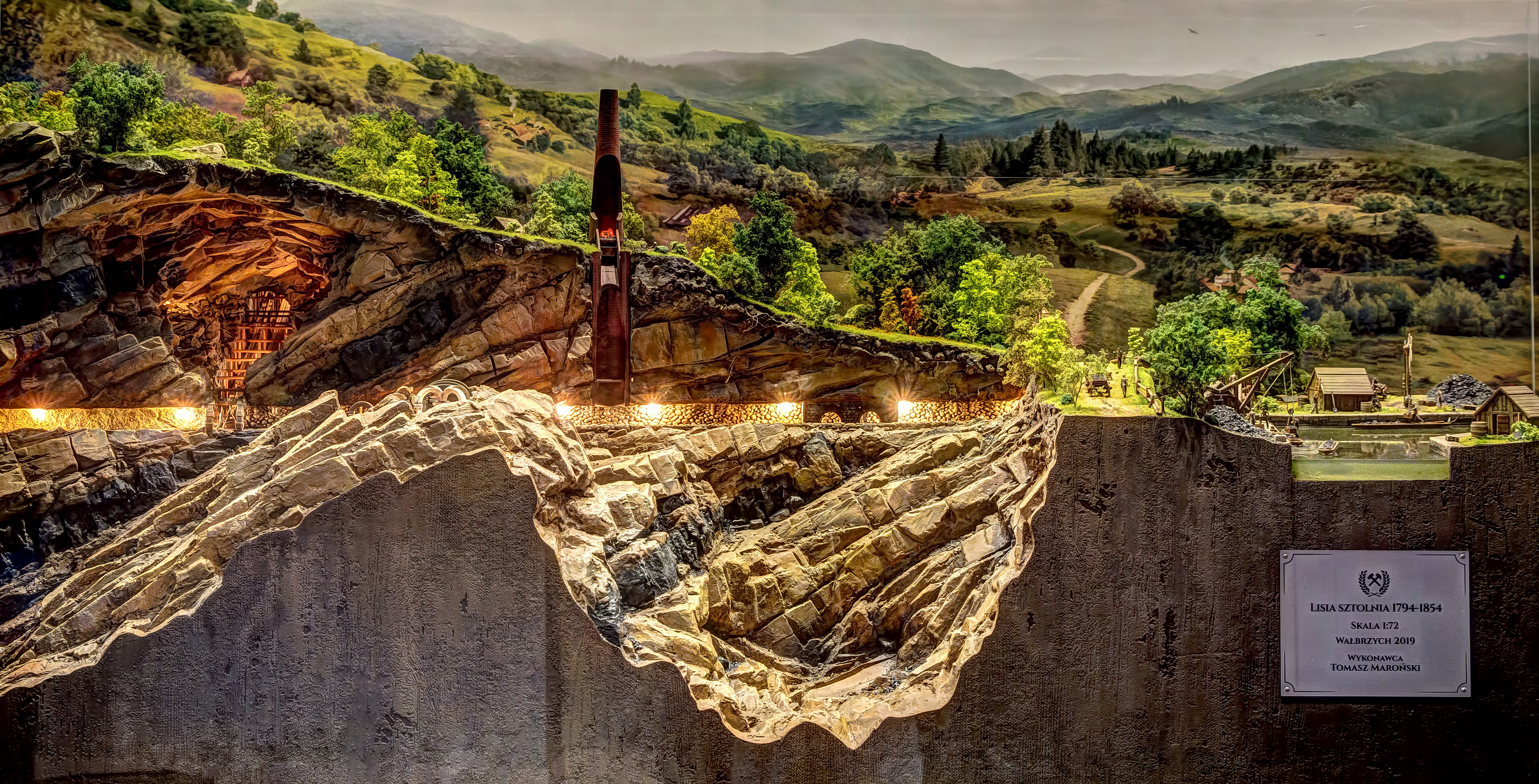
A model of the Fox Adit. Tomasz Maroński. (2019).

One of the most interesting objects belonging to the museum is the Fox Adit. Its uniqueness lies in the fact that it was filled with water to the height of 1 meter (3 ft 3 in) and coal was transported by boat. It was the first underground adit on the European continent adapted to such transport of coal, which was a great technical achievement in the 18th century.

The Fox Adit (located on Fox Hill – hence the name) started to be drilled in 1791 at the level of 410 m (1,350 ft) above sea level. When the adit reached the length of 655 m (2,149 ft) its further construction was suspended for some time and the tunnelling in coal beds was commenced. In September 1794 the water in the adit was raised to the height of 1 m (3 ft 3 in) by building a suitable dam. Friedrich Wilhelm von Reden (then director of the Higher Mining Authority in Breslau (Wrocław)) was the initiator of the tunnelling and especially of the idea of transporting coal by boat. He came across this method of excavation in the Harz Mountains, where in 1777 his uncle Claus Friedrich von Reden started the construction of a similar adit in local ore mines. The official opening of the adit that took place on 18 September 1794 and was commemorated by a stone plaque with a special carved inscription. Reden himself entered the adit in the first boat, and the first boat leaving it was already loaded with coal.

The adit was drilled until 1821. It cut through the rocks providing miners with access to 12 coal seams 0.9–2.9 m (2 ft 11 in – 9 ft 6 in) thick. Depending on the mining and geological situation, the adit was equipped with a stone wall lining (46%), a wooden lining (17%), and no lining in places with compact, strong rocks in the ceiling and in the walls. During the tunnelling process skylights were made every 100–200 m (330–660 ft) to improve ventilation (now bricked up and buried). The total length of the tunnel was 1,593 m (5,226 ft) its width reached 2.7 m (8 ft 10 in) and its height 2.9 m (9 ft 6 in). At intervals of 300 m (980 ft) the excavation was widened to 3.8 m (12 ft) to allow boats sailing in opposite directions to pass each other. In the final period (1854) the navigation passage (for boat traffic) was 2,100 m (6,900 ft) long and one boat cycle lasted about three hours. The daily output of the adit with this type of extraction was about 100 tons. For efficient unloading of coal, which was done largely by hand, a harbour basin with an area of approximately 650 m^{2} (7,000 sq ft) was built at the mouth of the adit, with appropriately equipped quays, which could accommodate up to 50 boats. In 1854, the high demand for coal influenced the decision to remove the water from the mine, build a track and introduce horses to pull the carts. This increased the mine's capacity to 480 tons per day. In 1867 the Julia shaft was deepened to the adit level, which made it possible to pull the excavated material through the shaft. The adit stopped being used as a transport road and was dammed the same year.

The adit was opened to tourists from the beginning of its existence. Visitors included: Frederick William III with his wife Frederica Louisa (1801), the United States ambassador in Berlin John Quincy Adams – future president, the wife of Tsar Nicholas I – Alexandra Fyodorovna (1838), as well as Princess Izabela Czartoryska (1816), who described the adit's appearance and the way of visiting it in her memoirs Dyliżansem po Dolnym Śląsku.

On 26 May 1961 the Fox Adit, as a unique technical monument documenting the history of mining in Wałbrzych, was entered in the register of monuments.

After the Branch of the Museum of Industry and Technology of the Regional Museum in Wałbrzych was created in 1995, the Julia mining plant was inspected in order to adapt it for tourist purposes. At that time only 340 m (1,120 ft) of the adit were passable. In 2000–2001 the adit was made accessible and repaired on the length of 1,302 m (4,272 ft). The plans included, among others, building a passenger elevator in the Sobótka shaft to take tourists down from the surface to the level of the adit, as well as constructing a 300 m (980 ft) long water channel to float tourists on boats. However, it was discovered that due to the exploitation of the coal seams located below, the adit level decreased significantly, locally even by 13.21 m (43.3 ft). When in 2001 Wałbrzych Coal Mines in Liquidation, for economical reasons, changed the project of securing the town's buildings against the water hazard as a result of sinking of underground coal mines, it turned out that the major part of the planned route would most probably be flooded. Therefore, on 1 June 2002, the museum opened only the 201 m (659 ft) long exit section of the Fox Adit and a 69 m (226 ft) long exit ramp at Reja St. for tourist foot traffic.

The adit was already flooded as a result of heavy rainfall in August of the same year. The site was closed for tourists. At the same time, ventilation conditions deteriorated, carbon dioxide accumulated and oxygen content decreased. This had tragic consequences in 2014, when two men stealing scrap metal died as a result of suffocation in the depths of the adit, officially inaccessible. The project to further revitalize the adit was suspended. As of 2021, the entrance to the Fox Adit is closed and the site is not accessible. A road overpass of the western bypass of Wałbrzych is being built over the adit. As of 2019, a highly detailed model of the historic Fox Adit is included in the tour of the museum.
