= Waagen =

Waagen is a surname. Notable people with the surname include:

- Adalbert Waagen (1833–1898), German painter
- Carl Waagen (1800–1873), German painter and lithographer
- Gustav Friedrich Waagen (1794–1868), German art historian
- Wilhelm Heinrich Waagen (1841–1900), German geologist and paleontologist
