= Weisstein =

Weisstein (German for "white stone") can refer to:

== People ==
- Eric W. Weisstein (born 1969), American encyclopedist
- Naomi Weisstein (1939–2015), American cognitive psychologist, neuroscientist, author, and professor

== Places ==
- Paide, Estonia
- Bilyi Kamin, Lviv Oblast, Ukraine
- Weisstein, Waldenburg
