= Nanette Schechner =

German operatic soprano

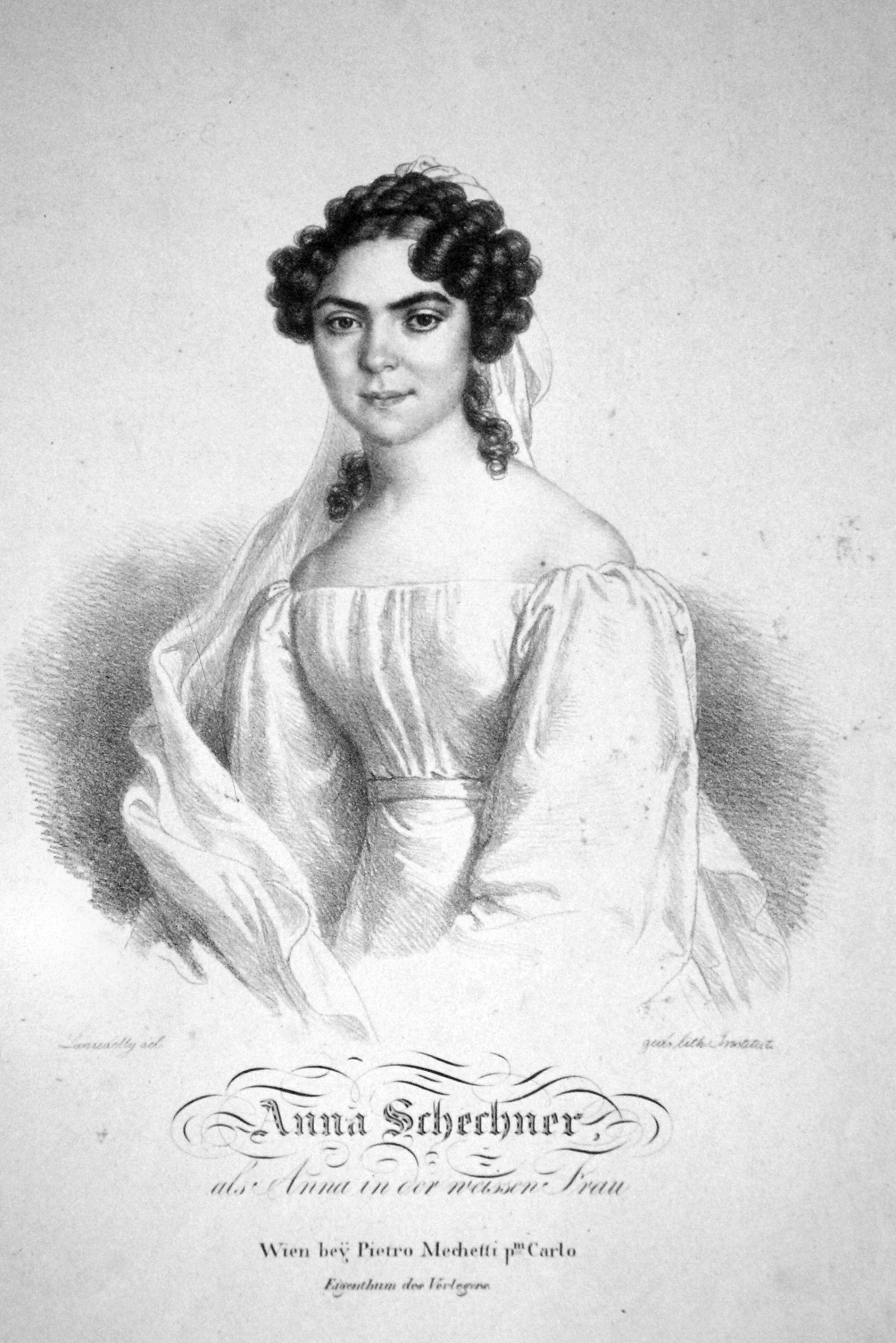
Anna Schechner as Weiße Dame in François-Adrien Boieldieus La dame blanche, Lithograph by Joseph Lanzedelly the Elder, ca. 1830

Nanette Schechner, real name Anna Schechner, married name Anna Schechner-Waagen, (3 February 1804 – 29 April 1860) was a German operatic soprano.

== Life and career ==
Born in Munich, Schechner was a daughter of the Munich mechanic and inventor Xaver Schechner. She received her first piano and singing lessons from an actor. She then came under the care of the theatre choir singing mistress Dorothea Güthe and took part in the chorus of the Italian opera. Her talent was soon noticed, so that the director of the Italian court opera gave her to the singing institute of Ferdinando Orlandi for further training. When the celebrated contralto Giuseppina Grassini (1773 in Varese – 1850 in Milan) wanted to appear in the opera Gli Orazi e i Curiazi by Domenico Cimarosa in Munich at the beginning of the 1820s, only Schechner could be entrusted with the portrayal of Curiazio. Although barely trained, the beauty and richness of her voice so outshone the means and skill of the already ageing Grassini that she sang less well than usual. Orlandi henceforth paid special attention to the Schechner and taught her the solfeggio, while Domenico Ronconi rehearsed roles with her. When she sang with Henriette Méric-Lalande, as she had with Grassini, in 1825, she also shone alongside her with her conception and strong will, and achieved high results everywhere. She had already been engaged by the Italian Opera in 1821; in July 1822 she appeared for the first time as Servilia in Titus and soon also sang Ännchen in Der Freischütz. From 1 October she was then also recruited for the German opera, to which she was then exclusively assigned from 1 July 1825.

She sang Fidelio with great success in this year and also went on tours (among others after Stuttgart and Karlsruhe). In the spring of 1826, she left Munich and went first to Vienna. She made her debut as Emmeline in Die Schweizer Familie at the Kärntnertortheater with outstanding success, and was compared to the young Anna Milder. In Rossini's La gazza ladra she achieved the greatest triumphs. However, as she did not receive adequate offers, she soon moved to Berlin, where she also made the greatest sensation. She was able to perform Glucks and Mozart's operas with equal aplomb as the French and more recent Italian repertoire. She appeared as Agathe in the Freischütz, as well as Julia in Spontini's La Vestale and Gluck roles.

When Schechner returned to Munich, she had to replace the recently deceased Clara Vespermann (1800 - 6 March 1827). She now played with the greatest success Agathe in Freischütz, Fatime (in Oberon), the Crusader in Il crociato in Egitto (by Giacomo Meyerbeer) and Lady Macbeth (in Macbeth by Hippolyte André Jean Baptiste Chélard).

Schechner was engaged to the singer Ludwig Cramolini in Vienna in 1826/27 and married the lithographer and painter Carl Waagen on 17 October 1831 and now performed as Schechner-Waagen. However, her presence on stage became less frequent due to pregnancy and failing health. In 1833, she appeared again in Gluck's Iphigénie en Tauride, but overworked herself with several other roles. Having lost her voice, she retired on 1 December 1834.

Her sons were the ennobled major general Gustav von Waagen (1832-1906), the painter Adalbert Waagen (1834-1898), and the geologist Wilhelm Heinrich Waagen (1841-1900). The geologist Lukas Waagen (1877-1959) was one of their grandsons.
