= Rusinowa =

Town in Poland

- Dzielnica
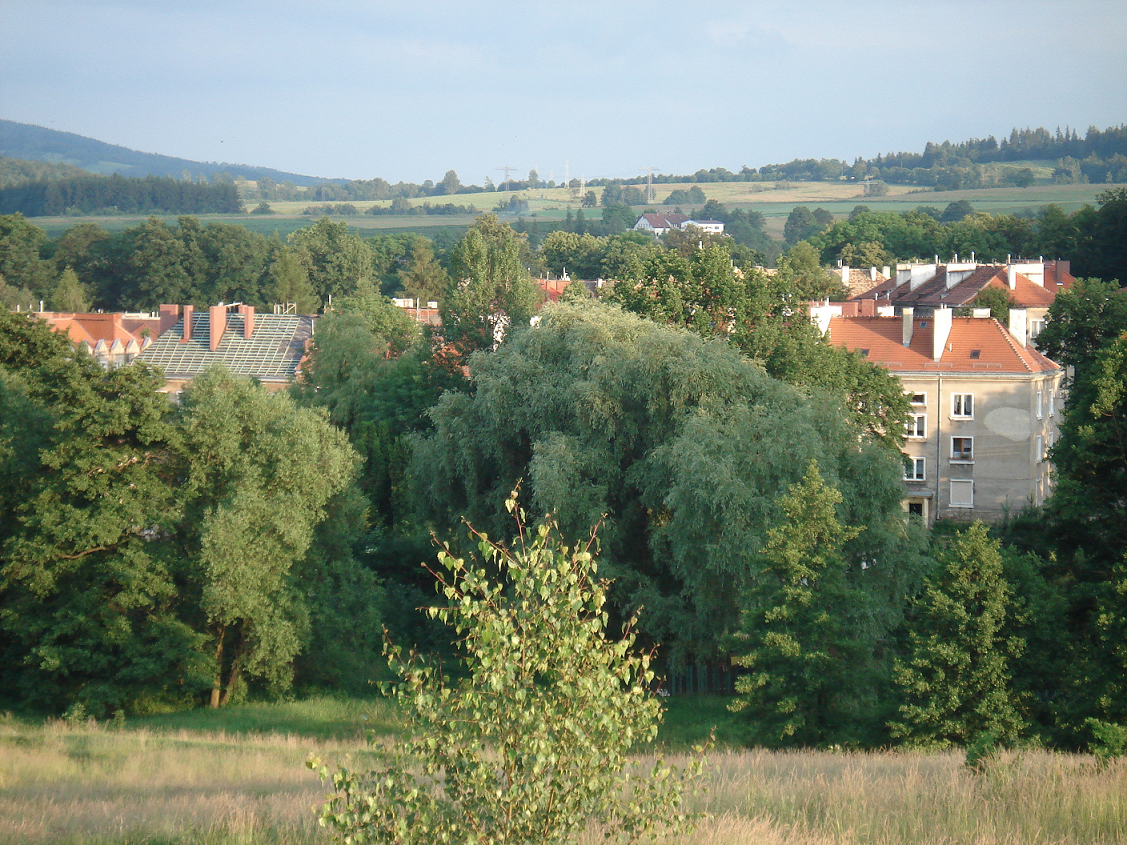

- Location within Poland
- Coordinates: 50°45′43.2″N 16°20′13.56″E
- Country: Poland
- Voivodeship: Lower Silesian
- City: Wałbrzych
- SIMC: 0983770

Rusinowa (German: Reußendorf) is a dzielnica of the town Wałbrzych. It was first mentioned in the Latin document Liber fundationis episcopatus Vratislaviensis from around 1305 as villa ottonis; since the end of the 14th century, it is called Reußendorf; in 1945 it was renamed Rusinowa.

The "castle" of Carl Robert Tielsch is located in Rusinowa; after the Polish transition in 1945, it served as an orphanage and a school.

The organist Gerhard Schwarz was born in the city in 1902.
