= Eduard Cramolini =

Austrian painter and photographer

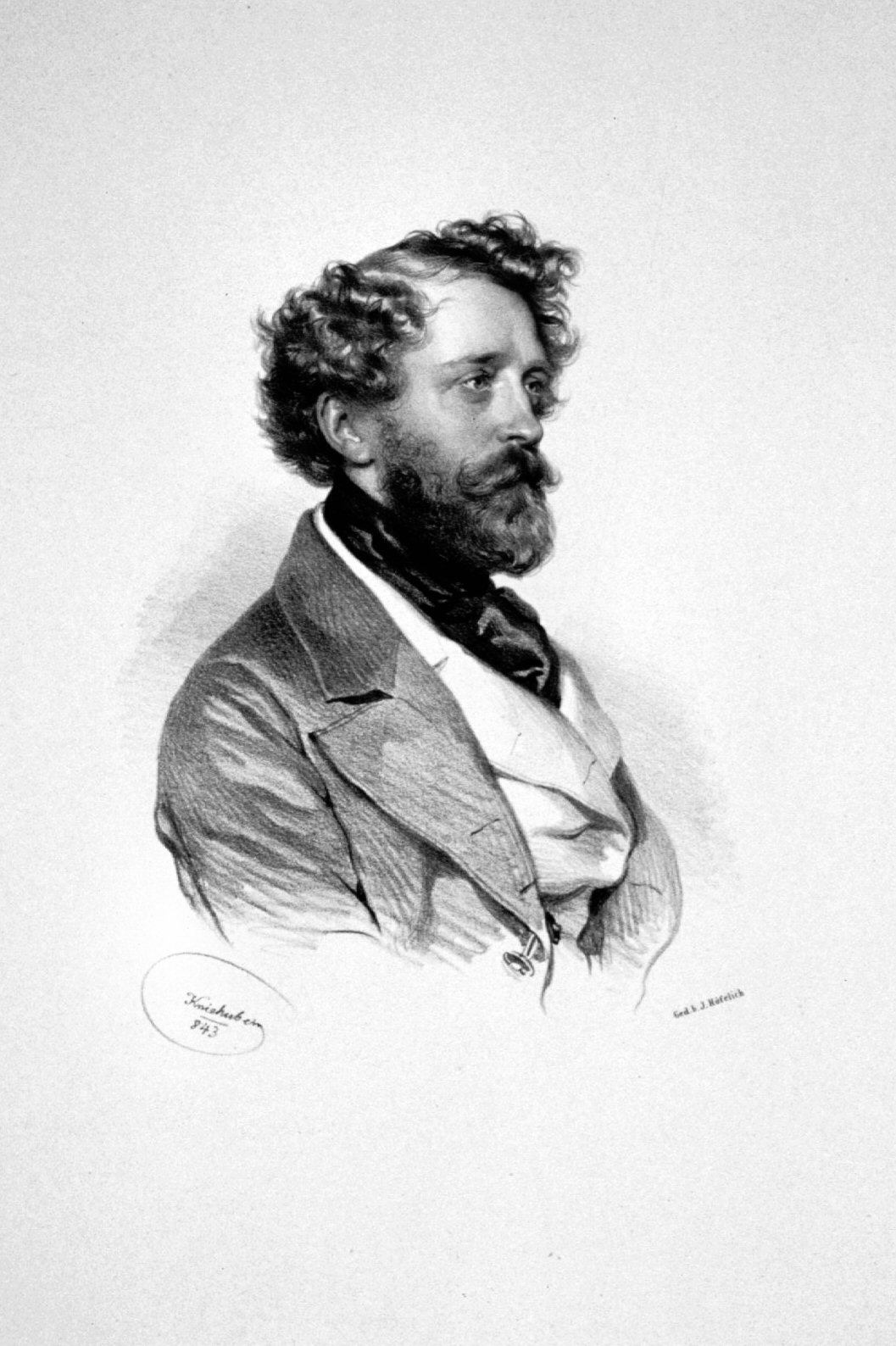
Eduard Cramolini, Lithograph by Josef Kriehuber (1843)

Eduard Cramolini (16 July 1807 – 13 October 1881) also Eduard Kramolin) was an Austrian painter and photographer.

== Life ==
Born in Vienna, Cramolini belonged to the artist family Kramolin from Bohemia, which changed its name to the italianised Cramolini. His father was a mandolin player, his brother Ludwig Cramolini an opera singer and his son Heinrich Cramolini an architect.

Cramolini studied drawing intermittently at the Academy of Fine Arts Vienna from 1823 to 1826. He worked as a portraitist and lithographer and, from about 1860, as a photographer. He was also active as a collector of valuable antiques.

Cramolini was very well connected in the Viennese artistic scene of his time. He was a member of the Künstlerhaus, Gesellschaft bildender Künstler Österreichs and its predecessor associations Eintracht and Albrecht-Dürer-Verein as well as the association Grüne Insel. According to a tradition, the Austrian name Gschnas for a costume festival is said to go back to him. In an obituary in the Neue Freie Presse, Cramolini was characterised as "a Viennese in the Vormärz sense of the word: open, straight, coarse and quick-witted, and always ready for original ideas and coarse-grained jokes."

Cramolini died in Vienna at the age of 74.

The Cramolinigasse in Vienna-Atzgersdorf was named after him in 1954.
