= Ludwig Cramolini =

Austrian operatic tenor and theatre director

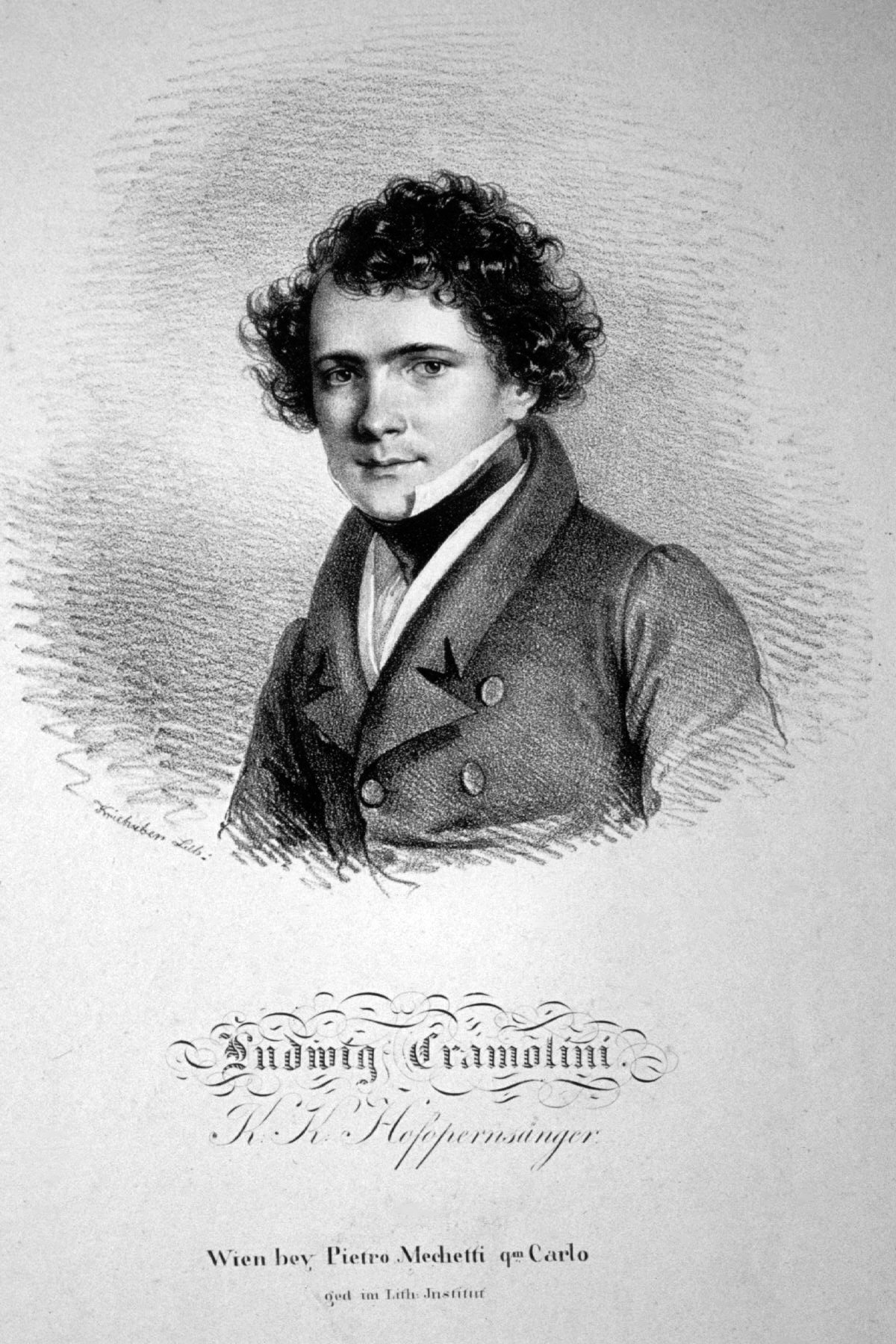
Ludwig Cramolini, lithograph by Josef Kriehuber (1800–1876)

Ludwig Joseph Cramolini, real name Ludwig Joseph Kramolin (20 March 1805 – 28 October 1884) was an Austrian operatic tenor and theatre director.

== Life ==
Born in Vienna in Austrian Empire, Cramolini first began studying painting at the Academy of Fine Arts Vienna on 20 July 1819, but then switched to music. On 27 February 1824, he made his Vienna debut in the opera Joconde by Nicolas Isouard and was subsequently engaged at the Theater am Kärntnertor until 1837. In 1826/27 he was engaged to the opera singer Nanette Schechner, and he also belonged to the circle of friends around Franz Schubert. He also met Ludwig van Beethoven several times, whom he first visited in Mödling in 1818, the last time in February 1827, together with his fiancée. He left extensive memories of both composers.

From 1837, Cramolini was active in Brunswick, where he enjoyed great popularity and William, Duke of Brunswick had him portrayed for his private gallery. In 1841, he became a member of the court theatre in Darmstadt, where he again enjoyed great triumphs and also worked as an opera director from February 1858. In 1874, he celebrated his 50th anniversary as an artist and retired soon after.

Cramolini died in Darmstadt on 28 October 1884. A letter from Remigius Adrianus Haanen to Cramolini has survived from the Darmstadt period.

== Family ==
Cramolini was a son of the painter Johann Baptist Cramolini (1776–1843), who came from Bohemia. from his marriage to Anna Englbert. His brother was the painter Eduard Cramolini (1807–1881).
