= Gerhard Schwarz =

Gerhard Schwarz (22 August 1902 – 13 October 1995) was a German church musician, organist and composer.

== Life ==
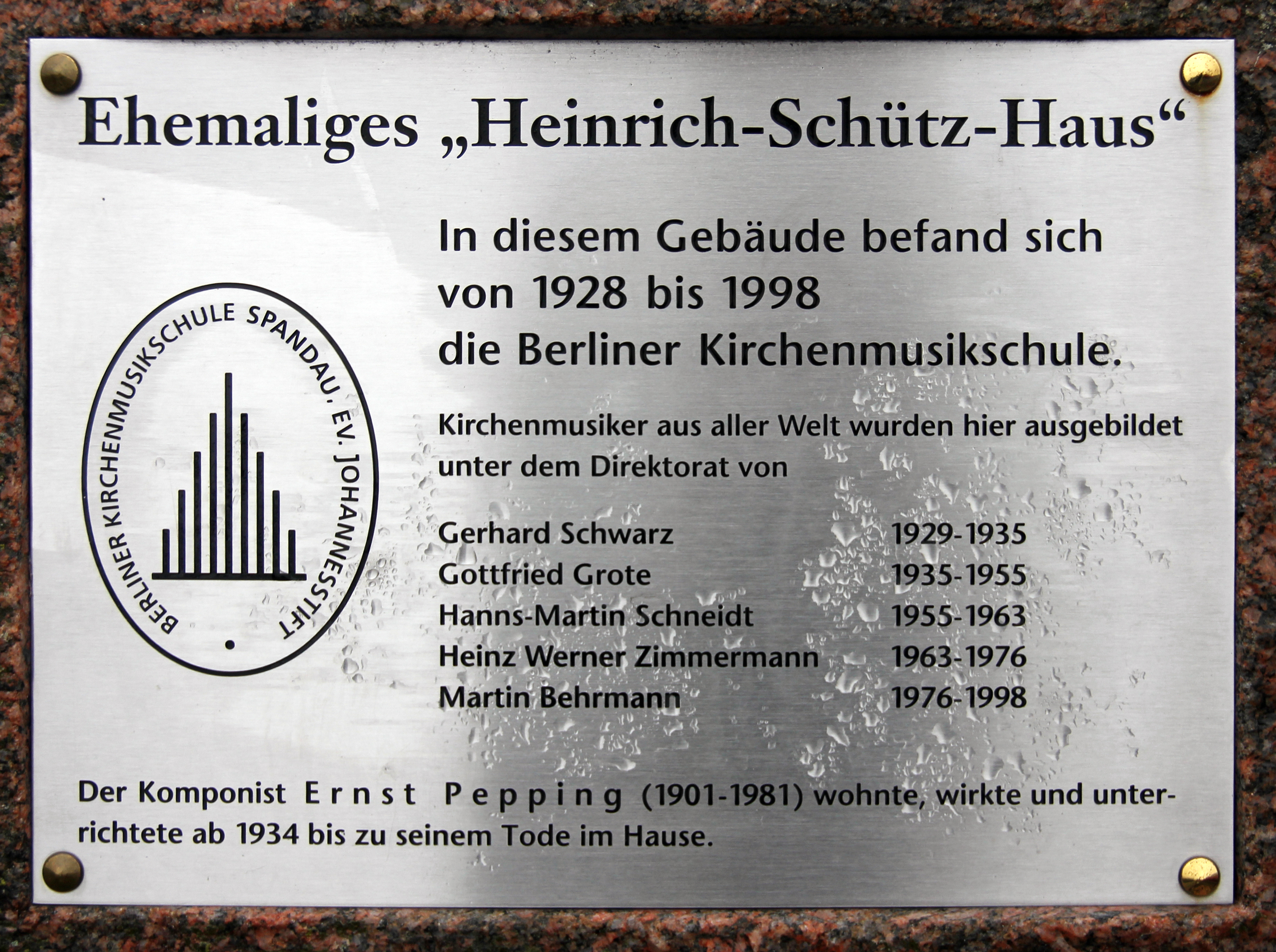
Commemorative plaque at "Janusz-Korczak-Haus", Schönwalder Allee 26, in Berlin-Hakenfelde

Born in Rusinowa (near Waldenburg), Silesia, Schwarz studied church, and school music, philosophy and musicology in Berlin. On 1 November 1932, he became a member of the NSDAP (member number 1.467.044). Schwarz founded the Spandauer Kirchenmusikschule and was organist at the new church in Berlin.

After the "Machtergreifung" of the National Socialists, he edited the flag song of the NSDAP and subsequently composed various pieces of popular music in the spirit of National Socialism. In 1934 he became a clerk at the Reichsjugendpfarrer. In addition, he was music advisor at the Oberbann Süd of the Hitlerjugend of the Kurmark but was removed from this office in 1936 because of suspicion of homosexuality. 1940 he was organist in Düsseldorf. In 1941 he was drafted into the Wehrmacht, of which he was a member until 1945. He served as a corporal in the Silesian Landes-Schützen-Bataillon 590 and was, among other things, deployed in Świdnica to guard prisoners. In 1944 he became chief organist of Sankt Bernhard in Breslau.

In 1946 he first moved to Erfurt. In 1947 Schwarz became a teacher at the music academies in Leipzig and Berlin. In 1949 he moved to Düsseldorf, where he became director of the Landeskirchenmusikschule der Evangelischen Kirche im Rheinland and organist of the Johanneskirche. In 1961 he became professor for improvisation at the Hochschule für Musik Köln. In 1968 he received the Johann-Wenzel Stamitz Prize.

His successor at the Johanneskirche, Düsseldorf in 1967 was Almut Rößler.

In the Soviet occupation zone was Schwarz's book Eine Trommel geht in Deutschland um (Bärenreiter-Verlag, Kassel 1935) put on the list of literature to be excluded.

Schwarz died in the Kommunität Imshausen near Bebra at age 93.

== Work ==
- Melodie zum Weihnachtslied Also liebt Gott die arge Welt in Evangelisches Gesangbuch (Nr. 51)
- An die Freunde
- Kleiner Kalender (1938) for four-part choir
