= Adalbert Waagen =

German landscape painter

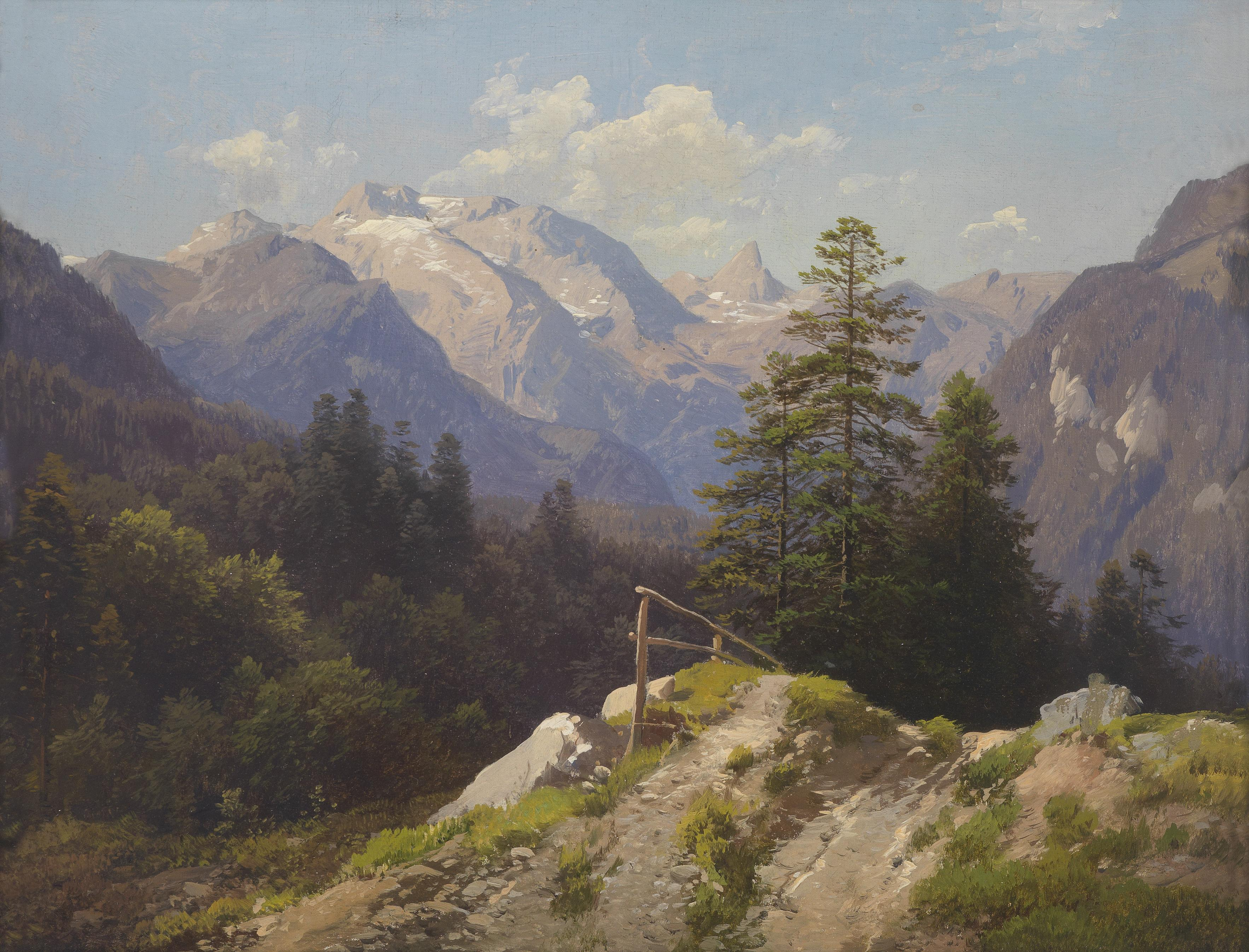
Mountain Motif (The Funtenseetauern and Schönfeldspitze)

Adalbert Waagen (30 March 1833 – 15 April 1898) was a German landscape painter.

== Biography ==
Waagen was born in Munich. His father was the artist Carl Waagen. His first lessons were with a watercolorist named Fritz Zeiss. From 1855 to 1858, he studied with Albert Zimmermann in Munich, then accompanied him on a study trip to Milan. The following year, he was commissioned by Prince Georg to create frescoes at the Villa Carlotta on Lake Como. After completing them, he went back to Munich and established his own studio in the home of his friend, Carl Millner, who was also a landscape painter. He made regular painting expeditions to the southern mountains.

In 1868, a wealthy uncle of his died, and he inherited a villa in Berchtesgaden. He moved there with his new wife in 1869 and opened a studio, with a direct view of Mount Watzmann. He soon received commissions from throughout Europe. For many years, he worked on a project of designing landscapes related to the Nibelungenlied, to be made into frescoes at Neuschwanstein Castle, but the project never came to full fruition.

Despite his successes, he was almost brought to ruin from medical expenses, incurred in treating the after effects of a snake bite. He also suffered from sleepwalking, which his neighbor, the writer Richard Voss, used as inspiration for a novel. Later, he had a stroke and was left with a nervous disorder. A stay in Wiesbaden in 1880 brought some relief, but his eyesight soon began to fade. He eventually succumbed to a cancerous growth in his stomach, and died in Berchtesgaden.

His focus was on landscapes; primarily with mountains. His style was influenced by his mentor, Zimmermann, by way of Joseph Anton Koch.

Luitpold, Prince Regent of Bavaria awarded him the honorary title of Royal Professor in 1891. His works may be seen at the Nasher Museum of Art at Duke University, Martin von Wagner Museum, the Julius-Maximilians-Universität Würzburg and the Münchner Stadtmuseum.

== Sources ==
- Hyacinth Holland (1908). "Waagen, Adalbert" . Allgemeine Deutsche Biographie (in German). Vol. 54. Leipzig: Duncker & Humblot. pp. 778–780.
- (in German) Waagen, Adalbert. In: Ulrich Thieme, Felix Becker (editors): Allgemeines Lexikon der Bildenden Künstler von der Antike bis zur Gegenwart. Band 35, E. A. Seemann, Leipzig 1942, S. 1.
