= Gaudenz Taverna =

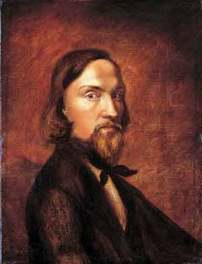
Self-portrait (c.1850)

Gaudenz Taverna (12 October 1814, Chur - 22 October 1878, Solothurn) was a Swiss portrait painter and graphic artist.

== Biography ==
His father was an innkeeper and warden. He began his art studies at the Accademia di San Luca in Rome. After that, he spent some time in Munich. Upon returning, he divided his time between Chur and Zürich. In 1841, he married Christina Walther von Tartar of Graubünden.

In 1847, he became a drawing teacher at the Kantonsschule of Solothurn. Three years later, he was one of the founders of the Solothurner Kunstvereins (artists' association). He also drew caricatures for the satirical weekly, Postheiri, from Thurgau.

His paintings are mostly in the Biedermeier style. His works may be seen at the Kunstmuseum Solothurn and the Bündner Kunstmuseum in Chur.
