= Carl Waagen =

19th-century German painter

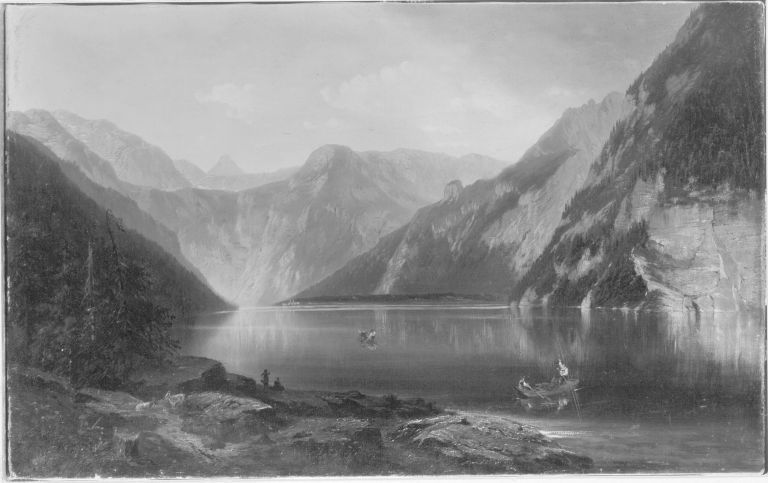
Carl Waagen: Der Königssee vom Malerwinkel aus (1872), Munich, Bavarian State Painting Collections Inv. 12584

Carl Waagen (1800 – 26 November 1873 in Munich) was a German painter and lithographer.

== Life ==
Born in Hambourg, Waagen was the son of the painter Friedrich Ludwig Heinrich Waagen (1750-1825) and his wife Johanna Louise Alberti († 1807), his elder brother was the art scholar Gustav Friedrich Waagen (1794-1868). He studied at the Hochschule für Bildende Künste Dresden and the Academy of Fine Arts, Prague, and he learned fresco painting at the Akademie der Bildenden Künste München from 1820. In Breslau, Waagen worked as a portrait painter and then for two years as a restorer at the Berlin Museum. After a stay in Rome from 1827 to 1828, he settled in Munich.

He made portraits (oil paintings and miniatures), landscapes and history paintings as well as lithographs, among others with the portrait of the emperor Pedro I of Brazil.

On 17 October 1831, he married the singer Nanette Schechner (1806-1860), of whom he also made a lithograph. Their sons were the ennobled Maj. Gen. Gustav von Waagen (1832–1906), the painter Adalbert Waagen (1833–1898) as well as the geologist Wilhelm Heinrich Waagen (1841–1900).
