= Carl Tielsch =

German businessman

Carl Robert Tielsch (1815–1882) was a German merchant who founded the Carl Tielsch & Co. Porcelain Manufactury in Altwasser, Lower Silesia, Prussia.

== Carl Tielsch & Co. ==
In 1845, encouraged by Carl Krister's results as a porcelain entrepreneur, Tielsch founded the porcelain factory Carl Tielsch & Co. alongside a business partner Gideon von Wallenberg (a banker from Breslau), in the locality of Altwasser (today Stary Zdrój, a district of Wałbrzych). Its porcelain became sought after in Germany and abroad, and it is identified by its label mark on the bottom CT ALTWASSER and formally known as "Tielsch Porzellan-Manufaktur".

In 1861, Tielsch was awarded the title of the Prussian Royal Trade Counsellor in acknowledgment of his contribution to the Silesian industry.

His son Egmont Tielsch became his successor.

The Tielsch factory is producing to the present day Poland and is now called "Fabryka Porcelany Wałbrzych S.A." and marked "P.T. Tielsch Walbrzych".
