= Carl Millner =

German landscape painter (1825–1895)

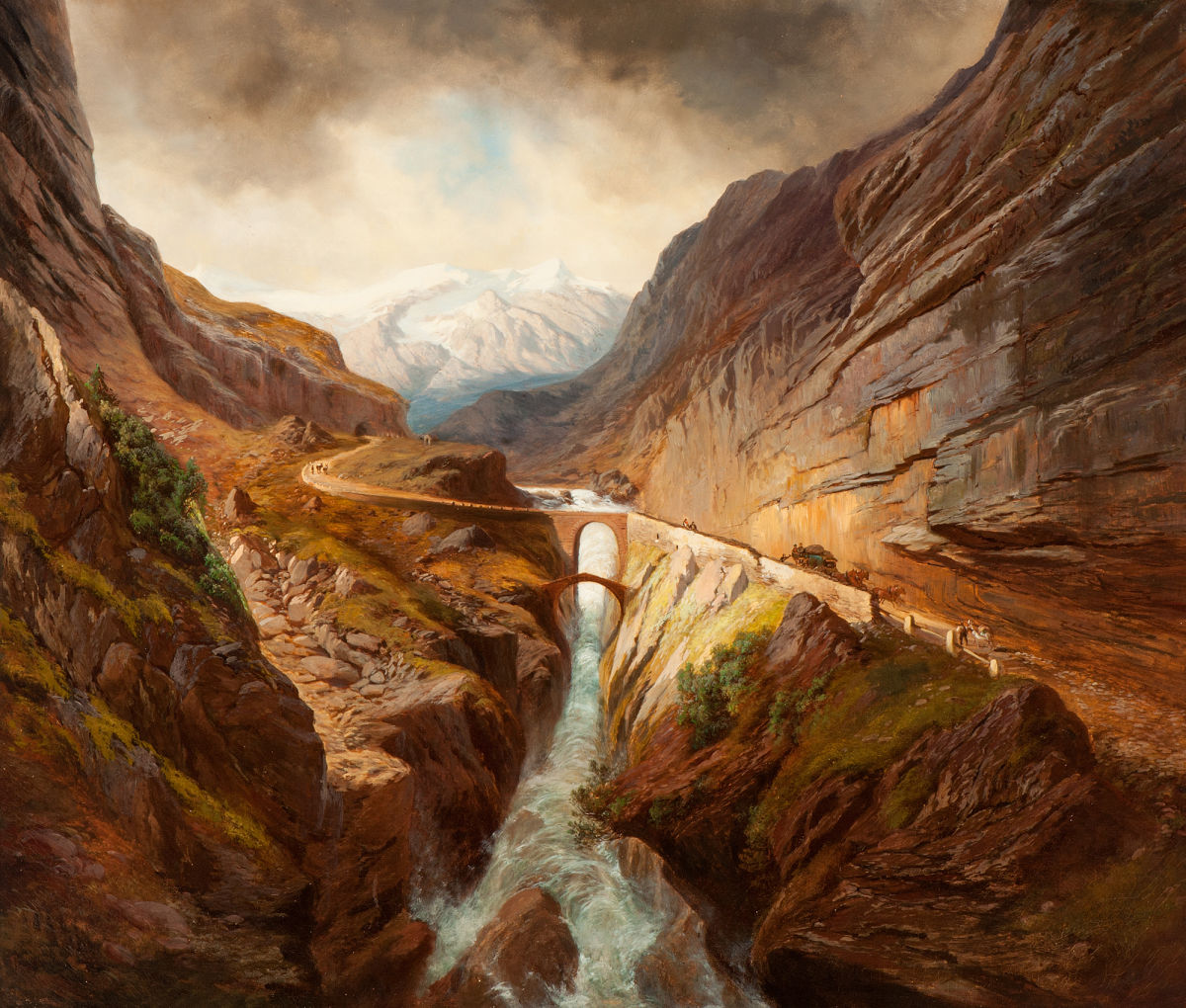
The Devil's Bridge in Gotthard Pass

Carl Millner (25 March 1825, Mindelheim – 19 May 1895, Munich) was a German landscape painter.

== Biography ==
Around 1850, he moved from Mindelheim to Munich, to improve his artistic skills. There, he came under the influence of Carl Rottmann and Eduard Schleich. He quickly established himself as a successful artist and was best known for his popular Alpine landscapes; meticulously rendered with fine details and great attention to light and shadow.

In 1857, he became associated with the art dealer, Daniel Loffel, and achieved financial stability. After 1858, he took further lessons from Julius Lange. Later, he accepted numerous young apprentices for lessons in his studio.

In 2012, the Carl-Millner-Galerie was opened in his hometown of Mindelheim.

== Sources ==
- "Millner, Karl". In: Hans Vollmer (Ed.): Allgemeines Lexikon der Bildenden Künstler von der Antike bis zur Gegenwart, Vol.24: Mandere–Möhl. E. A. Seemann, Leipzig 1930, pg.570
- Christian Schedler, Landschaftsträume. Carl Millner und die Münchner Landschaftsmalerei im 19. Jahrhundert. Exhibition at the Jesuit College in Mindelheim, Kulturamt, 2006
