= Stary Zdrój =

- District of Wałbrzych
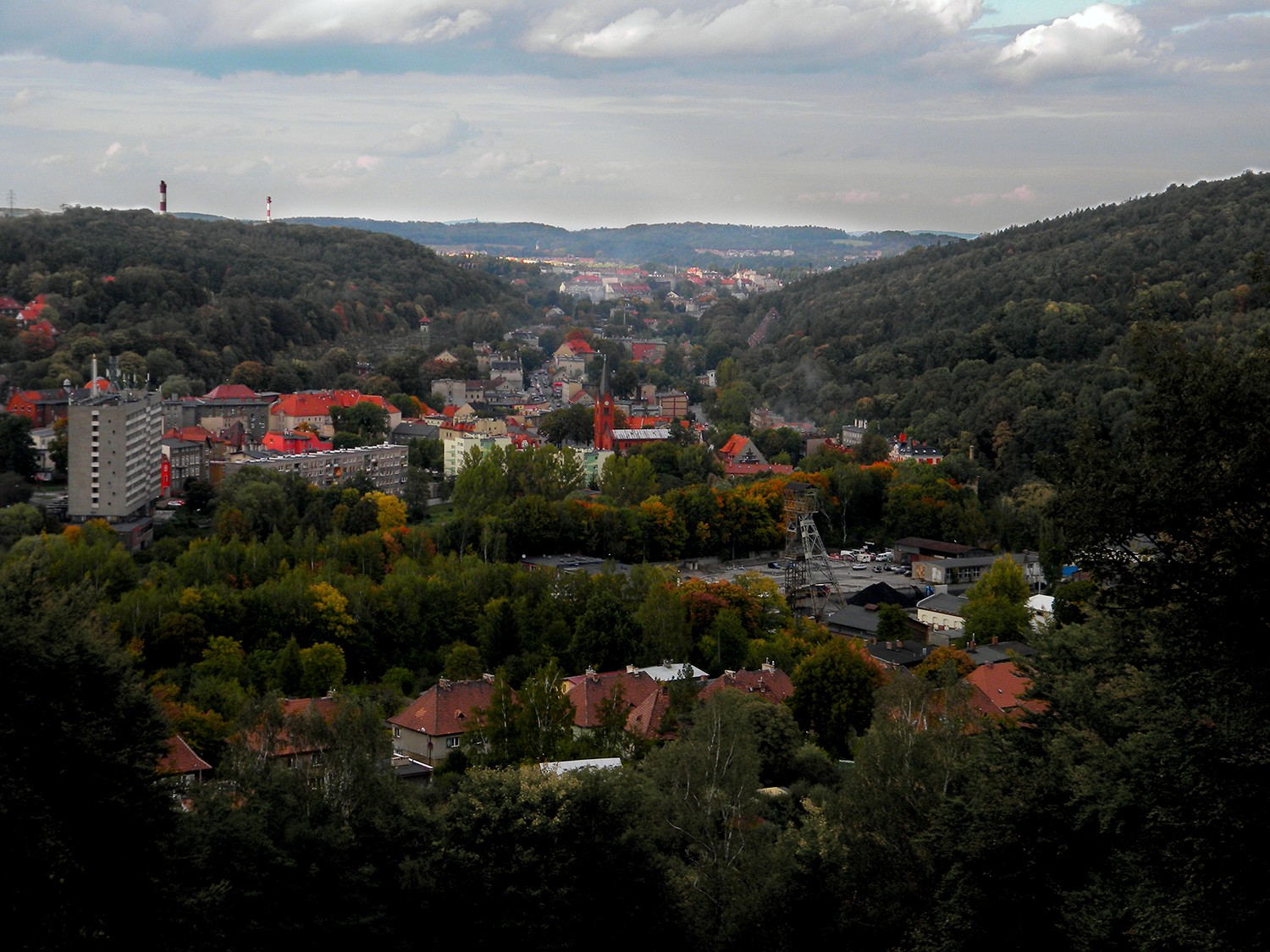
- View from the King John III Sobieski Park

- Location within Poland Location within Lower Silesian Voivodeship
- Coordinates: 50°46′43″N 16°17′50″E
- Country: Poland
- Voivodeship: Lower Silesian
- County/city: Wałbrzych
- First mentioned: 1357

Population (2014)
  - Total: 8,601
- Time zone: UTC+1 (CET)
  - Summer (DST): UTC+2 (CEST)
- Area code: +48 74

Stary Zdrój (German: Altwasser) is a district of the city of Wałbrzych in southwestern Poland.

Formerly a spa town, it is located 43 m. by rail S.W. from Wrocław, and 3 m. N. from centre of Wałbrzych. It has factories for glass, porcelain (Fabryka Porcelany Wałbrzych S.A.), machinery, cotton-spinning, iron-foundries and used to have coal-mines.

The oldest known mention of the settlement comes from a 1357 document from the nearby Krzeszów Abbey, when it was under Polish rule as part of the Duchy of Świdnica. Stanisław Poniatowski stayed in Stary Zdrój in 1784. In 1900 the population was 12,144.

There are two historic churches and a railway station in Stary Zdrój.

== Transport ==
Wałbrzych Miasto railway station lit. 'Wałbrzych City' is located in the district.

== Gallery ==
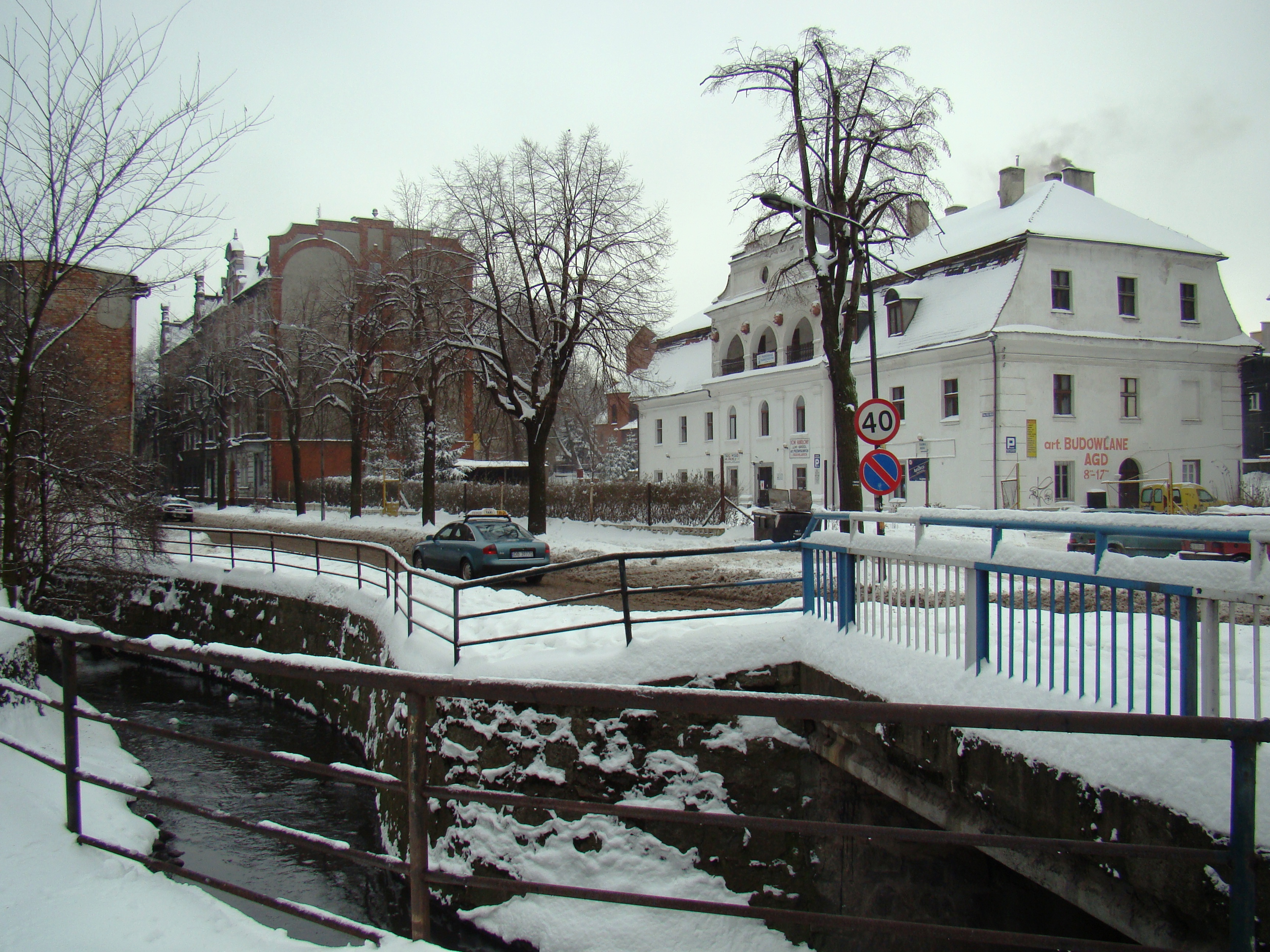
Pełcznica river and the historic Pod Lwami House ("Under the Lions") on the right, in wintertime

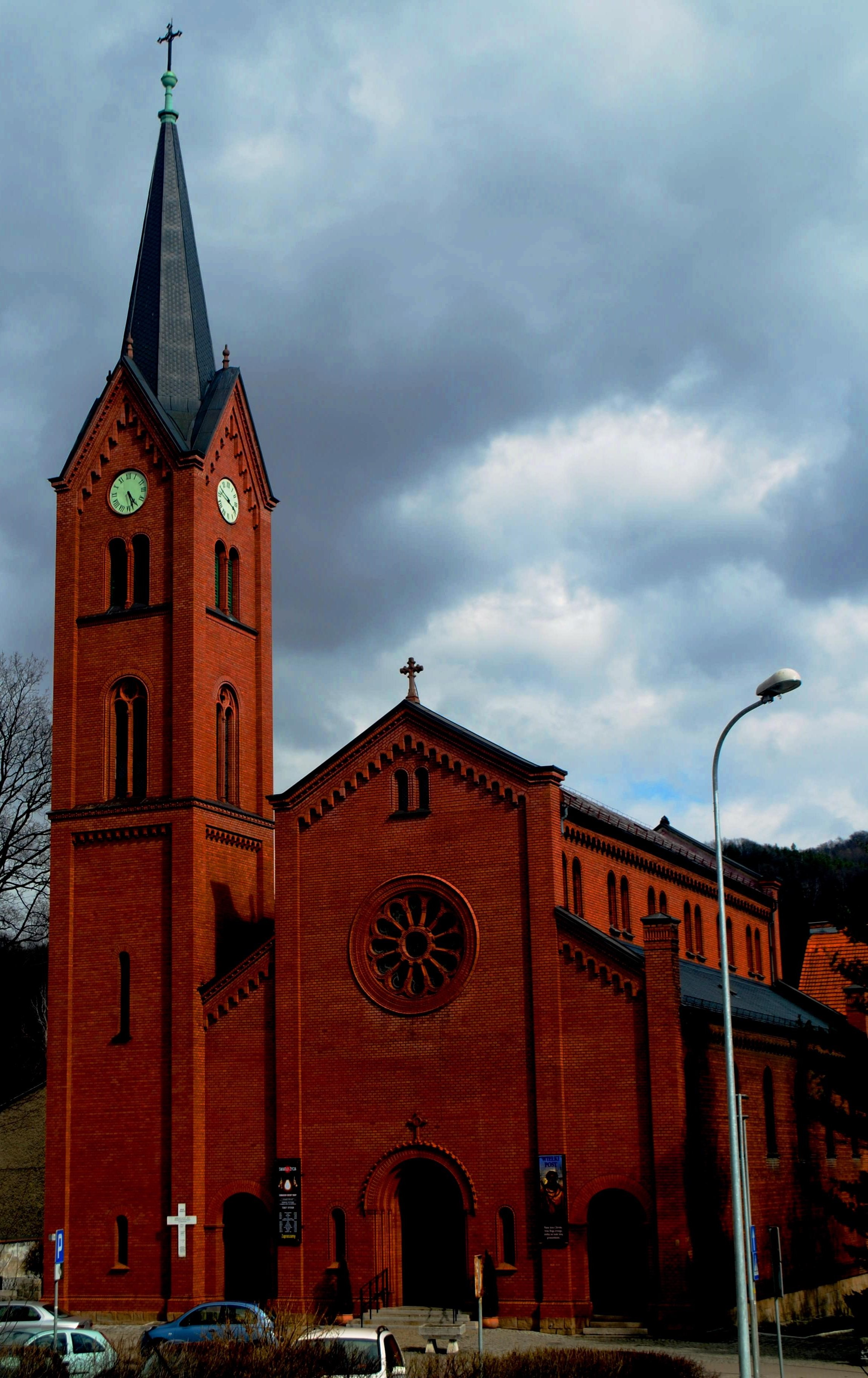
Gothic Revival Church of the Resurrection of Christ

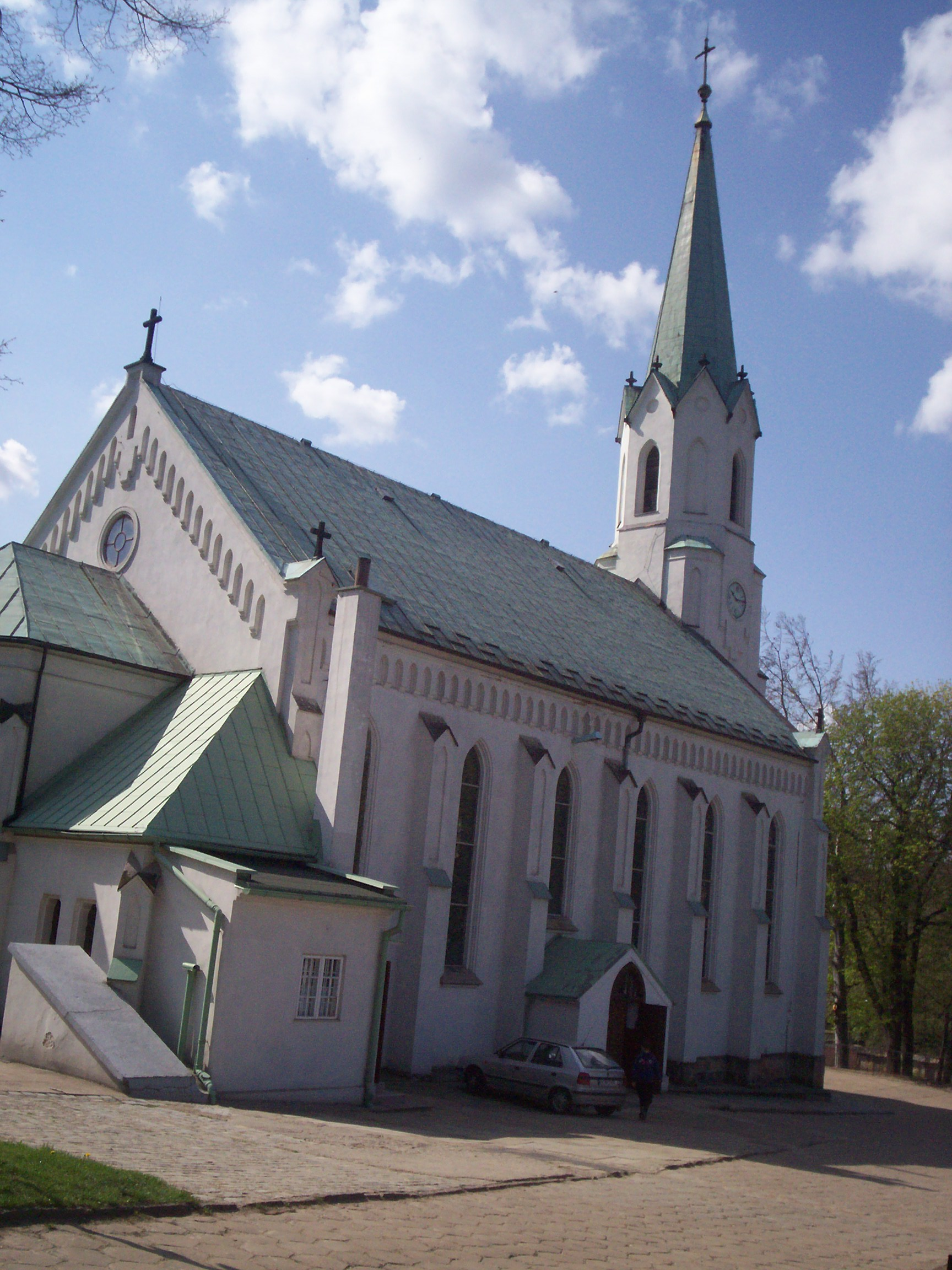
Gothic Revival Church of St. Barbara

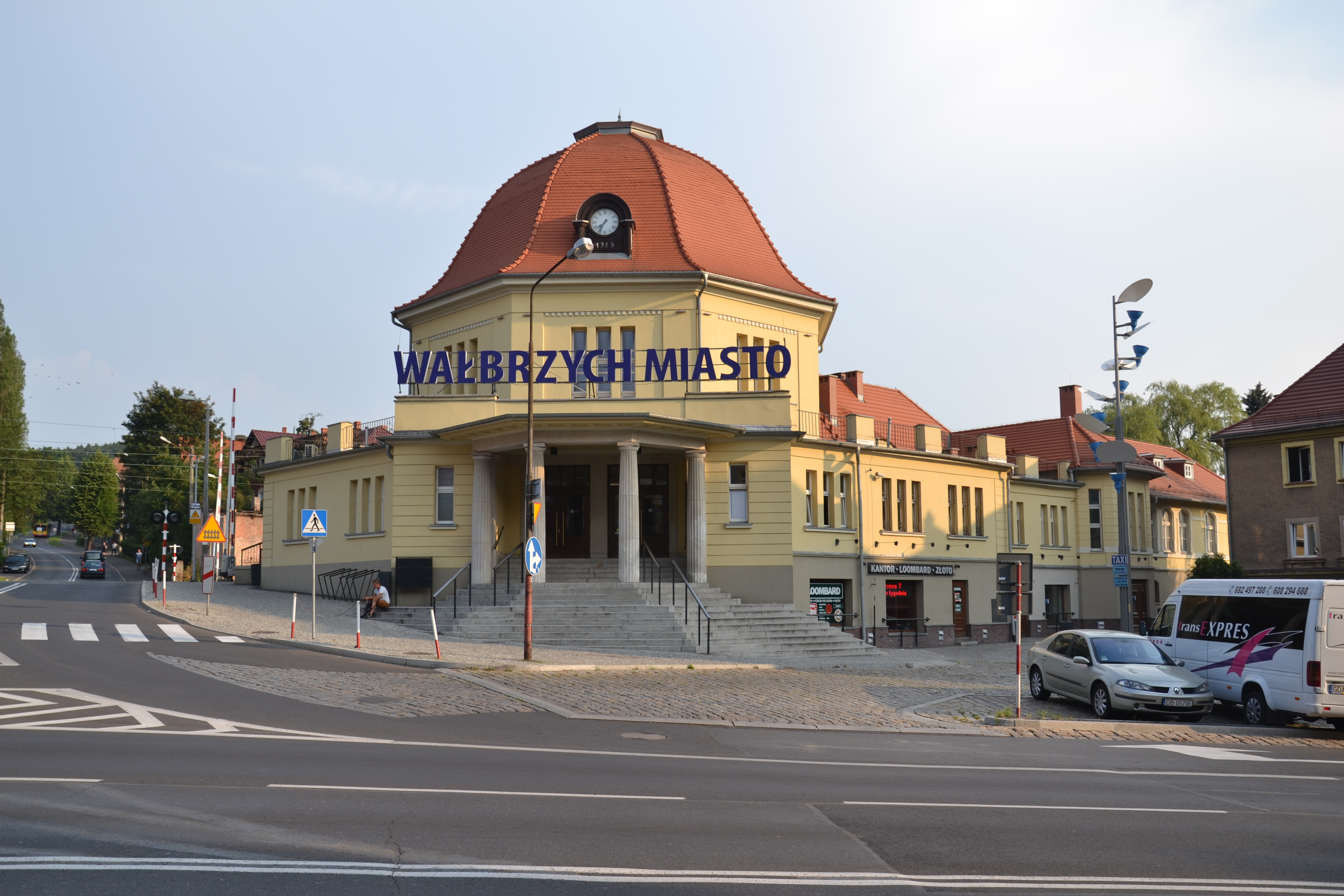
Wałbrzych Miasto train station

== See also ==
- Carl Tielsch & Co.
