= Biały Kamień, Wałbrzych =

Biały Kamień
- City district
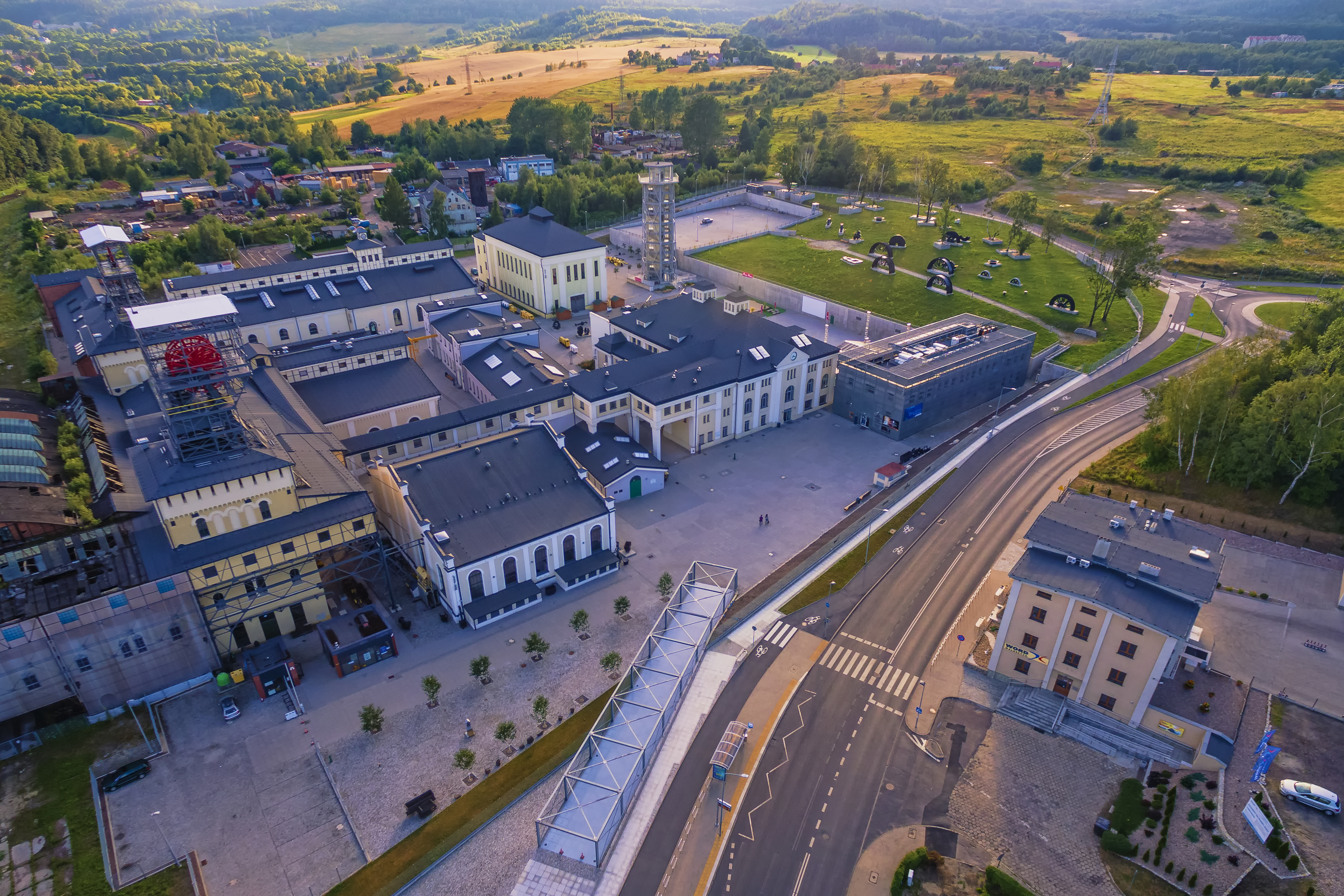
- Interactive map of Biały Kamień
- Coordinates: 50°46′53″N 16°15′14″E
- Country: Poland
- Voivodeship: Lower Silesia
- County: Wałbrzych
- City: Wałbrzych
- First historical mention: 1305
- Incorporated into city: 1951

Population (2014)
  - Total: 14 278
- Time zone: UTC+1 (CET)
  - Summer (DST): UTC+2 (CEST)
- Postal code: 58-304
- Vehicle registration: DB

Biały Kamień (German: Weisstein, Latin: Albus Lapis), formerly an independent city, is a residential district and administrative unit located in the western part of Wałbrzych. It is best known for having the oldest record of coal mining in the Wałbrzych region, dated 1561, and for being the home of the football club Zagłębie Wałbrzych.

== History ==
During World War II, the Germans established and operated a forced labour subcamp of the Stalag VIII-A prisoner-of-war camp at a local coal mine. It was annexed by Wałbrzych in 1951.
