= Bernartice (Jeseník District) =

- Municipality
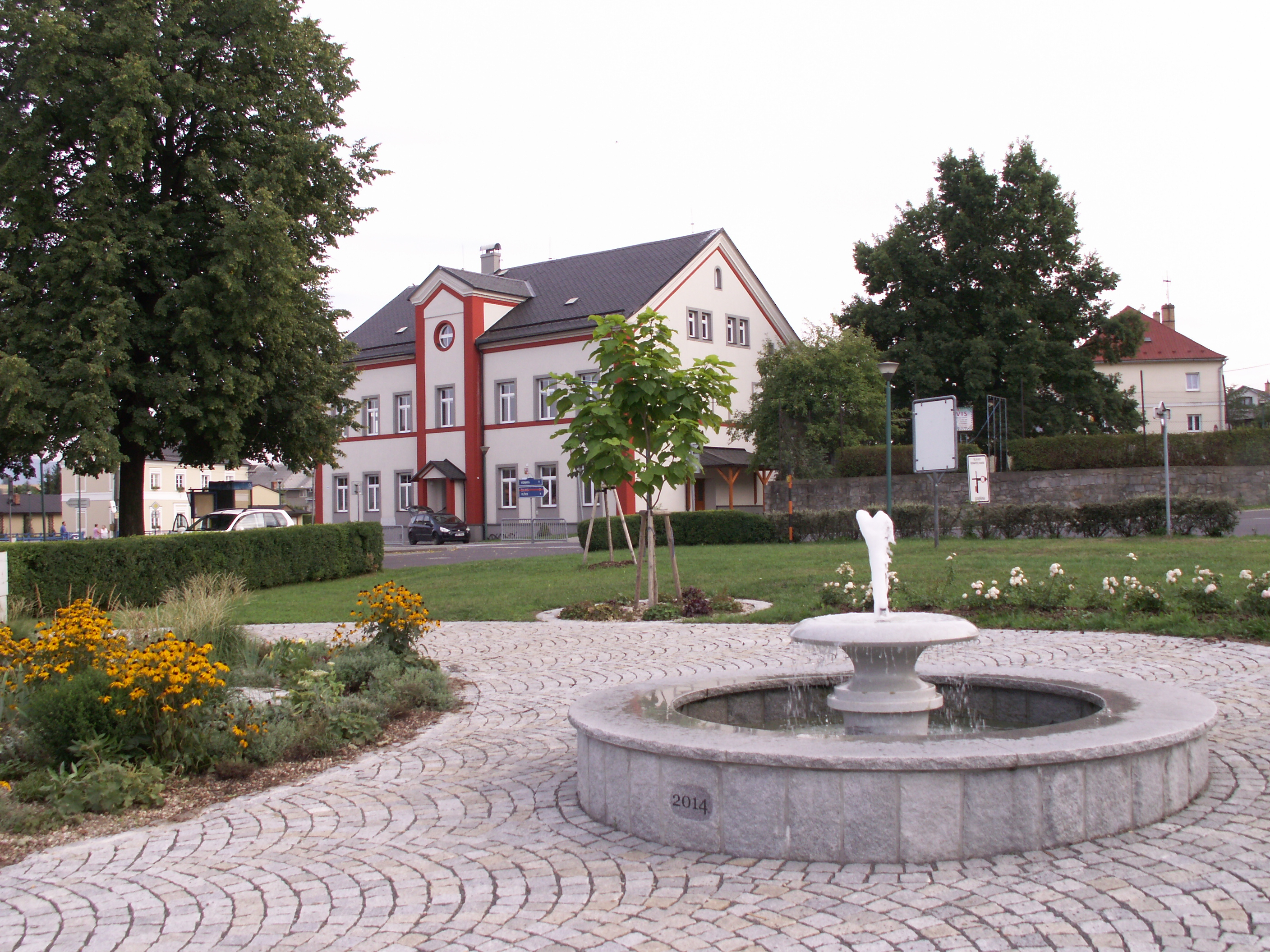
- Centre of Bernartice

- Flag Coat of arms

- Location in the Czech Republic
- Coordinates: 50°23′23″N 17°4′42″E
- Country: Czech Republic
- Region: Olomouc
- District: Jeseník
- First mentioned: 1291

Area
  - Total: 28.55 km^{2} (11.02 sq mi)
- Elevation: 247 m (810 ft)

Population (2026-01-01)
  - Total: 820
  - Density: 29/km^{2} (74/sq mi)
- Time zone: UTC+1 (CET)
  - Summer (DST): UTC+2 (CEST)
- Postal code: 790 57
- Website: bernartice.eu

Bernartice (German: Barzdorf) is a municipality and village in Jeseník District in the Olomouc Region of the Czech Republic. It has about 800 inhabitants.

== Administrative division ==
Bernartice consists of three municipal parts (in brackets population according to the 2021 census):

- Bernartice (675)
- Buková (63)
- Horní Heřmanice (45)

== Geography ==
Bernartice is located about 20 kilometres (12 mi) north of Jeseník and 88 km (55 mi) north of Olomouc, on the border with Poland. It lies on the border between the Vidnava Lowland and Žulová Hilly Land. The highest point is at 376 m (1,234 ft) above sea level. The village of Bernartice is situated along the stream Vojtovický potok.

== History ==
The first written mention of Bernartice is from 1291. It was part of fragmented Piast-ruled Poland. As a result of further fragmentation it soon became part of the Duchy of Nysa, which later on passed under Bohemian suzerainty, and following the duchy's dissolution in 1850, it was incorporated directly into Bohemia. Following World War I, from 1918, it formed part of Czechoslovakia, and from 1938 to 1945 it was occupied by Germany.

During World War II, the Germans operated the E461 forced labour subcamp of the Stalag VIII-B/344 prisoner-of-war camp in the village.

== Demographics ==
Historical population

Year	Pop.	±%
1869	3,057	—
1880	3,368	+10.2%
1890	3,063	−9.1%
1900	2,951	−3.7%
1910	2,810	−4.8%

Year	Pop.	±%
1921	2,623	−6.7%
1930	2,631	+0.3%
1950	1,200	−54.4%
1961	1,188	−1.0%
1970	1,067	−10.2%

Year	Pop.	±%
1980	898	−15.8%
1991	884	−1.6%
2001	911	+3.1%
2011	838	−8.0%
2021	783	−6.6%

Source: Censuses

== Transport ==
Bernartice is located on the railway line Javorník–Lipová-lázně.

== Sights ==
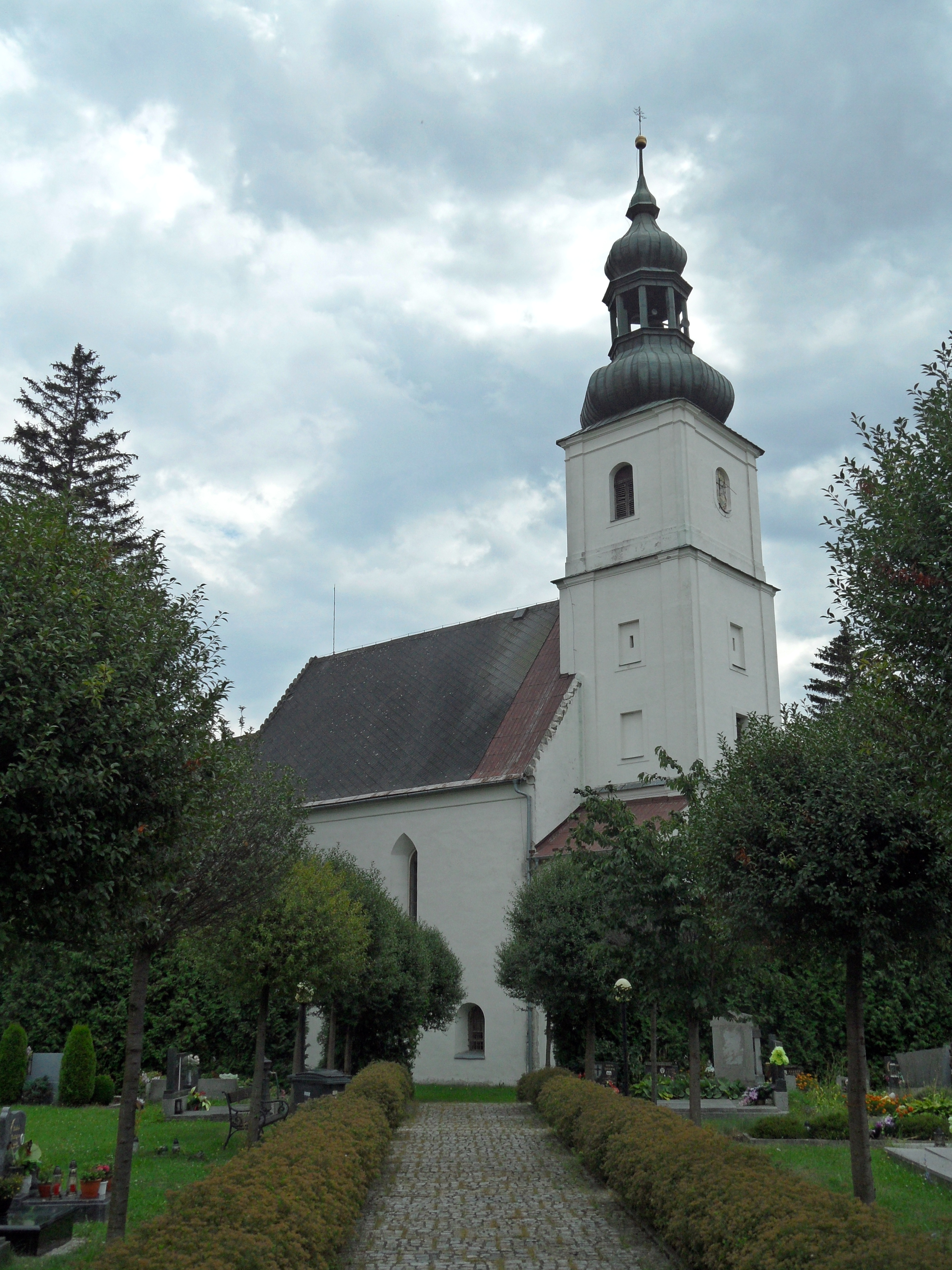
Church of Saints Peter and Paul

The main landmark of Bernartice is the Church of Saints Peter and Paul. It is a Baroque building with a Gothic core.

== Notable people ==
- Josef Jüttner (1775–1848), cartographer and army general
