= Velká Kraš =

- Municipality
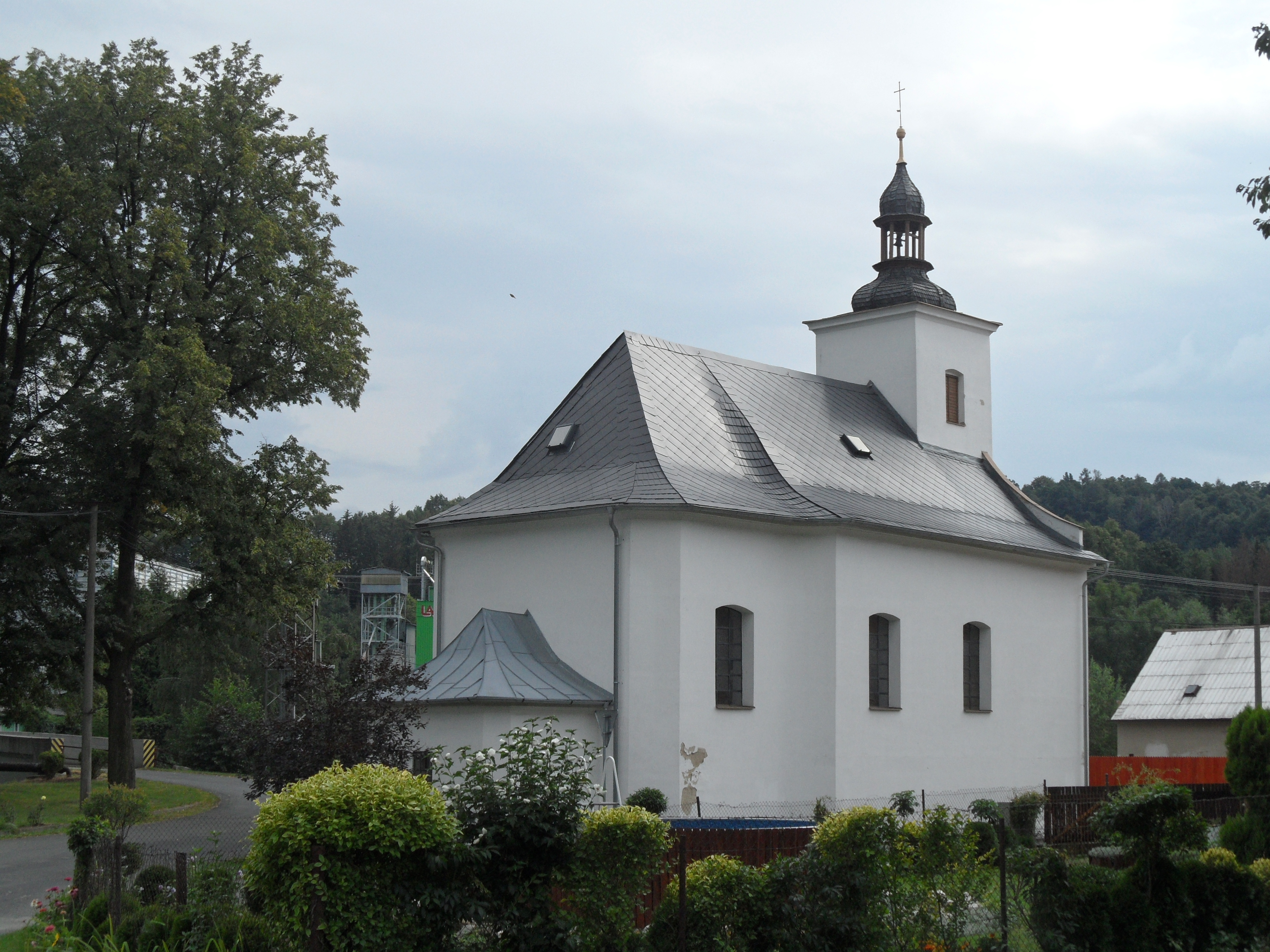
- Church of the Virgin Mary

- Flag Coat of arms

- Location in the Czech Republic
- Coordinates: 50°21′47″N 17°8′47″E
- Country: Czech Republic
- Region: Olomouc
- District: Jeseník
- First mentioned: 1256

Area
  - Total: 21.48 km^{2} (8.29 sq mi)
- Elevation: 252 m (827 ft)

Population (2026-01-01)
  - Total: 725
  - Density: 33.8/km^{2} (87.4/sq mi)
- Time zone: UTC+1 (CET)
  - Summer (DST): UTC+2 (CEST)
- Postal code: 790 58
- Website: www.velkakras.cz

Velká Kraš (German: Groß Krosse) is a municipality and village in Jeseník District in the Olomouc Region of the Czech Republic. It has about 700 inhabitants.

== Geography ==
Velká Kraš is located about 15 kilometres (9 mi) north of Jeseník and 85 km (53 mi) north of Olomouc, on the border with Poland. It lies on the border between the Žulová Hilly Land and Vidnava Lowland. The highest point is the hill Smolný vrch at 404 m (1,325 ft) above sea level. The Vidnávka River flows through the municipality.

== History ==
The first written mention of Velká Kraš is from 1256.

During World War II, the German occupiers operated two forced labour subcamps of the Stalag VIII-B/344 prisoner-of-war camp in the village. Four POWs attempted to escape from one of the subcamps and were killed by the Germans, and then buried in nearby Vidnava.

From 1973 to 1990, Velká Kraš was a municipal part of Vidnava.

== Demographics ==
Historical population

Year	Pop.	±%
1869	1,515	—
1880	1,574	+3.9%
1890	1,621	+3.0%
1900	1,630	+0.6%
1910	1,492	−8.5%

Year	Pop.	±%
1921	1,573	+5.4%
1930	1,643	+4.5%
1950	956	−41.8%
1961	1,049	+9.7%
1970	952	−9.2%

Year	Pop.	±%
1980	853	−10.4%
1991	776	−9.0%
2001	907	+16.9%
2011	733	−19.2%
2021	677	−7.6%

Source: Censuses

== Transport ==
Velká Kraš is located on the railway line Javorník–Lipová-lázně.

== Sights ==
The most valuable monument is the Church of Saint Florian. It was built in the Neoclassical style. The construction was finished in 1799. The second church in Velká Kraš is the Church of the Virgin Mary, which dates from the beginning of the 19th century.

== Twin towns – sister cities ==
Velká Kraš is twinned with:

- Neuburg an der Donau, Germany
