= Jeseník District =

Jeseník District Okres Jeseník
- District
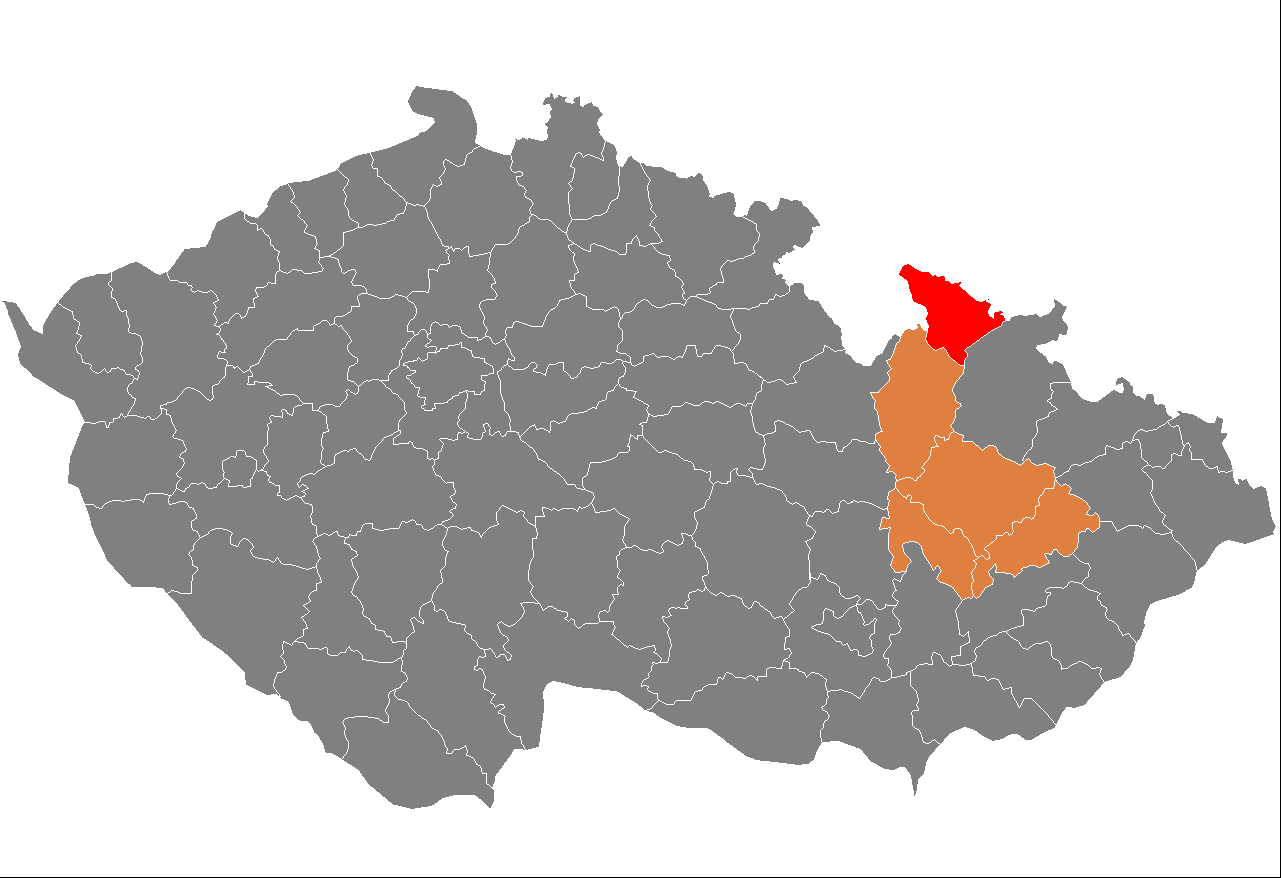
- Location in the Olomouc Region within the Czech Republic
- Coordinates: 50°15′N 17°10′E
- Country: Czech Republic
- Region: Olomouc
- Capital: Jeseník

Area
  - Total: 719.03 km^{2} (277.62 sq mi)

Population (2026)
  - Total: 36,386
  - Density: 50.604/km^{2} (131.06/sq mi)
- Time zone: UTC+1 (CET)
  - Summer (DST): UTC+2 (CEST)
- Municipalities: 24
- * Towns: 5
- * Market towns: 0

Jeseník District (Czech: okres Jeseník) is a district in the Olomouc Region of the Czech Republic. Its capital is the town of Jeseník. With approximately 36,000 inhabitants, it is the least populated district of the Czech Republic.

== Administrative division ==
Jeseník District is formed by only one administrative district of municipality with extended competence: Jeseník.

=== List of municipalities ===
Towns are marked in bold:

Bělá pod Pradědem – Bernartice – Bílá Voda – Černá Voda – Česká Ves – Hradec-Nová Ves – Javorník – Jeseník – Kobylá nad Vidnavkou – Lipová-lázně – Mikulovice – Ostružná – Písečná – Skorošice – Stará Červená Voda – Supíkovice – Uhelná – Vápenná – Velká Kraš – Velké Kunětice – Vidnava – Vlčice – Zlaté Hory – Žulová

== Geography ==
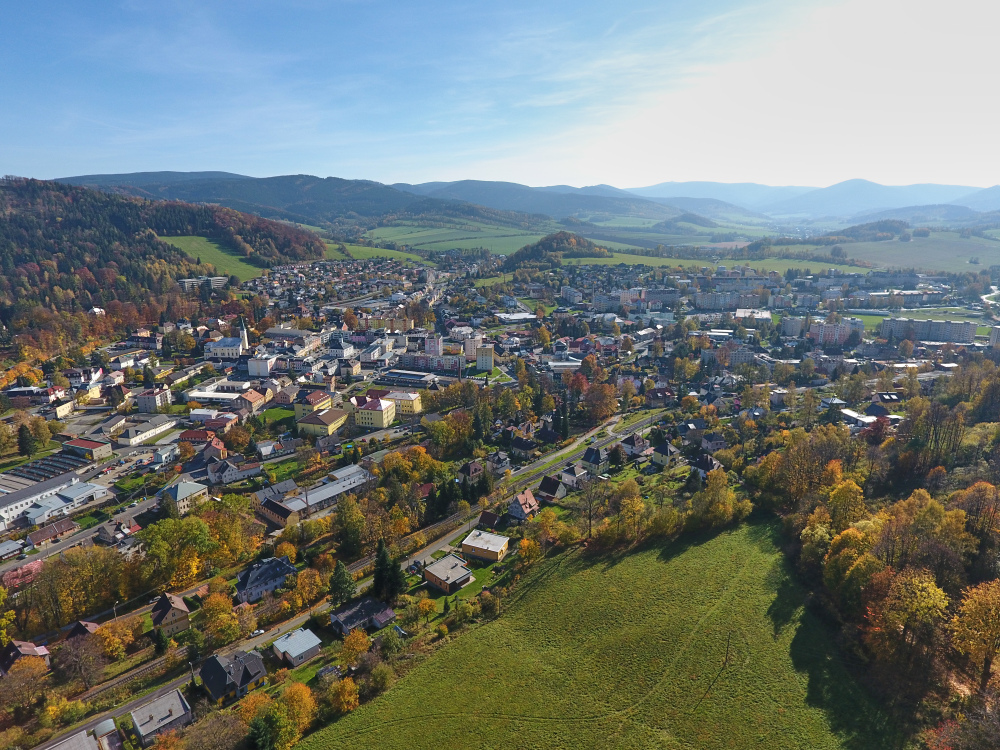
Jeseník and surrounding landscape

Jeseník District borders Poland in the north and west. Most of the district belongs to the territory of the historical land of Czech Silesia, but in the southwest it also extends into the territory of Moravia. The landscape is very diverse and rugged. Most of the territory is hilly; in the south it is mountainous, and in the north it turns into plains. The territory extends into five geomorphological mesoregions: Golden Mountains (west and centre), Hrubý Jeseník (south), Vidnava Lowland (northwest), Žulová Hilly Land (north), and Zlatohorská Highlands (east). The highest point of the district is the Keprník mountain in Ostružná with an elevation of 1,423 m (4,669 ft), the lowest point is the river bed of the Vidnavka in Velká Kraš at 220 m (720 ft).

From the total district area of 719.0 km^{2} (277.6 sq mi), agricultural land occupies 234.0 km^{2} (90.3 sq mi), forests occupy 430.0 km^{2} (166.0 sq mi), and water area occupies 7.8 km^{2} (3.0 sq mi). Forests cover 59.8% of the district's area, which makes it the most forested district of the country.

There are no significant rivers and bodies of water. The most important rivers are the Bělá and Vidnavka. Both are tributaries of the Eastern Neisse, which originate here and flow across the district from south to north. Notable is also the Černá Opava, a stream that originates here and is one of the sources of the Opava River. The largest body of water is the Velký Pond with an area of 11 ha (27 acres).

A large part of the Jeseníky Protected Landscape Area extends into the district in the south.

== History ==
Jeseník District is the youngest district of the Czech Republic. It was created on 1 January 1996 by separation from Šumperk District and is thus the only district created after 1960.

== Demographics ==
As of 2026, Jeseník District is the least populous district in the country.

Historical population

Year	Pop.	±%
1869	63,916	—
1880	67,275	+5.3%
1890	68,016	+1.1%
1900	67,346	−1.0%
1910	67,249	−0.1%

Year	Pop.	±%
1921	64,594	−3.9%
1930	70,092	+8.5%
1950	37,881	−46.0%
1961	40,195	+6.1%
1970	39,709	−1.2%

Year	Pop.	±%
1980	42,238	+6.4%
1991	42,583	+0.8%
2001	42,413	−0.4%
2011	38,779	−8.6%
2021	35,471	−8.5%

Source: Censuses

=== Most populous municipalities ===
Name	Population	Area (km^{2})
Jeseník	10,324	38
Zlaté Hory	3,933	86
Javorník	2,544	77
Mikulovice	2,462	33
Česká Ves	2,258	25
Lipová-lázně	2,020	44
Bělá pod Pradědem	1,701	92
Vidnava	1,192	4
Vápenná	1,161	37
Žulová	1,119	15

== Economy ==
The largest employers with headquarters in Jeseník District and at least 250 employees are:

Economic entity	Location	Number of employees	Main activity
CS-CONT	Zlaté Hory	500–999	Manufacture of containers
Zemědělské družstvo "Agroholding"	Bernartice	250–499	Animal production
AGEL Jeseník Hospital	Jeseník	250–499	Health care
Priessnitzovy léčebné lázně	Jeseník	250–499	Health care
Town of Jeseník	Jeseník	250–499	Public administration

== Transport ==
There are no motorways passing through the district. The most important road is the I/44 road from Šumperk to the Czech–Polish border.

== Sights ==
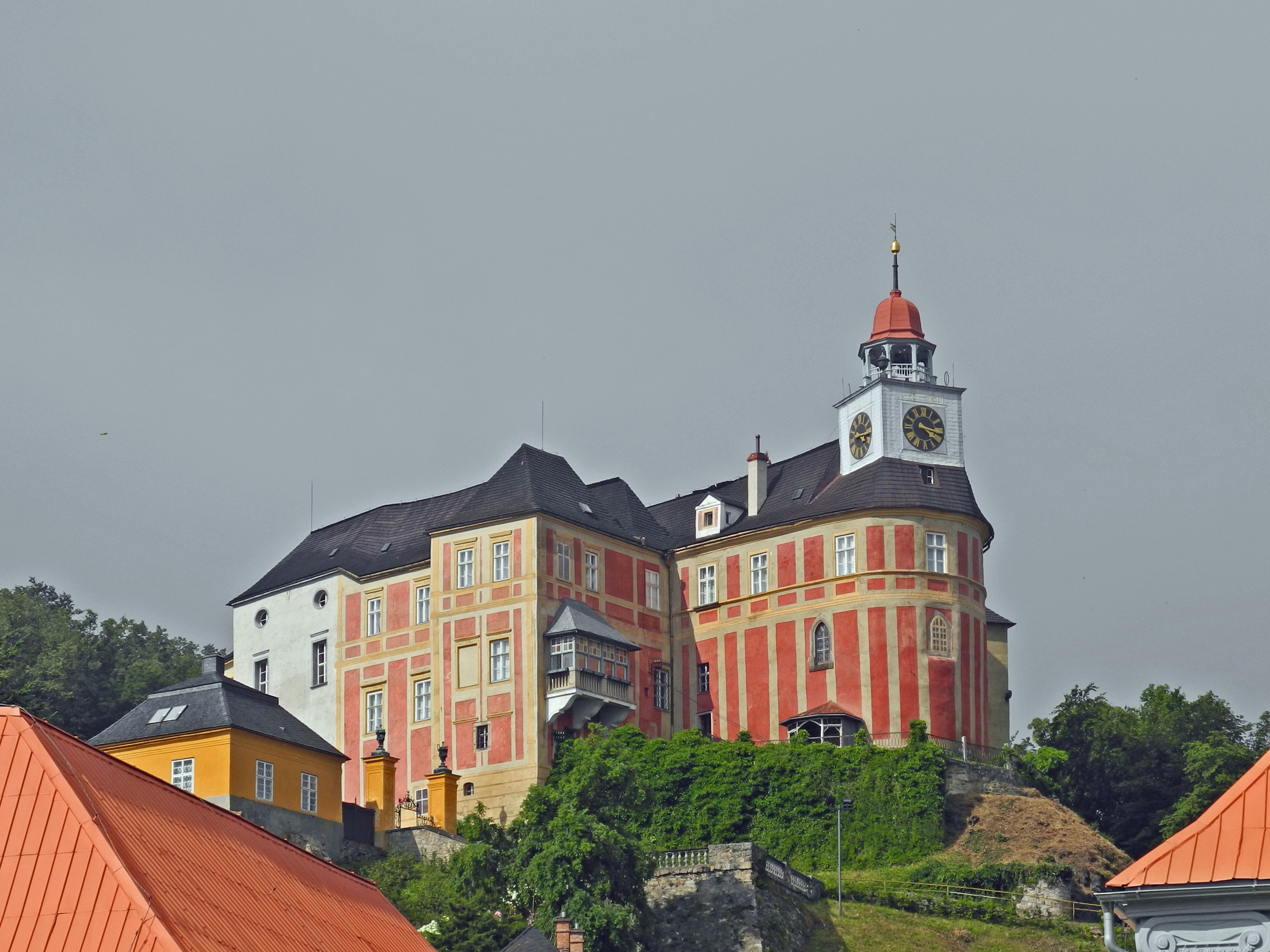
Jánský Vrch Castle

The most important monument in the district and the only one protected as a national cultural monument is Jánský Vrch Castle.

The best-preserved settlements, protected as monument zones, are:

- Javorník
- Vidnava
- Zlaté Hory
- Rejvíz
- Údolí (Horní Údolí and Dolní Údolí)

The most visited tourist destinations are the Rejvíz educational trail in Rejvíz and Rychlebské bike trails in Černá Voda.
