= Žulová =

- Town
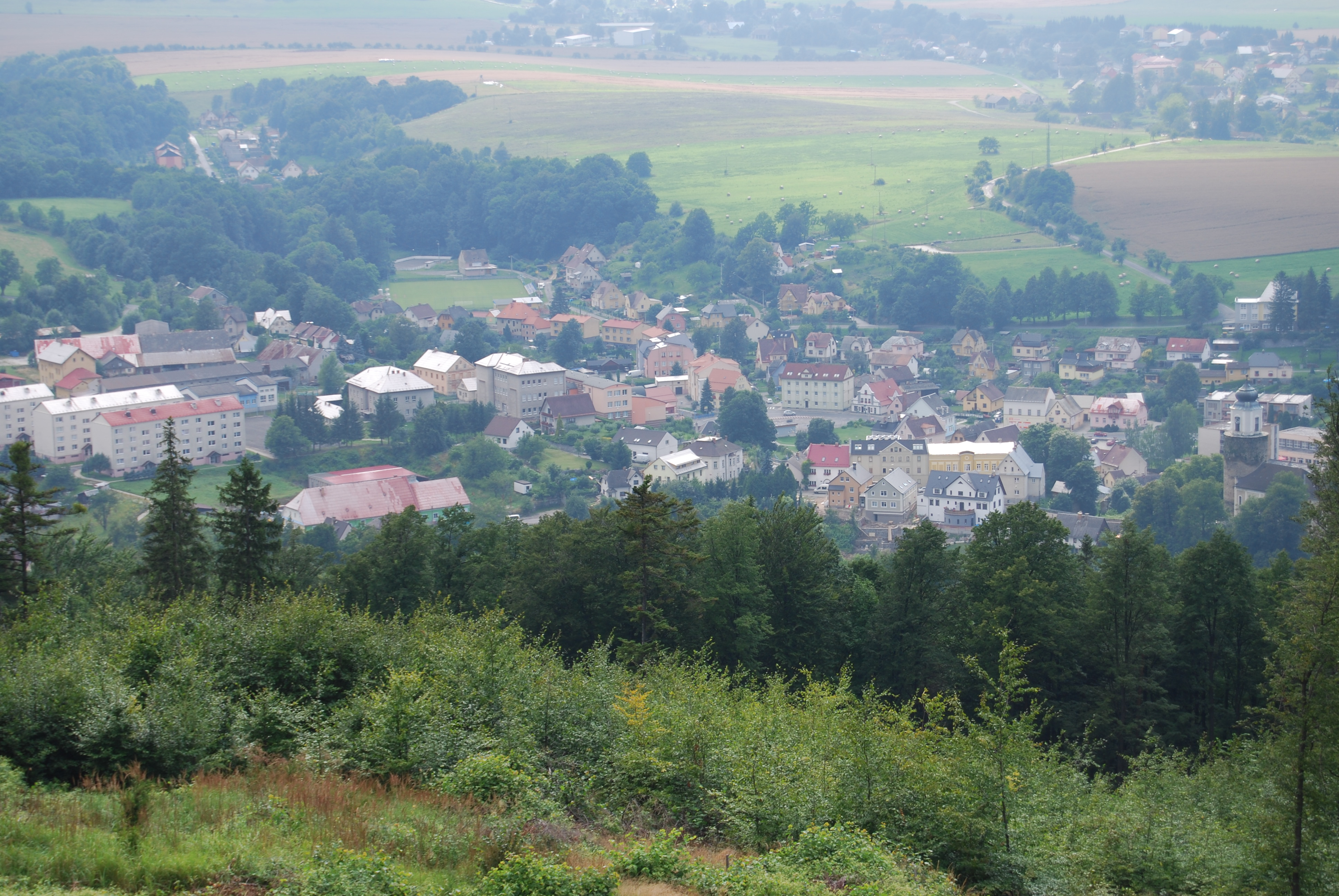
- View of Žulová from Boží hora

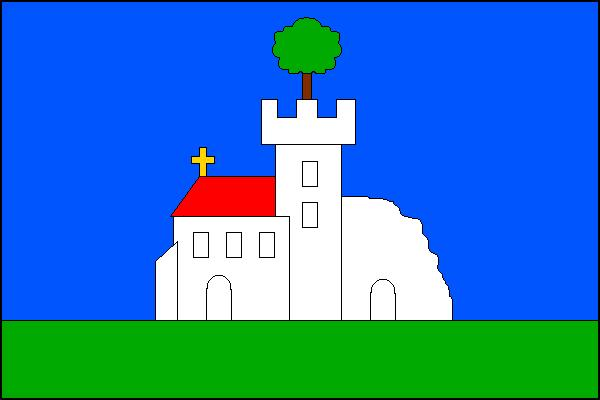
- Flag Coat of arms

- Location in the Czech Republic
- Coordinates: 50°18′34″N 17°5′56″E
- Country: Czech Republic
- Region: Olomouc
- District: Jeseník
- First mentioned: 1266

Area
  - Total: 14.76 km^{2} (5.70 sq mi)
- Elevation: 357 m (1,171 ft)

Population (2026-01-01)
  - Total: 1,119
  - Density: 75.81/km^{2} (196.4/sq mi)
- Time zone: UTC+1 (CET)
  - Summer (DST): UTC+2 (CEST)
- Postal code: 790 65
- Website: www.mestozulova.cz

Žulová (Czech pronunciation: [ˈʒulovaː]; until 1948 Frýdberk; German: Friedeberg) is a town in Jeseník District in the Olomouc Region of the Czech Republic. It has about 1,100 inhabitants.

== Administrative division ==
Žulová consists of two municipal parts (in brackets population according to the 2021 census):

- Žulová (938)
- Tomíkovice (163)

== Etymology ==
The name is derived from the Czech word for granite (žula), which was mined here.

== Geography ==
Žulová is located about 11 kilometres (7 mi) north-west of Jeseník and 80 km (50 mi) north of Olomouc. It lies in the Žulová Hilly Land. The highest point is the hill Boží hora at 527 m (1,729 ft) above sea level. The Vidnávka River flows through the town.

The fishpond Velký rybník is located in the eastern part of the municipal territory. With an area of 11 ha (27 acres), it is the largest pond in the area.

== History ==
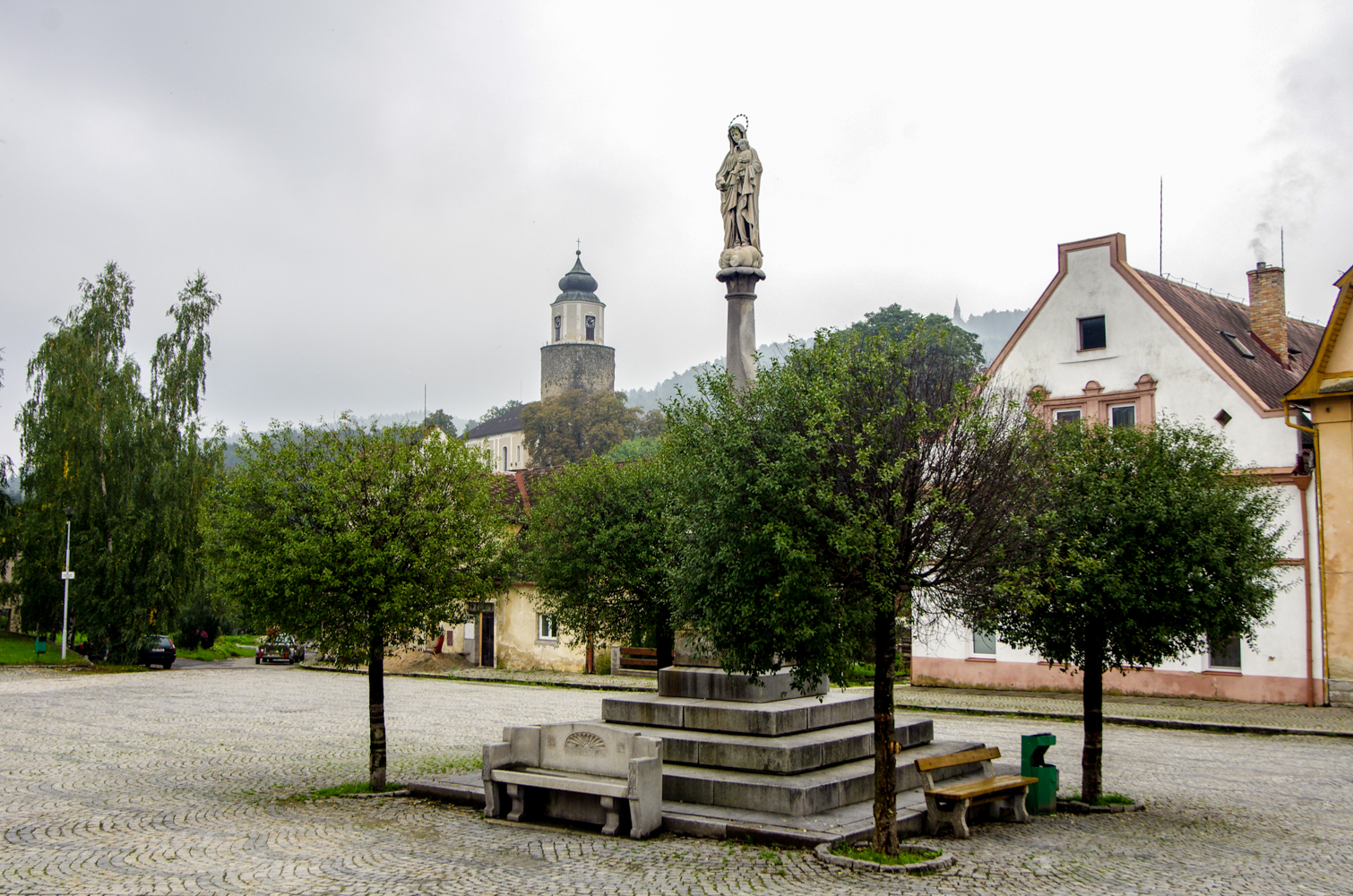
The square Mariánské náměstí

The first written mention of Frýdberk is from the 13th century, when the Frýdberk Castle was built. The settlement was first referred to as a town in 1358. It was part of the Duchy of Nysa under Bohemian suzerainty. In the 15th century, silver was mined here and two glassworks were in operation. The castle was renaissance reconstructed in 1594.

The development of the town ended with the Thirty Years' War. In 1639, the castle was conquered and demolished by the Swedish and Polish troops. The town was looted in 1642 and destroyed by a fire in 1657. In the second half of the 17th century, Frýdberk recovered and began to expand. In 1793, the town privileges were restored.

Following the duchy's dissolution in 1850, it was incorporated directly into Bohemia. In the 19th century, the town of became a centre of stone mining and processing, especially granite.

From 1938 to 1945, the town was occupied by Nazi Germany and administered as part of the Reichsgau Sudetenland. During World War II, the German administration operated a forced labour subcamp of the Stalag VIII-B/344 prisoner-of-war camp at a quarry in Frýdberk, and a subcamp of Stalag VIII-B/344 at a quarry in Tomíkovice.

In 1948, the municipality was renamed to its current name.

== Demographics ==
Historical population

Year	Pop.	±%
1869	1,606	—
1880	1,698	+5.7%
1890	1,658	−2.4%
1900	1,790	+8.0%
1910	1,843	+3.0%

Year	Pop.	±%
1921	1,883	+2.2%
1930	2,172	+15.3%
1950	1,241	−42.9%
1961	1,349	+8.7%
1970	1,373	+1.8%

Year	Pop.	±%
1980	1,437	+4.7%
1991	1,333	−7.2%
2001	1,370	+2.8%
2011	1,242	−9.3%
2021	1,101	−11.4%

Source: Censuses

== Transport ==
Žulová is located on a railway line of local importance from Javorník to Lipová-lázně.

== Sights ==
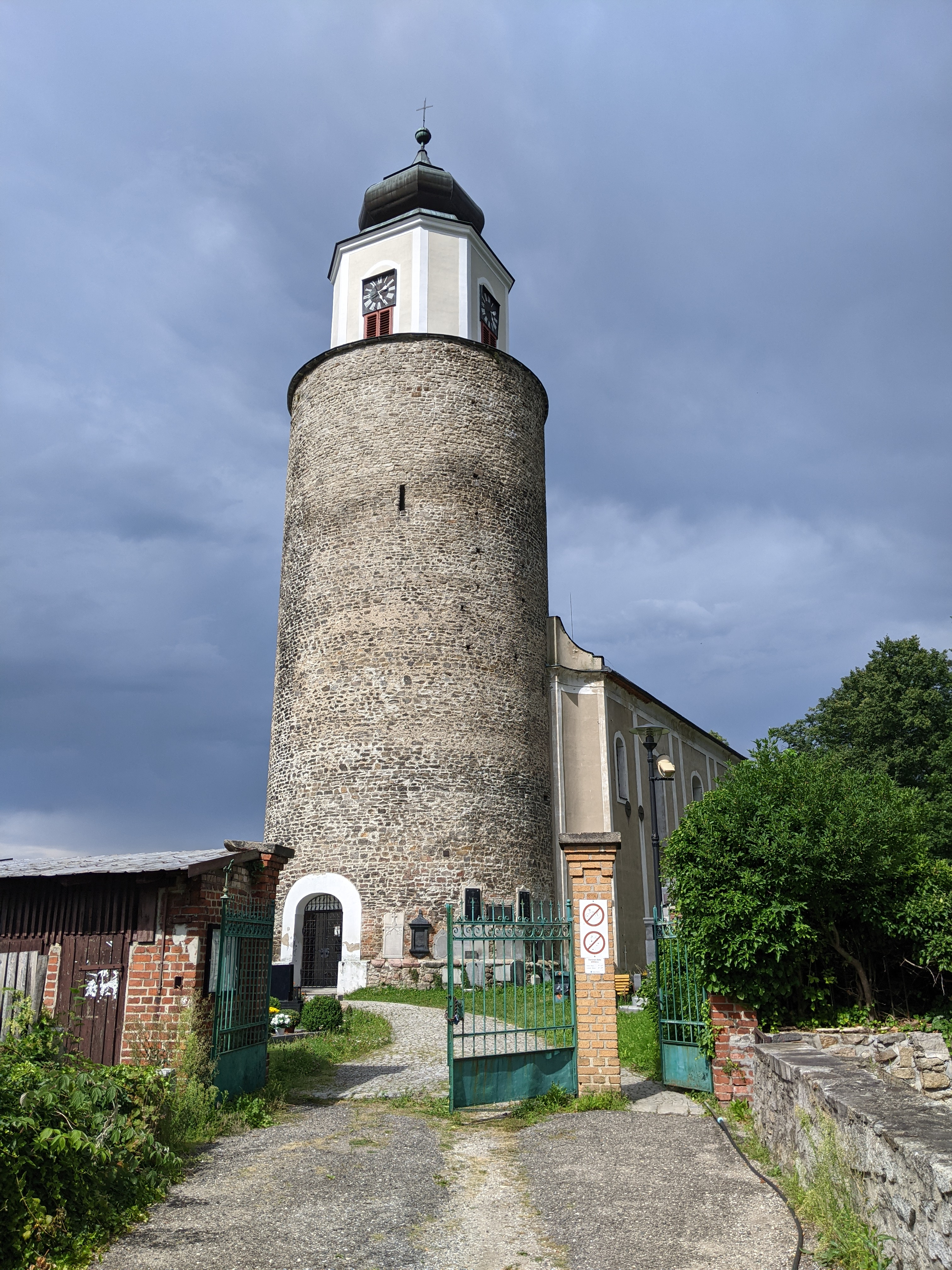
Church of Saint Joseph

A bergfried survived from the ruins of the castle. It is up to 4 m (13 ft) thick and has survived to the present day up to the height of the original 4th floor. The bergfried and the core of the castle ruins were used to build a unique church. The Church of Saint Joseph was built in the Neoclassical style in 1809–1810. The stone bridge leading to the church was built in 1846 and is also a cultural monument.

The Church of Our Lady of Sorrows is situated on the hill Boží hora. A wooden church, which was built there in 1712–1713, was replaced by the current neo-Gothic building in 1878–1880. It was designed by Friedrich von Schmidt. An atypical double construction system was used during construction due to the local extreme weather conditions. The Stations of the Cross line the way up the hill to the church.

== Gallery ==
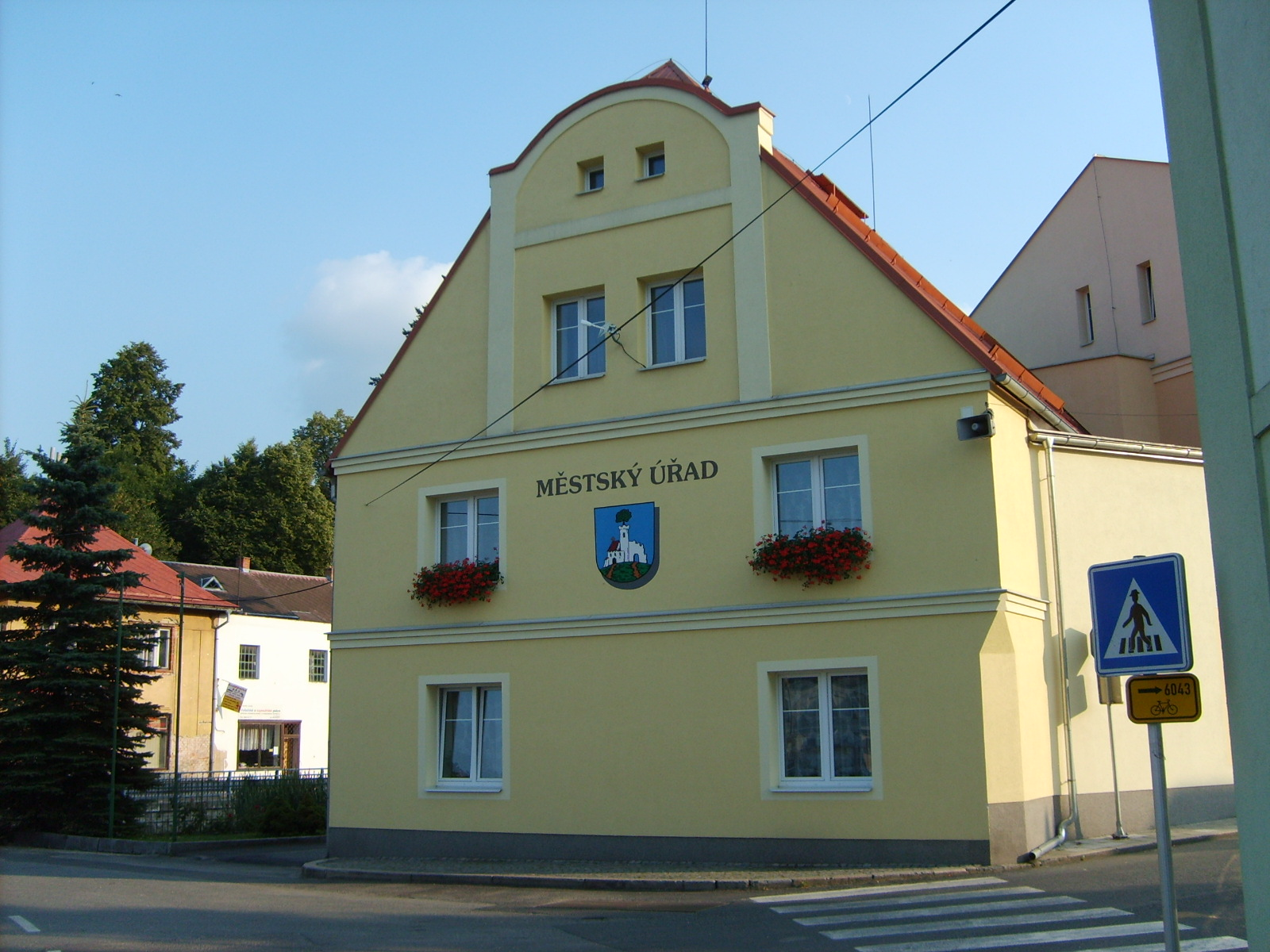
Town hall

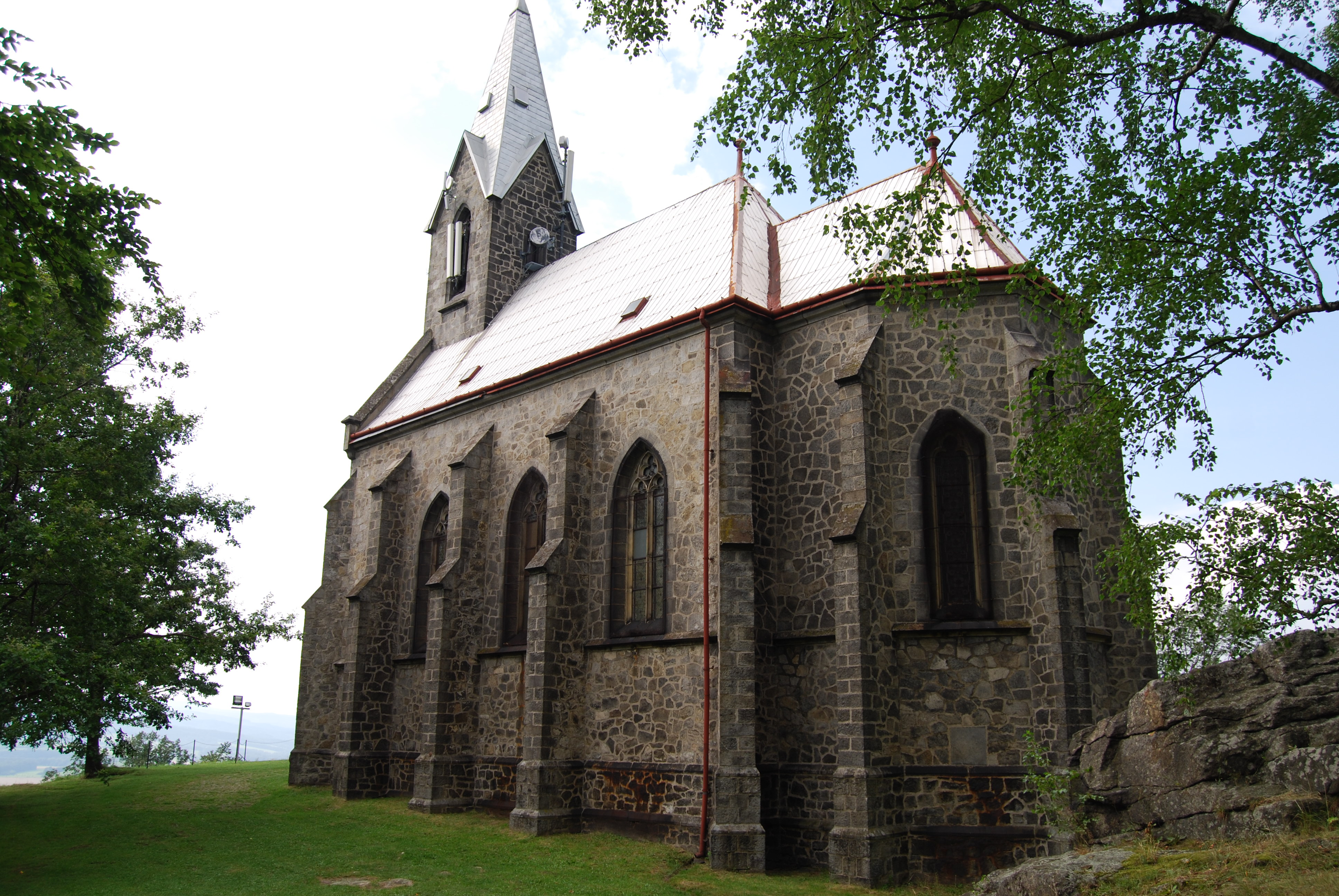
Church of Our Lady of Sorrows
