= Vápenná =

- Municipality
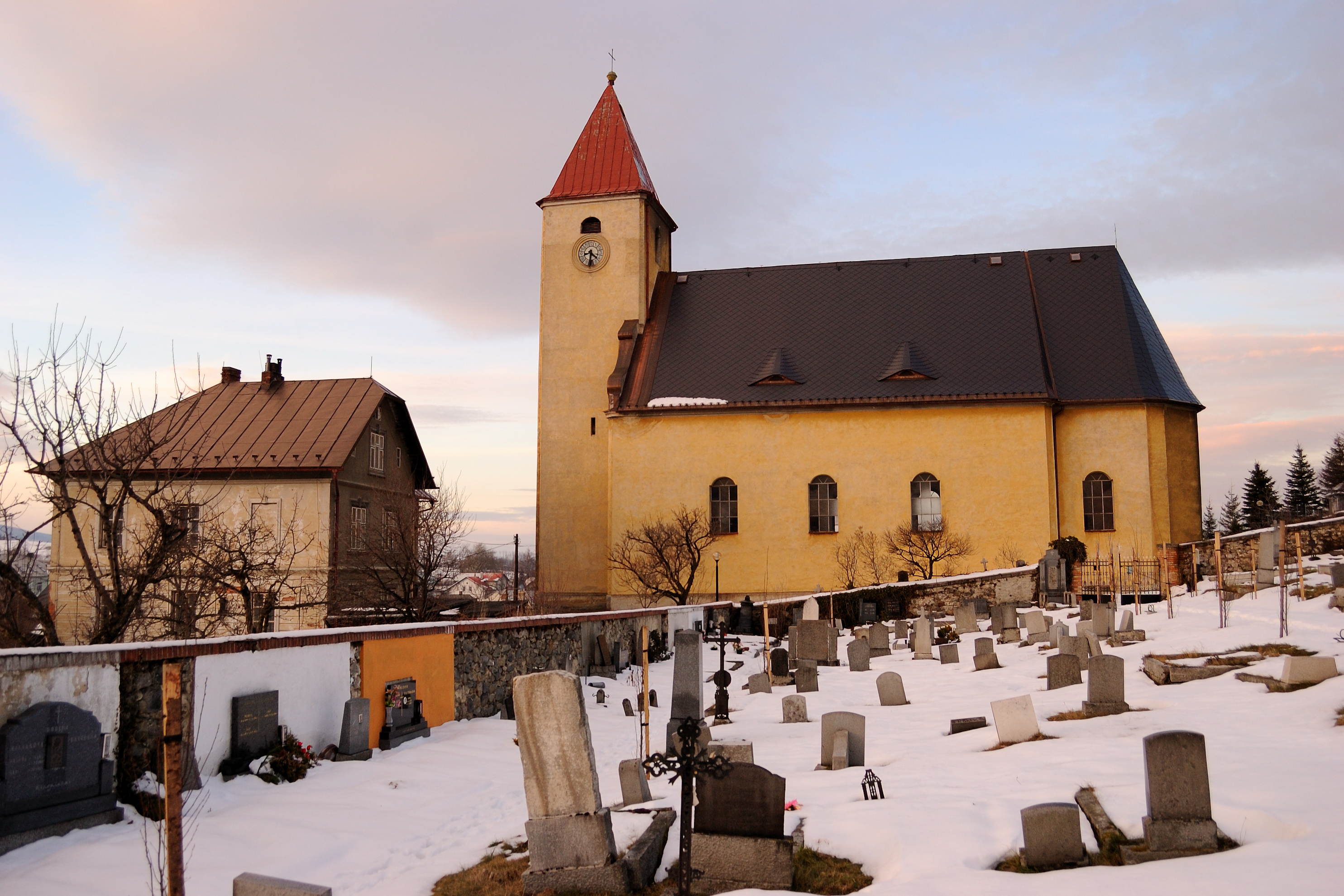
- Church of Saint Philip

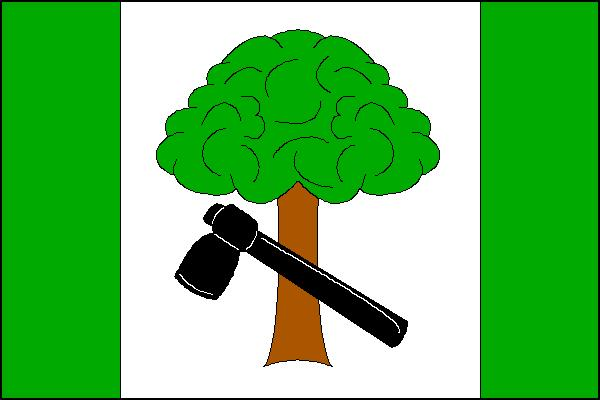
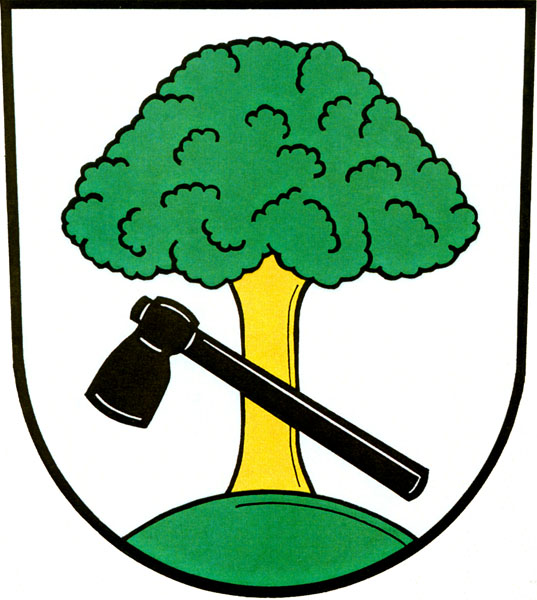
- Flag Coat of arms

- Location in the Czech Republic
- Coordinates: 50°17′0″N 17°5′52″E
- Country: Czech Republic
- Region: Olomouc
- District: Jeseník
- First mentioned: 1358

Area
  - Total: 36.79 km^{2} (14.20 sq mi)
- Elevation: 408 m (1,339 ft)

Population (2026-01-01)
  - Total: 1,161
  - Density: 31.56/km^{2} (81.73/sq mi)
- Time zone: UTC+1 (CET)
  - Summer (DST): UTC+2 (CEST)
- Postal code: 790 64
- Website: www.vapenna.cz

Vápenná (until 1949 Zighartice; German: Setzdorf) is a municipality and village in Jeseník District in the Olomouc Region of the Czech Republic. It has about 1,200 inhabitants.

== Administrative division ==
Vápenná consists of two municipal parts (in brackets population according to the 2021 census):

- Vápenná (1,114)
- Polka (21)

== Geography ==
Vápenná is located about 10 kilometres (6 mi) northwest of Jeseník and 77 km (48 mi) north of Olomouc. The larger part of the municipal territory lies in the Golden Mountains, only a small part extends lies into the Žulová Hilly Land in the north. The highest point is the mountain Studený at 1,042 m (3,419 ft) above sea level. The built-up area is situated in the valley of the Vidnávka River.

== History ==
The first written mention of Zighartice is from 1358. The village was abandoned in around 1420, but was resettled in 1576.

During the World War II, the German occupiers operated four forced labour subcamps of the Stalag VIII-B/344 prisoner-of-war camp at the local quarries.

In 1949, the municipality was renamed Vápenná.

== Demographics ==
Historical population

| Year | Pop. | ±% |
|---|---|---|
| 1869 | 2,058 | — |
| 1880 | 2,216 | +7.7% |
| 1890 | 2,284 | +3.1% |
| 1900 | 2,516 | +10.2% |
| 1910 | 2,599 | +3.3% |

| Year | Pop. | ±% |
|---|---|---|
| 1921 | 2,475 | −4.8% |
| 1930 | 2,936 | +18.6% |
| 1950 | 1,135 | −61.3% |
| 1961 | 1,311 | +15.5% |
| 1970 | 1,278 | −2.5% |

| Year | Pop. | ±% |
|---|---|---|
| 1980 | 1,338 | +4.7% |
| 1991 | 1,358 | +1.5% |
| 2001 | 1,272 | −6.3% |
| 2011 | 1,219 | −4.2% |
| 2021 | 1,135 | −6.9% |

Source: Censuses

== Transport ==
The I/60 road from Jeseník to the Czech–Polish border runs through the town. On the border is the Bílý potok / Paczków road border crossing.

Vápenná is located on the railway line of local importance Javorník–Lipová-lázně.

== Sights ==
The main landmark of Vápenná is the Church of Saint Philip. It was built in the Neoclassical style in 1780–1781.

== Notable people ==
- Emil Beier (1893–1985), Nazi German politician
