= Stará Červená Voda =

- Municipality
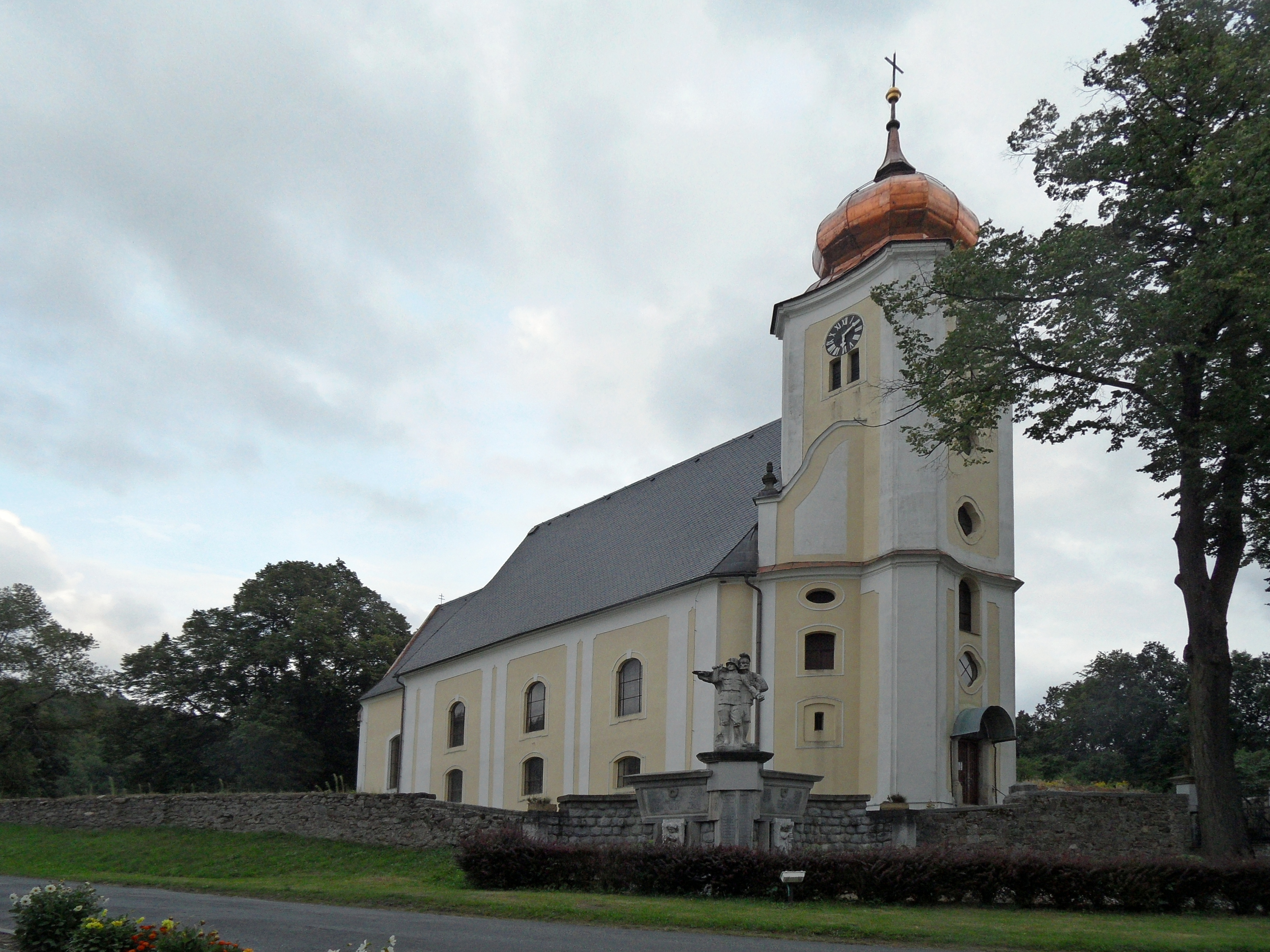
- Church of Corpus Christi

- Flag Coat of arms

- Location in the Czech Republic
- Coordinates: 50°19′46″N 17°12′4″E
- Country: Czech Republic
- Region: Olomouc
- District: Jeseník
- First mentioned: 1266

Area
  - Total: 36.62 km^{2} (14.14 sq mi)
- Elevation: 304 m (997 ft)

Population (2026-01-01)
  - Total: 590
  - Density: 16/km^{2} (42/sq mi)
- Time zone: UTC+1 (CET)
  - Summer (DST): UTC+2 (CEST)
- Postal code: 790 53
- Website: staracervenavoda.cz

Stará Červená Voda (German: Alt Rothwasser) is a municipality and village in Jeseník District in the Olomouc Region of the Czech Republic. It has about 600 inhabitants.

== Administrative division ==
Stará Červená Voda consists of two municipal parts (in brackets population according to the 2021 census):

- Stará Červená Voda (369)
- Nová Červená Voda (191)

== Geography ==
Stará Červená Voda is located about 11 kilometres (7 mi) north of Jeseník and 81 km (50 mi) north of Olomouc, on the border with Poland. The northern part of the municipality with the built-up area lies in the Žulová Hilly Land. The southern forested part belongs to the Golden Mountains. The highest point is the mountain Sokolí vrch at 967 m (3,173 ft) above sea level.

== History ==
The first written mention of Stará Červená Voda is in a deed from 1291, which described the situation in 1266. It was then part of the Duchy of Nysa within fragmented Piast-ruled Poland. Later on, along with the Duchy of Nysa, it passed under Bohemian suzerainty, and following the duchy's dissolution in 1850, it was incorporated directly into Bohemia. Following World War I, from 1918, it formed part of Czechoslovakia.

From 1938 to 1945, the municipality was occupied by Germany. It was the base for a German-operated working party (E433) of British and Commonwealth prisoners of war, under the administration of the Stalag VIII-B/344 prisoner-of-war camp at Łambinowice.

== Demographics ==
Historical population

Year	Pop.	±%
1869	2,235	—
1880	2,336	+4.5%
1890	2,328	−0.3%
1900	2,108	−9.5%
1910	2,135	+1.3%

Year	Pop.	±%
1921	1,992	−6.7%
1930	2,101	+5.5%
1950	958	−54.4%
1961	922	−3.8%
1970	794	−13.9%

Year	Pop.	±%
1980	723	−8.9%
1991	681	−5.8%
2001	654	−4.0%
2011	663	+1.4%
2021	560	−15.5%

Source: Censuses

== Transport ==
There are no railways or major roads passing through the municipality. On the Czech–Polish border is the road border crossing Stará Červená Voda / Jarnołtów.

== Sights ==
The main landmark of Stará Červená Voda is the Church of Corpus Cristi. It has an early Gothic core, which makes it one of the oldest churches in the region. It was rebuilt in the Baroque style in 1755–1756. The presbytery is decorated by frescoes from around 1510.
