= Hradec-Nová Ves =

- Municipality
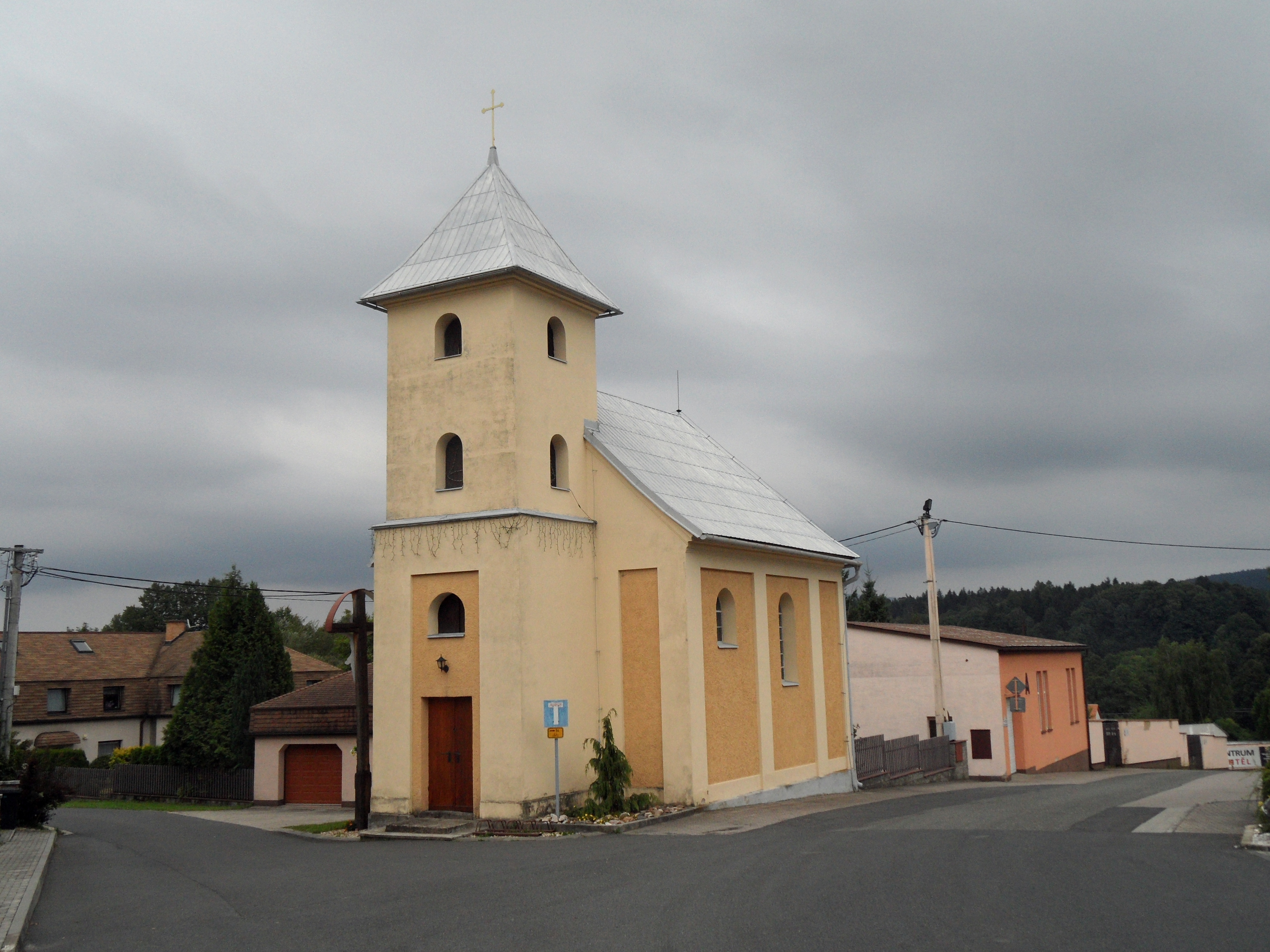
- Chapel of Saint Anne

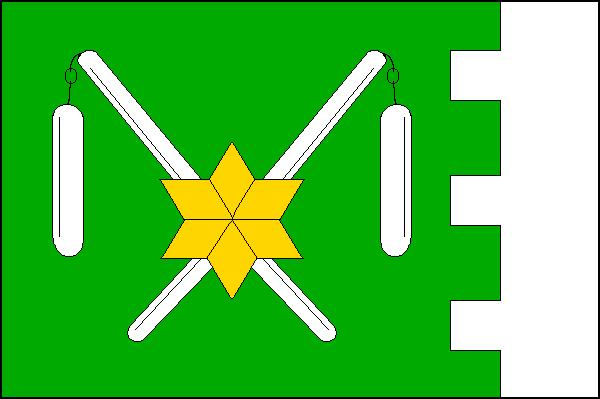
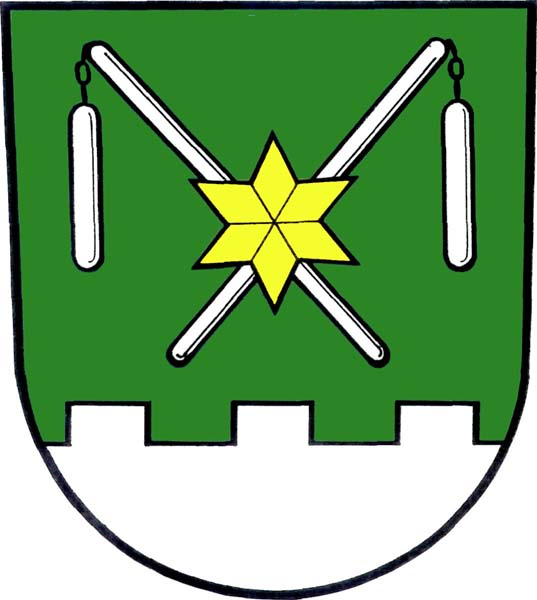
- Flag Coat of arms

- Location in the Czech Republic
- Coordinates: 50°16′57″N 17°16′55″E
- Country: Czech Republic
- Region: Olomouc
- District: Jeseník
- First mentioned: 1424

Area
  - Total: 4.49 km^{2} (1.73 sq mi)
- Elevation: 364 m (1,194 ft)

Population (2026-01-01)
  - Total: 390
  - Density: 87/km^{2} (220/sq mi)
- Time zone: UTC+1 (CET)
  - Summer (DST): UTC+2 (CEST)
- Postal code: 790 84
- Website: www.hradec-novaves.cz

Hradec-Nová Ves (German: Gröditz-Neudorf, Polish: Grodziec-Nowa Wieś) is a municipality and village in Jeseník District in the Olomouc Region of the Czech Republic. It has about 400 inhabitants.

Hradec-Nová Ves lies approximately 9 kilometres (6 mi) north-east of Jeseník, 78 km (48 mi) north of Olomouc, and 205 km (127 mi) east of Prague.

== Demographics ==
Historical population
Year	Pop.	±%
1869	690	—
1880	749	+8.6%
1890	768	+2.5%
1900	826	+7.6%
1910	800	−3.1%
1921	753	−5.9%
1930	931	+23.6%
1950	549	−41.0%
1961	542	−1.3%
1970	431	−20.5%
1980	336	−22.0%
1991	270	−19.6%
2001	305	+13.0%
2011	304	−0.3%
2021	363	+19.4%
Source: Censuses
