= Rejvíz =

- Village
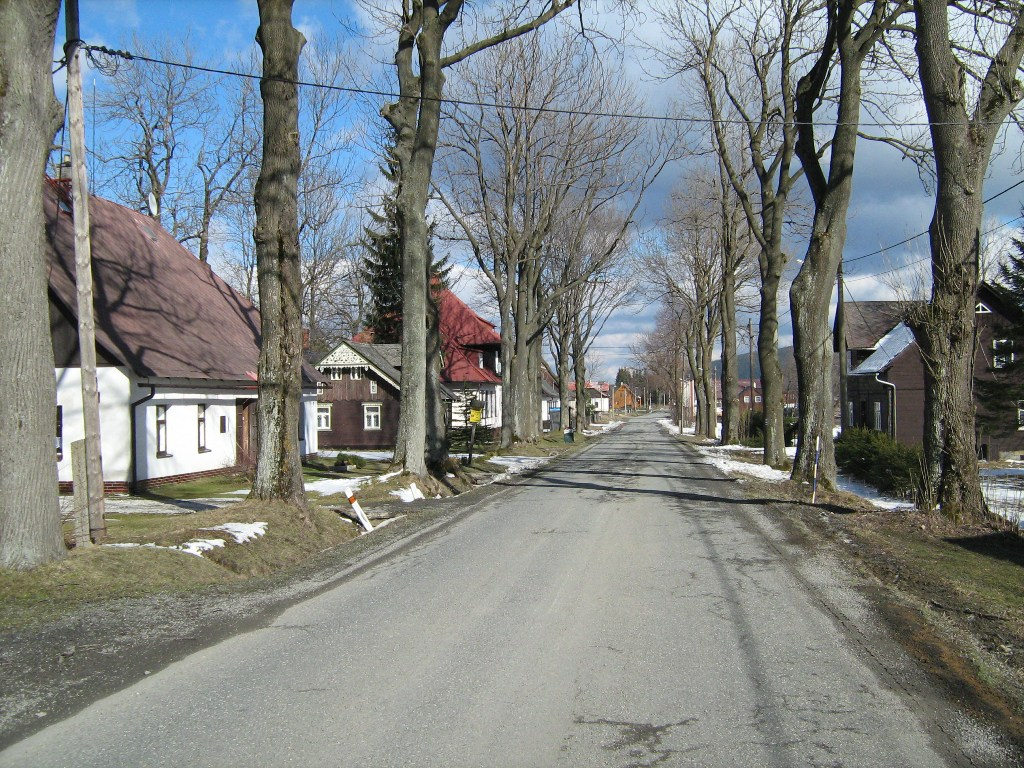
- Road through Rejvíz

- Location in the Czech Republic
- Coordinates: 50°13′48″N 17°18′36″E
- Country: Czech Republic
- Region: Olomouc
- District: Jeseník
- Municipality: Zlaté Hory
- First mentioned: 1768

Area
  - Total: 9.14 km^{2} (3.53 sq mi)
- Elevation: 778 m (2,552 ft)

Population (2021)
  - Total: 81
  - Density: 8.9/km^{2} (23/sq mi)
- Time zone: UTC+1 (CET)
  - Summer (DST): UTC+2 (CEST)
- Postal code: 793 76

Rejvíz (Czech pronunciation: [ˈrɛjviːs]; German: Reihwiesen) is a village and municipal part of Zlaté Hory in Jeseník District in the Olomouc Region of the Czech Republic. It is a popular tourist destination.

== Geography ==
Rejvíz lies in the Zlatohorská Highlands and also extends into the Hrubý Jeseník mountain range in the south. It is located in the Jeseníky Protected Landscape Area. At an altitude of 778 m (2,552 ft) above sea level, it is the highest village of Czech Silesia.

=== Nature ===
Rejvíz is also name of a national nature reserve, which was established in 1955 and covers 328.6 ha (812 acres). It is composed of the largest peat bog in Moravia and Czech Silesia with small lakes of glacial origin. Recent studies have found the Rejvíz bog to be one of the best preserved woody raised bog complexes in Central Europe as core sampling reveals its organic deposit started to accumulate nine thousands years ago or even earlier. An educational trail was opened in 1970 and leads from the Rejvíz Guesthouse to Velké mechové Lake in the western part of the nature reserve. It is 1.5 km long and there are six stops with information boards.

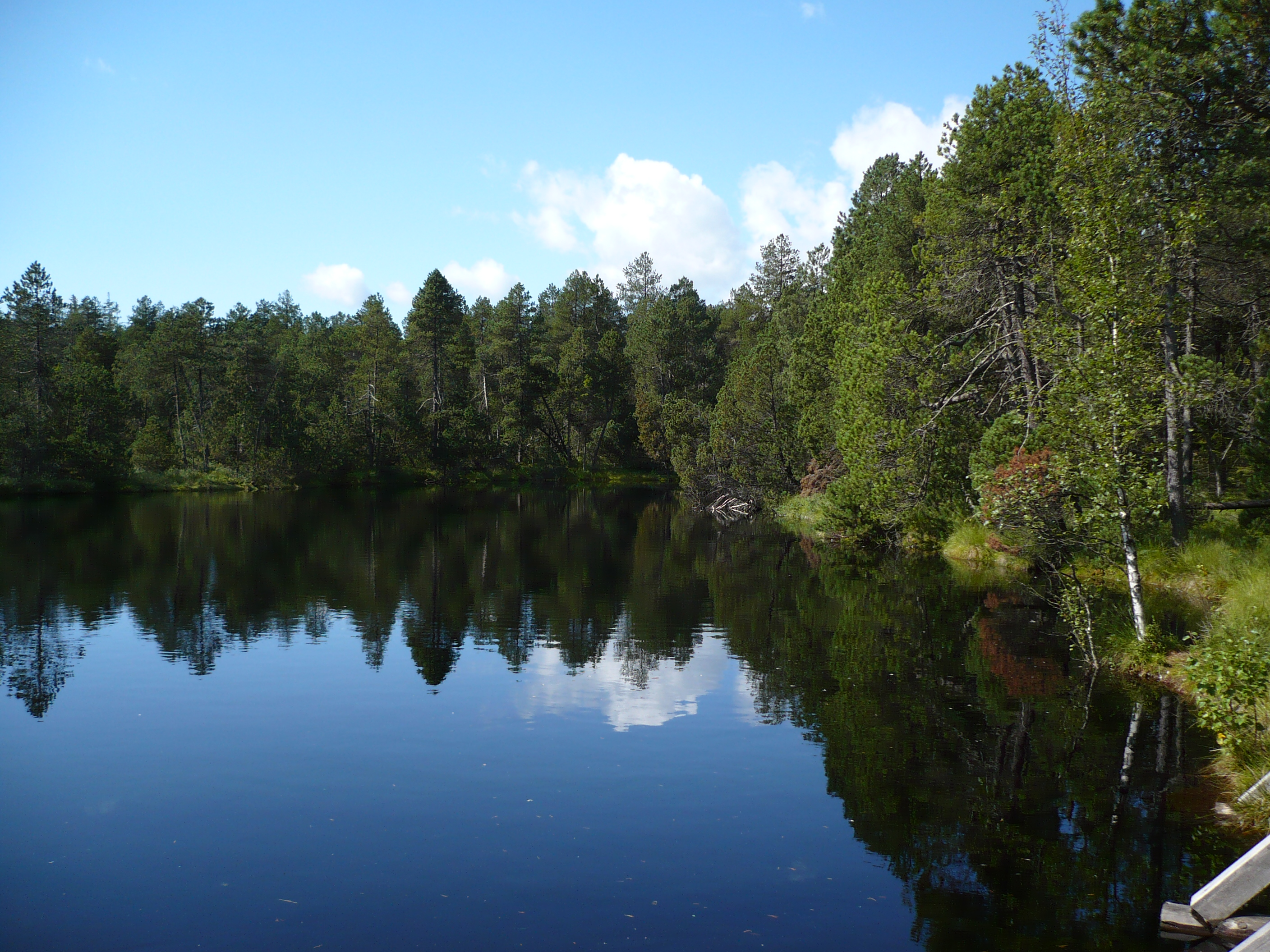
Velké mechové Lake

The area of Velké mechové Lake is 1,692 m^{2}. It is 68.5 m long and 41 m wide. Its depth is 2.95 m. Another lake, Malé mechové Lake, lies in the north-eastern part of the nature reserve. However, it is now completely overgrown with plants. The thickness of the peat layer is 6.6 m in this area, twice more than at Velké mechové Lake. Malé mechové Lake is not accessible to the public.

The peat bog is very rich in spiders. Other species living here include alpine newt, Carpathian newt and moor frog. Moorland clouded yellow and subarctic hawker are glacial relicts. When the last ice age ended many species moved to northern territories of Europe, but peat bogs provided good conditions for some of them here too.

The area is surrounded with woods consisting mainly of spruces, which are replaced with mountain pines towards the centre. The meadows are very rich in species of various plants. Among the most common ones there are horsetails, wood club-rush, Cirsium rivulare and meadowsweet. There are also a lot of rare species, such as few-flower sedge, fibrous tussock-sedge, flea sedge, tufted loosestrife or Gladiolus imbricatus.

Many other plants can be seen at the moss lakes, for example Sphagnum moss, cotton-grass, marsh Labrador tea and carnivorous common sundew.

== History ==
During World War II, the German occupiers operated the E781 forced labour subcamp of the Stalag VIII-B/344 prisoner-of-war camp for Allied POWs in the village.

== Demographics ==
Historical population

| Year | Pop. | ±% |
|---|---|---|
| 1869 | 406 | — |
| 1880 | 393 | −3.2% |
| 1890 | 403 | +2.5% |
| 1900 | 370 | −8.2% |
| 1910 | 358 | −3.2% |

| Year | Pop. | ±% |
|---|---|---|
| 1921 | 335 | −6.4% |
| 1930 | 351 | +4.8% |
| 1950 | 207 | −41.0% |
| 1961 | 131 | −36.7% |
| 1970 | 113 | −13.7% |

| Year | Pop. | ±% |
|---|---|---|
| 1980 | 85 | −24.8% |
| 1991 | 63 | −25.9% |
| 2001 | 66 | +4.8% |
| 2011 | 80 | +21.2% |
| 2021 | 81 | +1.2% |

Source: Censuses

== Sights ==
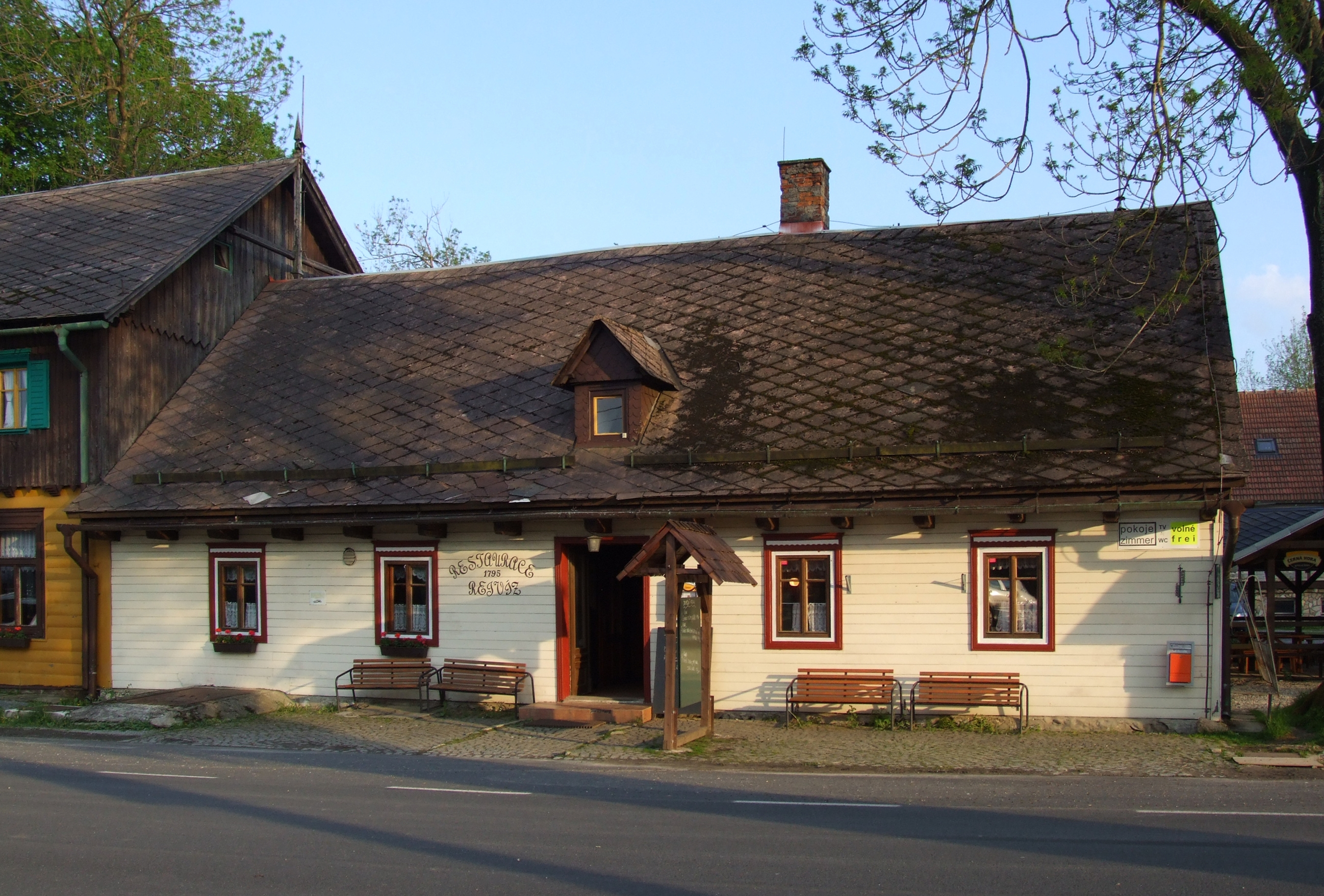
Rejvíz Guesthouse

The Rejvíz Guesthouse is a popular sight because of its wooden interior from the early 20th century, carved by its owners, the Brauner brothers. Its part are also chairs with carved faces of regular customers of that time. In the time of the communist regime it was called Nosek Cottage, after the first Czechoslovak communist Minister of Interior Václav Nosek.
