= Černá Voda =

- Municipality
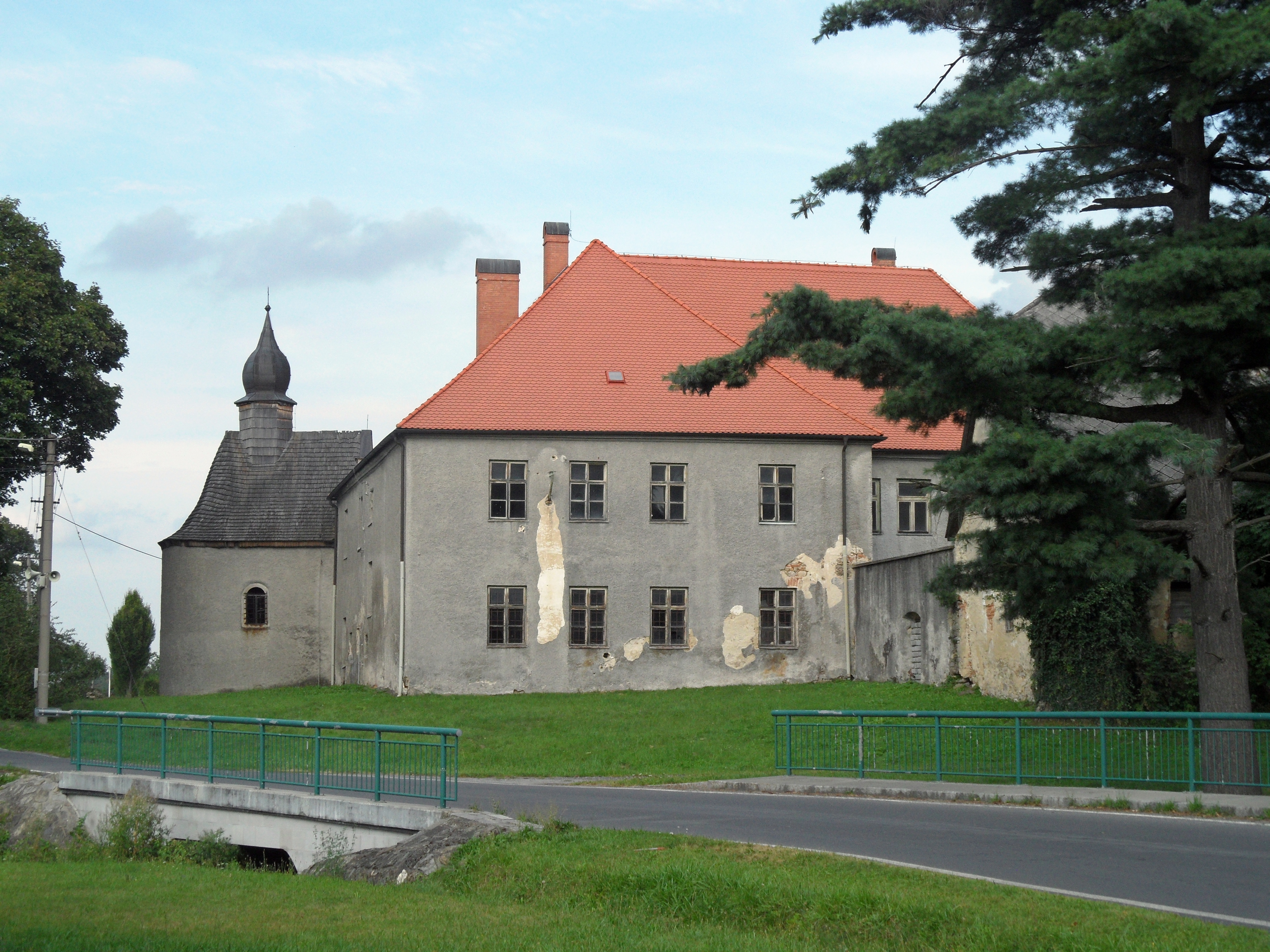
- Černá Voda Castle

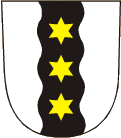
- Flag Coat of arms

- Location in the Czech Republic
- Coordinates: 50°18′30″N 17°8′49″E
- Country: Czech Republic
- Region: Olomouc
- District: Jeseník
- First mentioned: 1284

Area
  - Total: 9.97 km^{2} (3.85 sq mi)
- Elevation: 340 m (1,120 ft)

Population (2026-01-01)
  - Total: 536
  - Density: 53.8/km^{2} (139/sq mi)
- Time zone: UTC+1 (CET)
  - Summer (DST): UTC+2 (CEST)
- Postal code: 790 54
- Website: www.obeccernavoda.cz

Černá Voda (German: Schwarzwasser) is a municipality and village in Jeseník District in the Olomouc Region of the Czech Republic. It has about 500 inhabitants.

Černá Voda lies approximately 9 kilometres (6 mi) north of Jeseník, 80 km (50 mi) north of Olomouc, and 197 km (122 mi) east of Prague.

== Demographics ==
Historical population
Year	Pop.	±%
1869	1,953	—
1880	2,089	+7.0%
1890	2,049	−1.9%
1900	2,159	+5.4%
1910	2,147	−0.6%
1921	1,979	−7.8%
1930	2,182	+10.3%
1950	1,030	−52.8%
1961	946	−8.2%
1970	877	−7.3%
1980	781	−10.9%
1991	645	−17.4%
2001	665	+3.1%
2011	586	−11.9%
2021	516	−11.9%
Source: Censuses
