= Kobylá nad Vidnavkou =

- Municipality
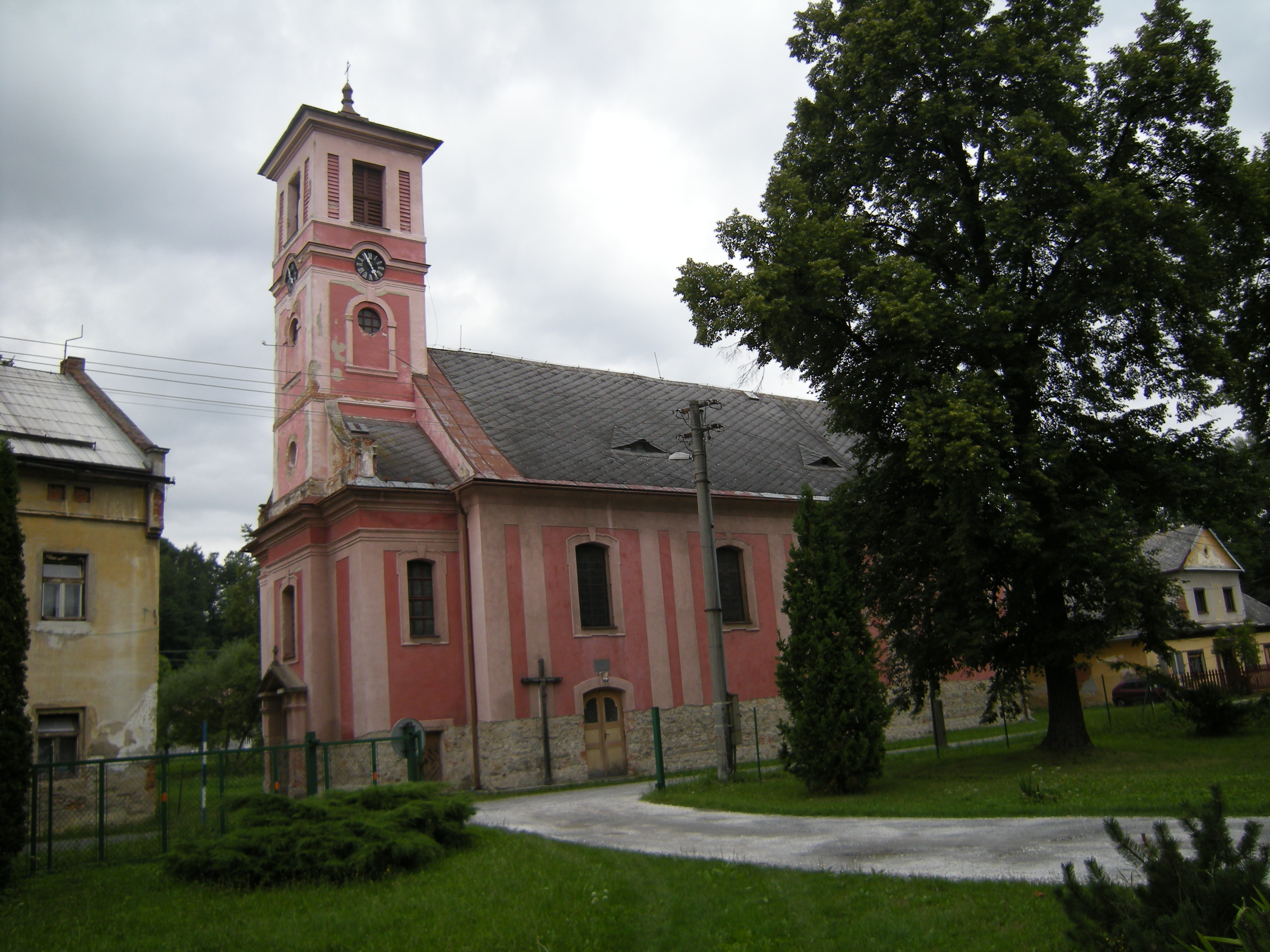
- Church of Saint Joachim

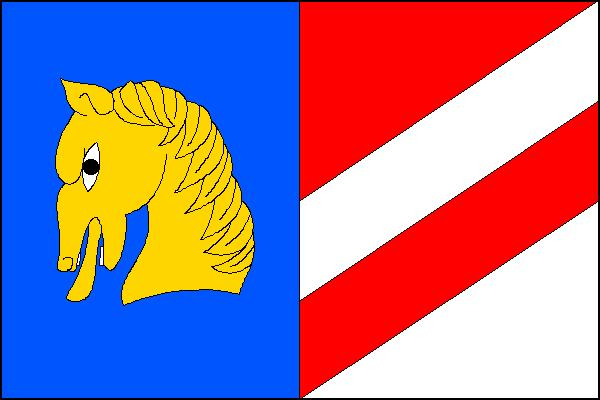
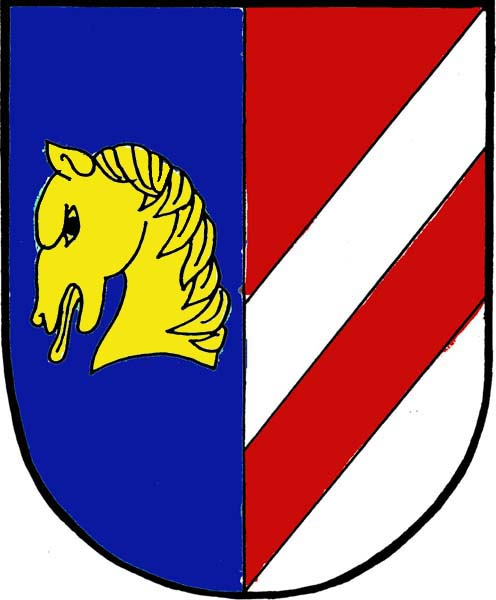
- Flag Coat of arms

- Location in the Czech Republic
- Coordinates: 50°20′31″N 17°7′25″E
- Country: Czech Republic
- Region: Olomouc
- District: Jeseník
- First mentioned: 1266

Area
  - Total: 10.81 km^{2} (4.17 sq mi)
- Elevation: 290 m (950 ft)

Population (2026-01-01)
  - Total: 353
  - Density: 32.7/km^{2} (84.6/sq mi)
- Time zone: UTC+1 (CET)
  - Summer (DST): UTC+2 (CEST)
- Postal code: 790 65
- Website: www.oukobyla.cz

Kobylá nad Vidnavkou (German: Jungferndorf) is a municipality and village in Jeseník District in the Olomouc Region of the Czech Republic. It has about 400 inhabitants.

Kobylá nad Vidnavkou lies approximately 14 kilometres (9 mi) north-west of Jeseník, 84 km (52 mi) north of Olomouc, and 195 km (121 mi) east of Prague.

== Demographics ==
Historical population
Year	Pop.	±%
1869	938	—
1880	959	+2.2%
1890	967	+0.8%
1900	937	−3.1%
1910	894	−4.6%
1921	891	−0.3%
1930	984	+10.4%
1950	525	−46.6%
1961	519	−1.1%
1970	534	+2.9%
1980	536	+0.4%
1991	494	−7.8%
2001	498	+0.8%
2011	435	−12.7%
2021	366	−15.9%
Source: Censuses
