= Josef Jüttner =

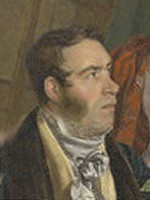
Josef Jüttner

Josef Jüttner (12 September 1775 – 27 April 1848) was a Czech cartographer and military leader. He was a general in the Imperial Austrian Army and was the author of the first exact map of Prague based on geodetic measurement.

== Life ==
Jüttner's map of Prague

Jüttner was born on 12 September 1775 in Bernartice, Silesia. He studied at the gymnasium in Bílá Voda near Javorník. In 1793, he entered the Austrian army, and between 1794–1795 fought against France. He spent the years 1799–1800 as an artillery soldier in Ingolstadt, where he attended lectures on mathematics and physics at the Jesuit University.

Starting in 1801, Jüttner taught at the mathematical school in Prague. In 1808 Jüttner became the director of this school.

The etching for the map was done by Prague's graphic master Josef Alois Drda; the lettering by Alois Mussil. In 1818, Franz Anton von Kolowrat-Liebsteinsky issued a number of good quality copies of the map under the title Grundriß der königlichen Hauptstadt Prag at a scale of 500 Viennese lots (60 lots = 1 finger).

Jüttner died on 27 April 1848 in Prague.
