= Česká Ves =

- Municipality
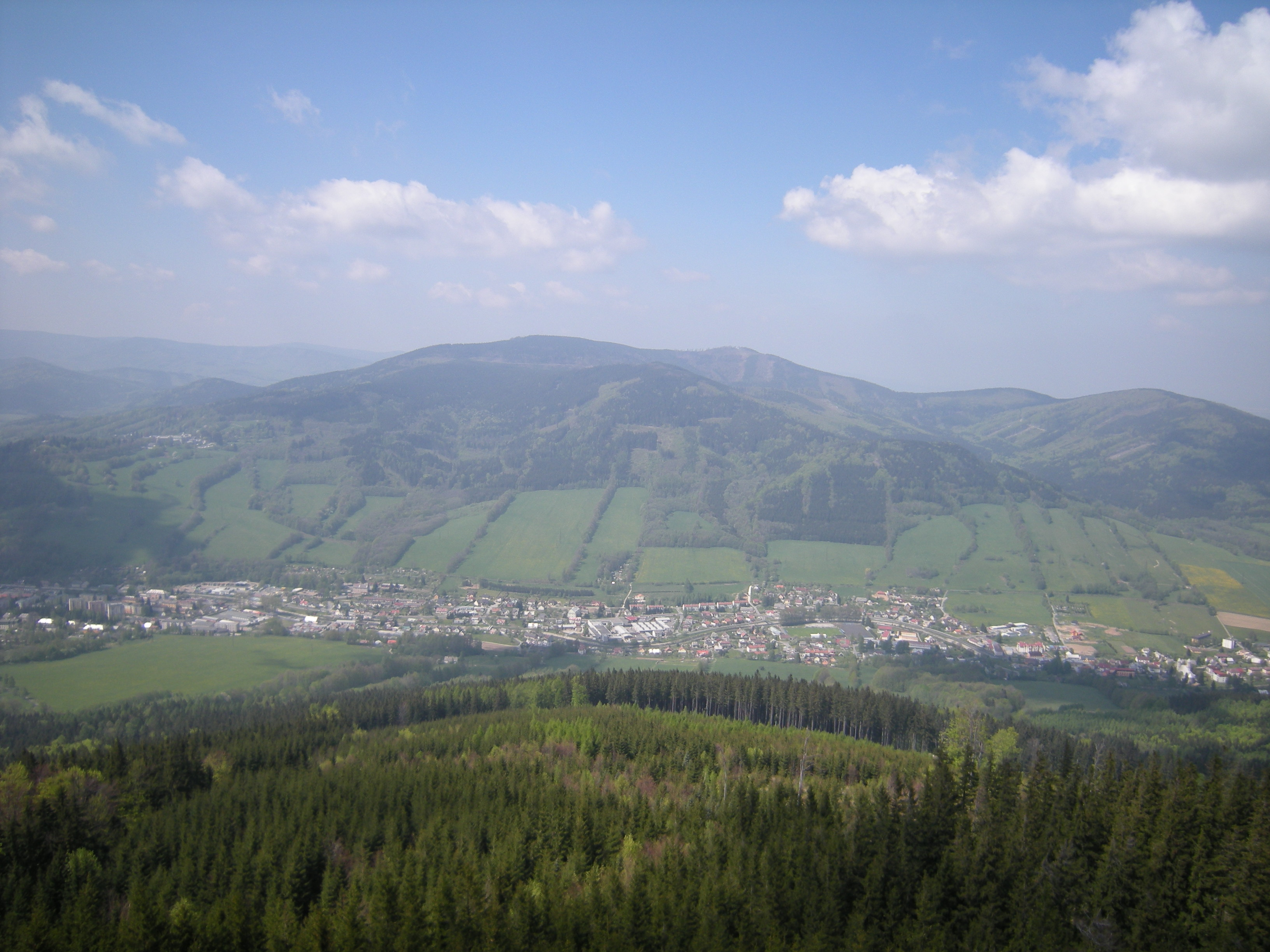
- Panorama of Česká Ves

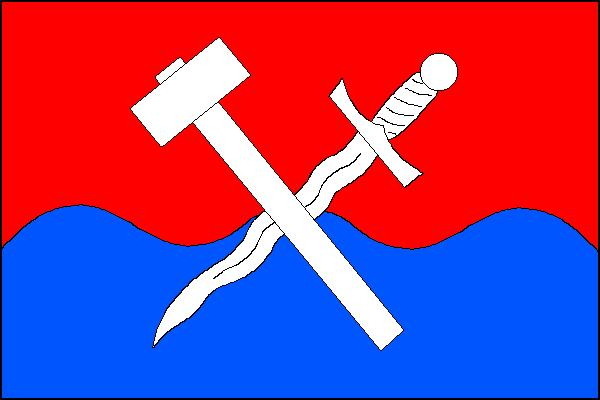
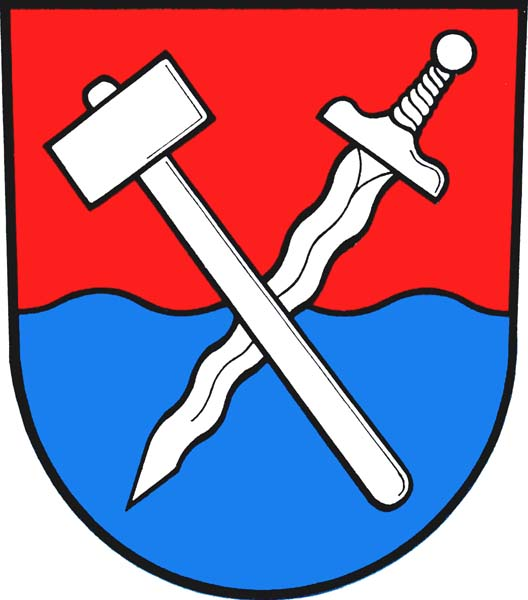
- Flag Coat of arms

- Location in the Czech Republic
- Coordinates: 50°15′27″N 17°13′41″E
- Country: Czech Republic
- Region: Olomouc
- District: Jeseník
- First mentioned: 1416

Area
  - Total: 24.51 km^{2} (9.46 sq mi)
- Elevation: 399 m (1,309 ft)

Population (2026-01-01)
  - Total: 2,258
  - Density: 92.13/km^{2} (238.6/sq mi)
- Time zone: UTC+1 (CET)
  - Summer (DST): UTC+2 (CEST)
- Postal code: 790 81
- Website: www.cves.cz

Česká Ves (German: Böhmischdorf) is a municipality and village in Jeseník District in the Olomouc Region of the Czech Republic. It has about 2,300 inhabitants.

== Etymology ==
The name means 'Czech village' in Czech.

== Geography ==
Česká Ves is located north of Jeseník and is urbanistically fused with the town. It is located about 73 km (45 mi) north of Olomouc. The eastern part of the municipality lies in the Zlatohorská Highlands and the western part lies in the Golden Mountains. The highest point is the hill Studniční vrch at 992 m (3,255 ft) above sea level. The village is situated in the valley of the Bělá River. The municipality is partially located in the Jeseníky Protected Landscape Area.

== History ==
The first written mention of Česká Ves is from 1416. A hamlet named Waltherowici, which was a predecessor of the current village, was documented in 1284.

The 17th century was tragic for Česká Ves. The village was hit by the plague epidemic in 1627, looted during the Thirty Years' War, and was at the centre of the infamous Northern Moravia witch trials, during which 16 women were burned.

According to the Austro-Hungarian census of 1910, the village had 2,434 inhabitants, all spoke German as their native language. The most populous religious group were Roman Catholics with 2,417 (99.3%).

The municipality was severely hit by the 1997 Central European flood.

== Demographics ==
Historical population

Year	Pop.	±%
1869	2,170	—
1880	2,218	+2.2%
1890	2,297	+3.6%
1900	2,446	+6.5%
1910	2,434	−0.5%

Year	Pop.	±%
1921	2,560	+5.2%
1930	2,693	+5.2%
1950	1,511	−43.9%
1961	1,562	+3.4%
1970	1,437	−8.0%

Year	Pop.	±%
1980	1,972	+37.2%
1991	2,277	+15.5%
2001	2,485	+9.1%
2011	2,363	−4.9%
2021	2,332	−1.3%

Source: Censuses

== Economy ==
The main employer is the Řetězárna a.s company. It is a traditional Czech manufacturer of chains, founded in 1894. Vegetus, a Ukrainian producer of meat and dairy substitutes, has relocated to Česká Ves due to the 2022 Russian invasion of Ukraine.

== Transport ==
Česká Ves, served by the Česká Ves bazén station, is located on the Krnov–Jeseník railway line. The station called Česká Ves is unused.

== Sights ==
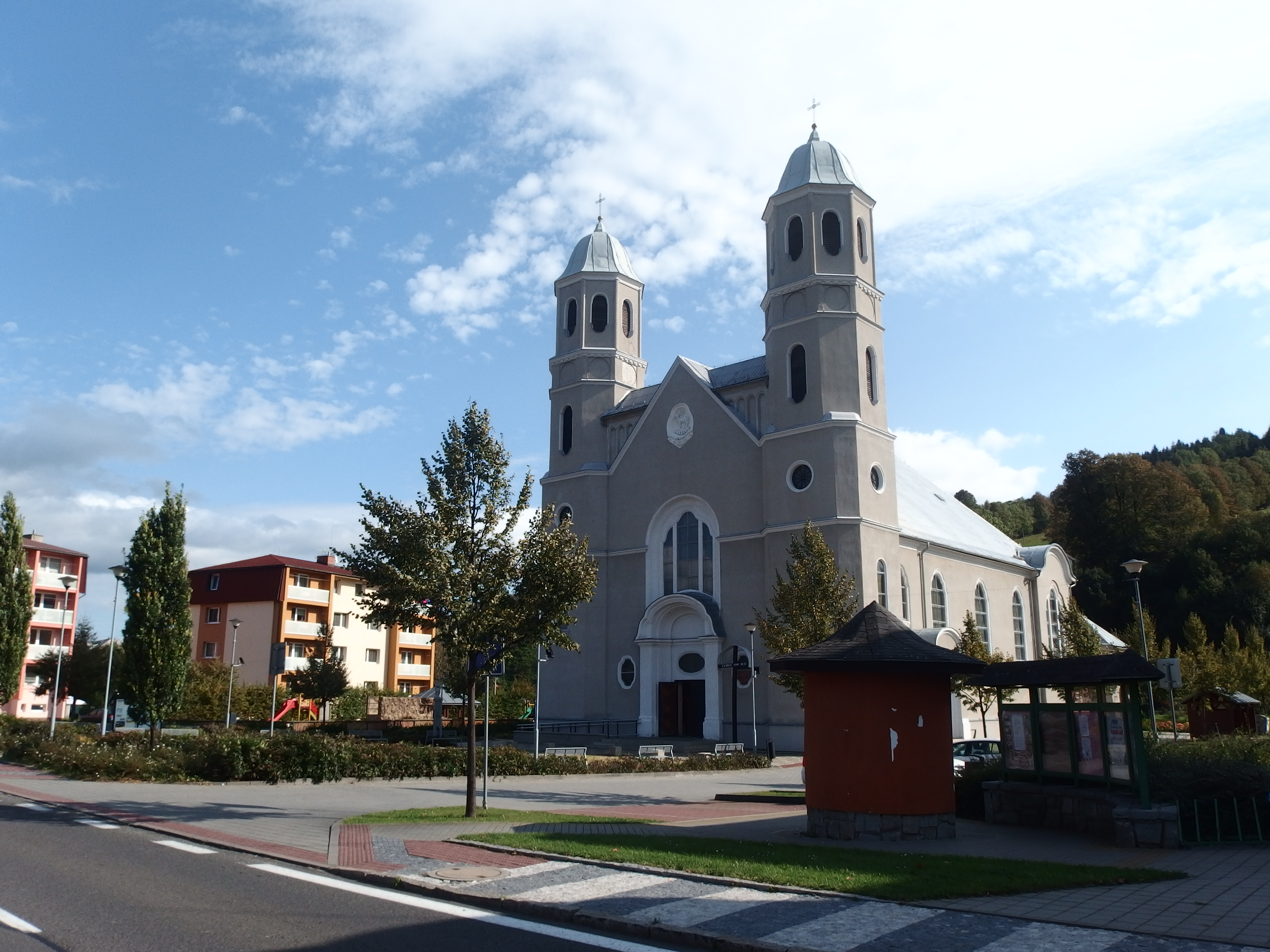
Church of Saint Joseph

The main landmark of Česká Ves is the Church of Saint Joseph. It was built in 1928, which makes it one of the youngest churches in the region. It replaced the Chapel of Saint Dominic from 1695.

== Notable people ==
- Johann Schroth (1798–1856), Austrian naturopath
