= Lipová-lázně =

- Municipality
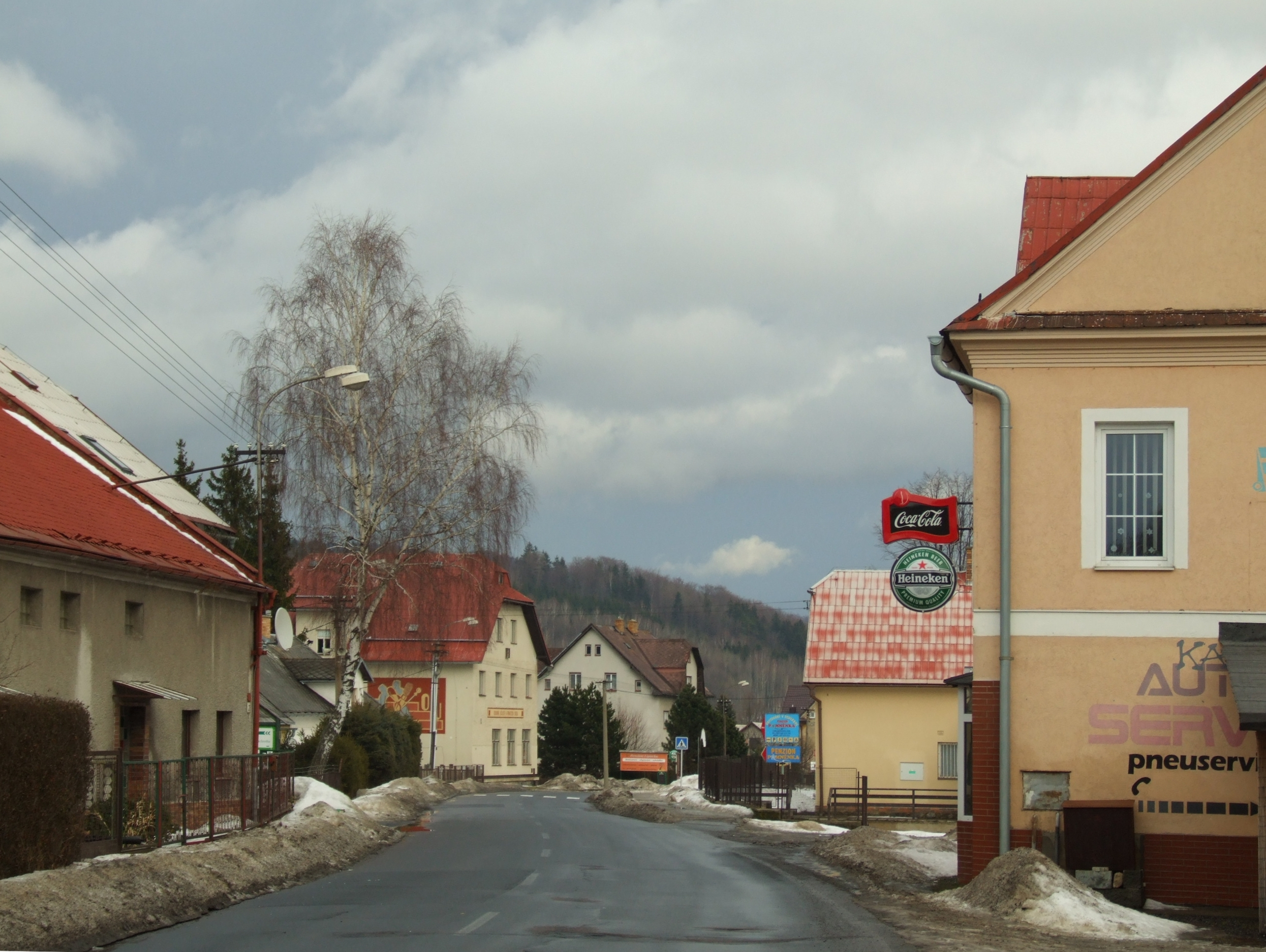
- Main street

- Flag Coat of arms

- Location in the Czech Republic
- Coordinates: 50°13′40″N 17°8′26″E
- Country: Czech Republic
- Region: Olomouc
- District: Jeseník
- First mentioned: 1290

Area
  - Total: 44.37 km^{2} (17.13 sq mi)
- Elevation: 498 m (1,634 ft)

Population (2026-01-01)
  - Total: 2,020
  - Density: 45.5/km^{2} (118/sq mi)
- Time zone: UTC+1 (CET)
  - Summer (DST): UTC+2 (CEST)
- Postal codes: 790 61, 790 63
- Website: lipova-lazne.cz

Lipová-lázně (until 1960 Dolní Lipová; German: Bad Lindewiese) is a spa municipality and village in Jeseník District in the Olomouc Region of the Czech Republic. It has about 2,000 inhabitants.

== Administrative division ==
Lipová-lázně consists of three municipal parts (in brackets population according to the 2021 census):

- Lipová-lázně (1,655)
- Bobrovník (19)
- Horní Lipová (294)

== Geography ==
Lipová-lázně is located about 4 kilometres (2 mi) west of Jeseník and 70 km (43 mi) north of Olomouc. The northern part of the municipality lies in the Golden Mountains, the southern part lies in the Hrubý Jeseník mountains. The highest point is the peak of Šerák at 1,351 m (4,432 ft) above sea level, located on the southern municipal border. The built-up area is situated in the valley of the Staříč Stream.

== History ==
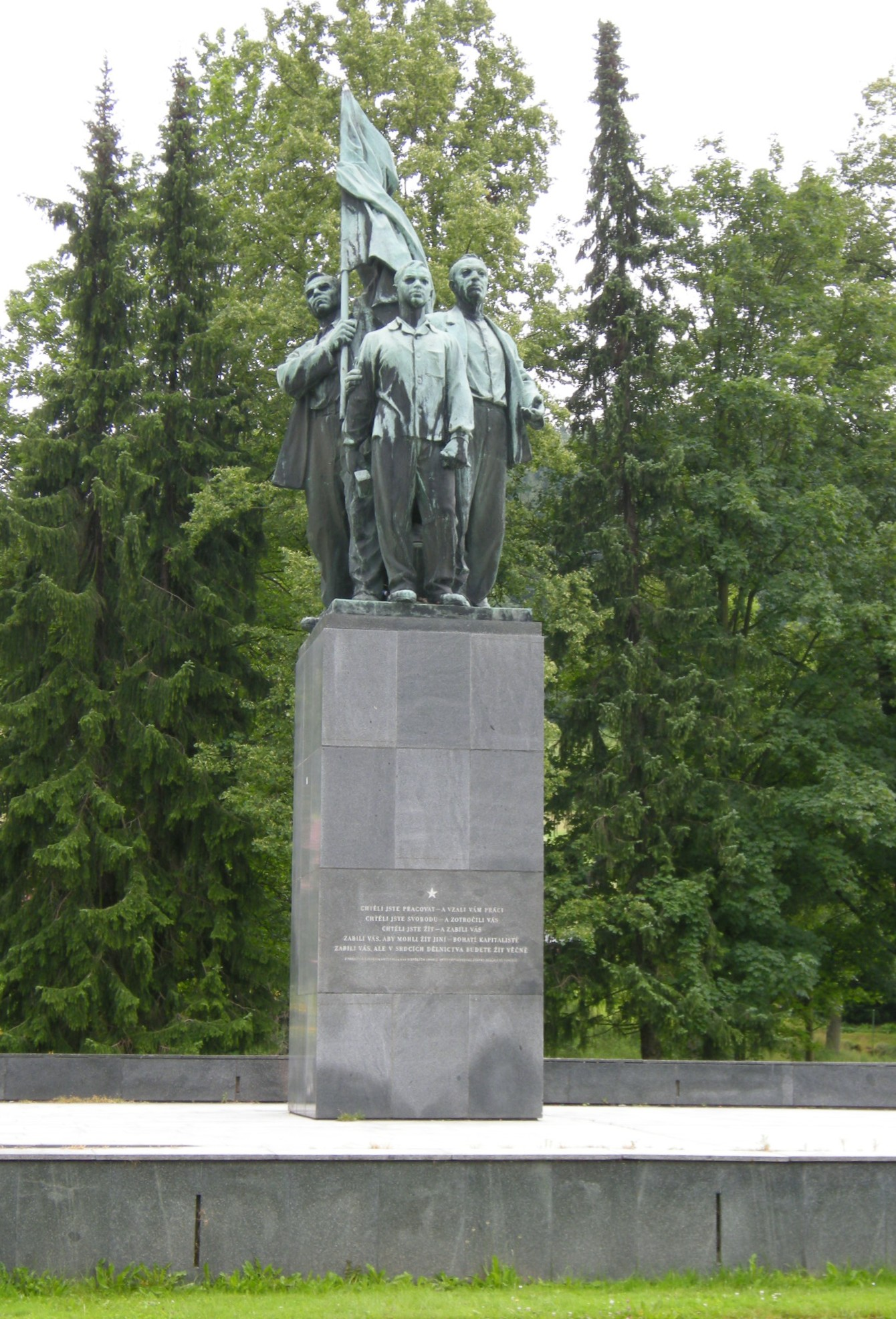
Memorial to the victims of the Freiwaldau Strike

The first written mention of Dolní Lipová under its Latin name Lynda is in a copy of a document, which describes the situation in 1290. At that time it became part of the newly formed Duchy of Nysa within fragmented Piast-ruled Poland. The next records are from the years 1372 and 1420. After that, the village was probably partially or completely abandoned and was not resettled until the mid-16th century.

The village was relatively unaffected by the Thirty Years' War, but several local women died during the infamous Northern Moravia witch trials between 1622 and 1684. The first written mention of Horní Lipová is from 1689.

In 1888, the railway was opened.

On 25 November 1931, an event known as the "Freiwaldau Strike" took place in Lipová-lázně. The local Communist party organised a hunger march of around 1,000 unemployed stoneworkers to Jeseník. The police chief at Vápenná instructed his men to prevent the demonstration from reaching the town. The police forced the marchers to take an alternative route through the forest. The police soon caught up with them at Lipová-lázně, and a clash ensued during which the marchers threw sticks, stones and other objects at the gendarmes. After two stones hit the commander of the unit on the forehead, the gendarmes started shooting at the crowd. As a result, eight people were killed and ten people were seriously injured and taken to the hospital. A memorial was erected in 1951 to commemorate this event.

From 1938 to 1945, the municipality was annexed by Nazi Germany and administered as part of the Reichsgau Sudetenland. During World War II, the German occupiers operated the E797 forced labour subcamp of the Stalag VIII-B/344 prisoner-of-war camp in Lipová-lázně, and E333 and E380 subcamps in Horní Lipová.

== Demographics ==
Historical population

Year	Pop.	±%
1869	3,594	—
1880	3,864	+7.5%
1890	4,131	+6.9%
1900	4,326	+4.7%
1910	4,559	+5.4%

Year	Pop.	±%
1921	4,203	−7.8%
1930	4,844	+15.3%
1950	2,569	−47.0%
1961	2,706	+5.3%
1970	2,389	−11.7%

Year	Pop.	±%
1980	2,408	+0.8%
1991	2,497	+3.7%
2001	2,542	+1.8%
2011	2,247	−11.6%
2021	1,968	−12.4%

Source: Censuses

== Economy ==
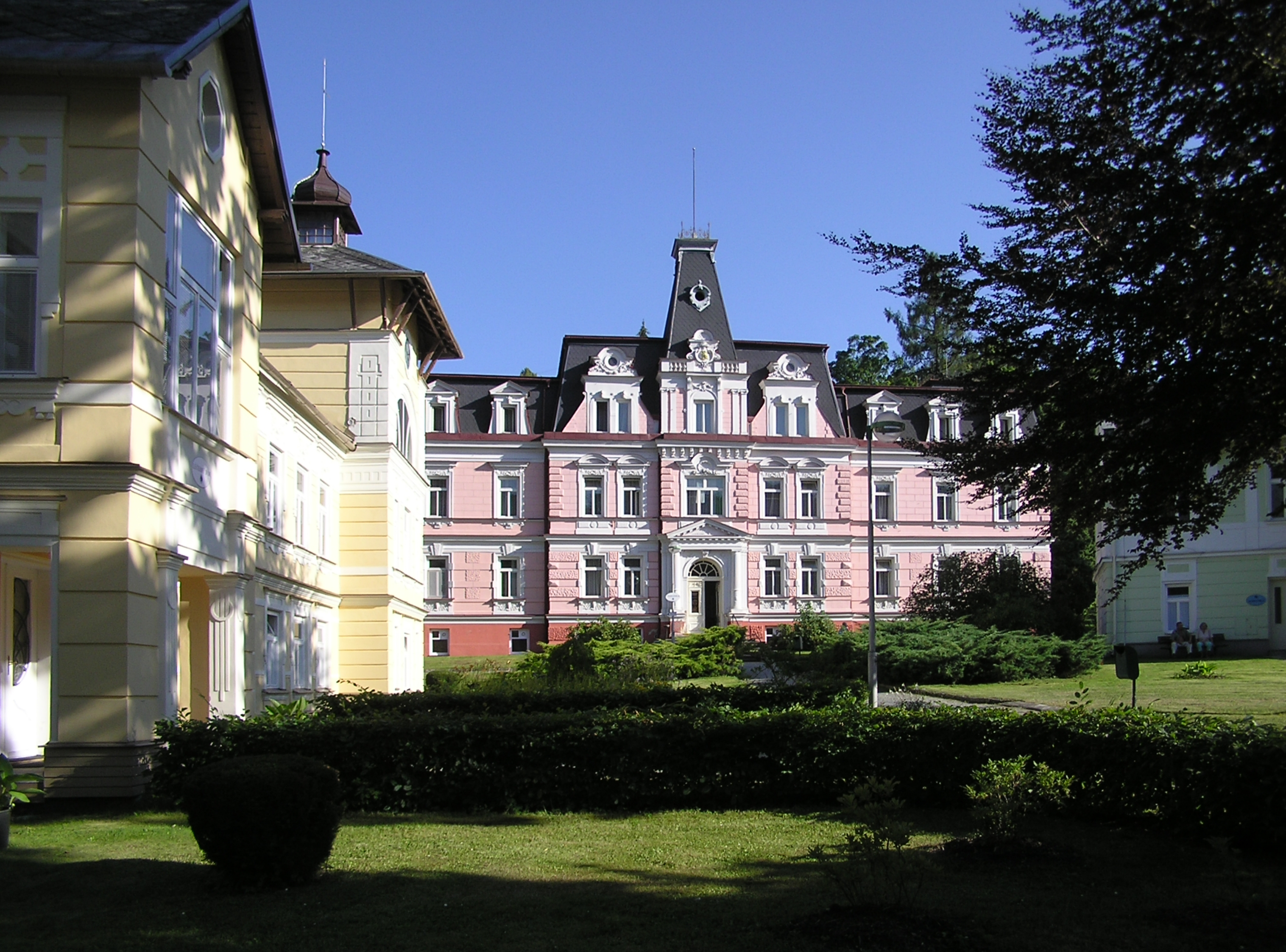
Spa buildings

The municipality is known for its spa, established in 1837 by Johann Schroth.

== Transport ==
Lipová-lázně is located on the railway lines Šumperk–Jeseník, Zábřeh–Jeseník and Lipová-lázně–Javorník.

== Sights ==
The main landmark is the Church of Saint Wenceslaus. It was built in 1788, on the site of an older small chapel from the 17th century.

== Notable people ==
- Johann Schroth (1798–1856), Austrian naturopath; worked and died here

== Twin towns – sister cities ==
Lipová-lázně is twinned with:

- Krapkowice, Poland
