= Vidnava Lowland =

Lowland in Poland and the Czech Republic

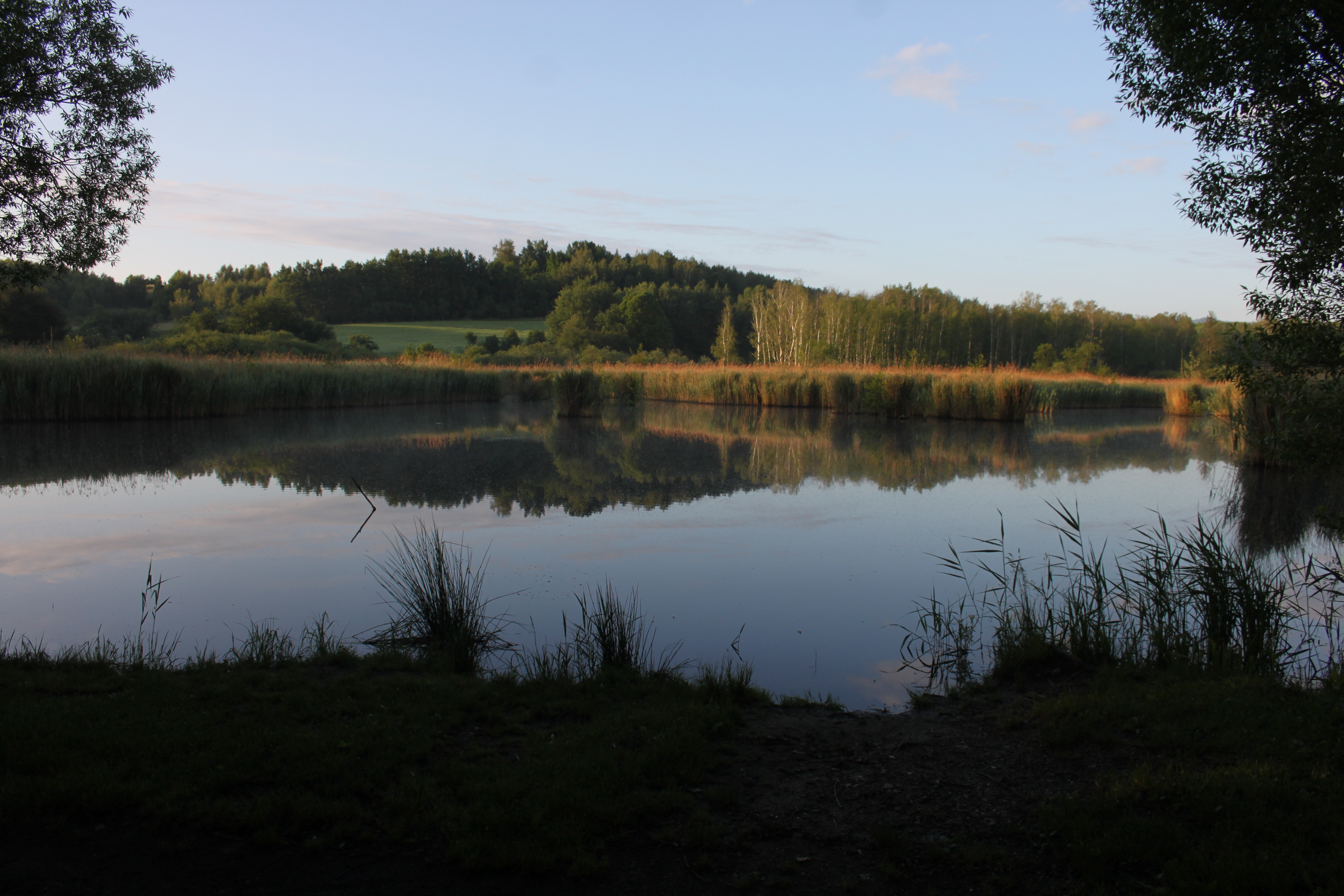
- Vidnavské mokřiny Nature Reserve

Highest point
- Peak: a contour line
- Elevation: 351 m (1,152 ft)

Dimensions
- Area: 160 km^{2} (62 mi^{2})

Geography
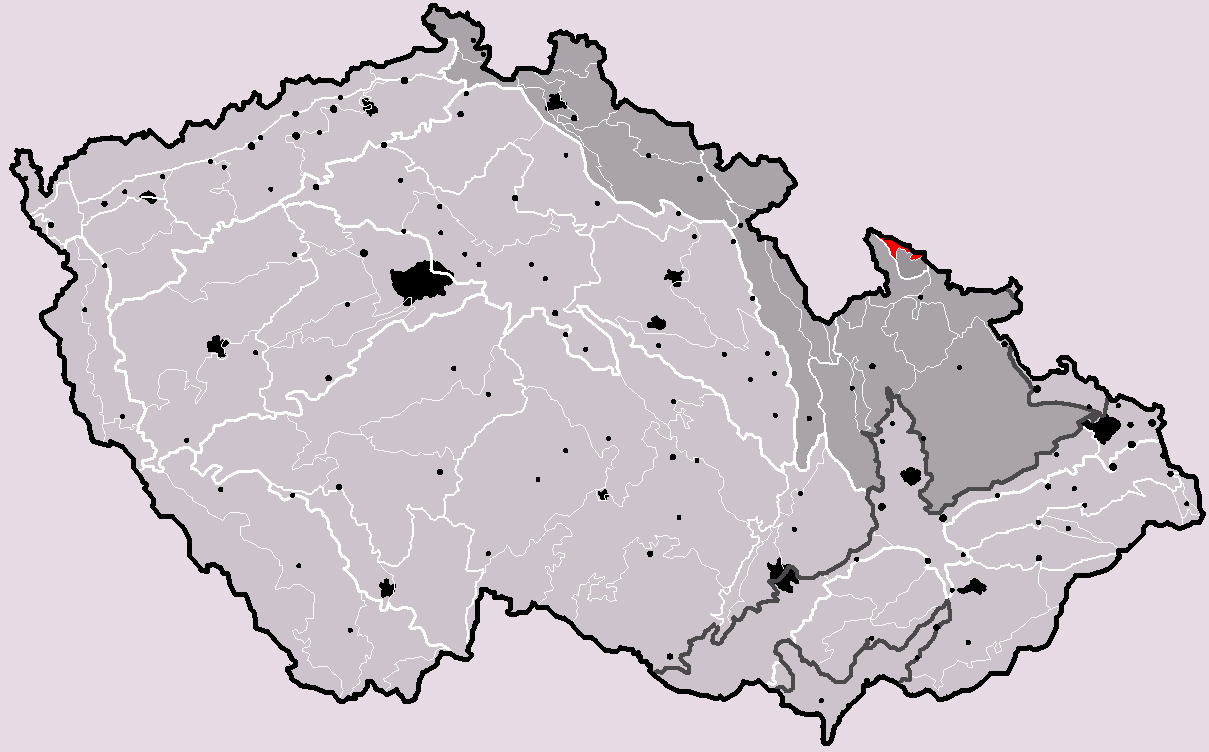
- Vidnava Lowland in the geomorphological system of the Czech Republic
- Countries: Poland, Czech Republic
- Voivodeships/ Regions: Opole, Lower Silesian/ Olomouc
- Range coordinates: 50°25′N 17°2′E
- Parent range: Sudeten Foreland

Geology
- Rock type(s): Loam, clay

The Vidnava Lowland (Czech: Vidnavská nížina, Polish: Przedgórze Paczkowskie) is a lowland and geomorphological mesoregion in Poland and in the Czech Republic. It is located in the Sudeten Foreland macroregion.

== Geomorphology ==
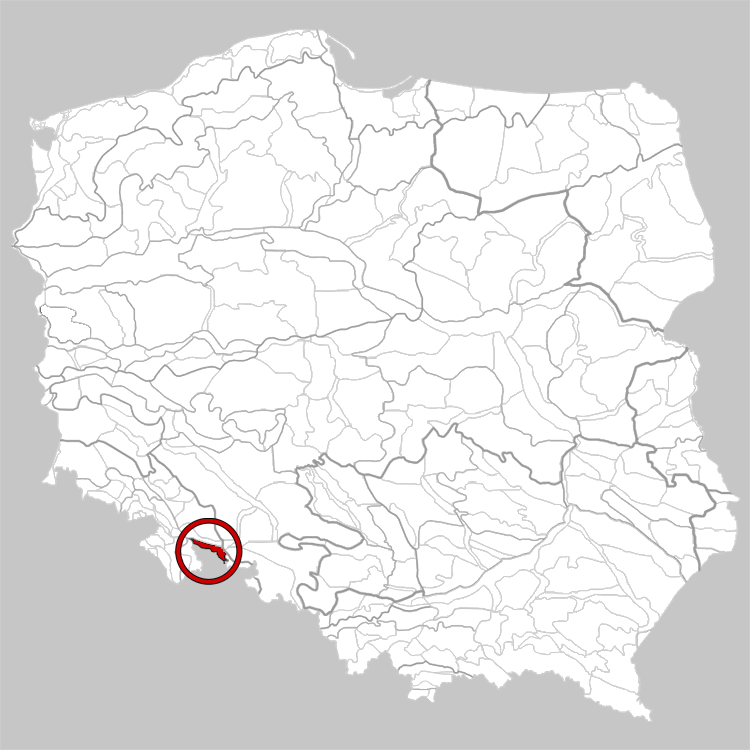
Vidnava Lowland in the geomorphological system of Poland

The Vidnava Lowland is a mesoregion of the Sudeten Foreland within the Bohemian Massif. The relief was formed mainly by the movement of the Quaternary glacier. There are glacial erratics in the area. Vertical movements of the earth's crust allowed the lowland to deepen compared to the surroundings.

The landscape is slightly undulating, without notable hills. The highest point of the lowland is a contour line at 351 m (1,152 ft) above sea level, located near Vlčice, where the lowland borders the Golden Mountains.

== Geology ==
The bedrock is composed mainly of Tertiary and Quaternary sediments (loams, clays).

There was once a wide river in the area. Its banks were made of kaolin, which was formed by the weathering of Paleozoic granite. Kaolin was mined here.

== Geography ==
The Vidnava Lowland is located mostly in the Opole Voivodeship (Poland) and Olomouc Region (Czech Republic), only a small part in the west extends into the Lower Silesian Voivodeship. The lowland extends from Paczków in its northwestern part to Vidnava in its southeastern part.

The Vidnava Lowland has an area of about 160 km^{2} (62 sq mi), of which 47 km^{2} (18 sq mi) is in the Czech Republic. Within the Czech Republic, it has an average elevation of 270 m (890 ft).

There are no significant watercourses. The area is drained by the streams Vidnávka (Polish: Widna) and Raczyna (Czech: Račí potok). Both are tributaries of the Eastern Neisse River, which flows along the northern border of the territory, just outside the territory.

== Nature ==
The landscape is predominantly agricultural. The only protected area is the Vidnavské mokřiny Nature Reserve, located in the easternmost part of the lowland. The nature reserve has an area of 32.0 ha (79 acres). The subject of protection are peat and wetland meadows with endangered and protected plant species (mainly rigid bogmoss) and animals (mainly dusky large blue). A similarly defined area of 38.1 ha (94 acres) is protected as a Special Area of Conservation.
