= Žulová Hilly Land =

Hill range in the Czech Republic

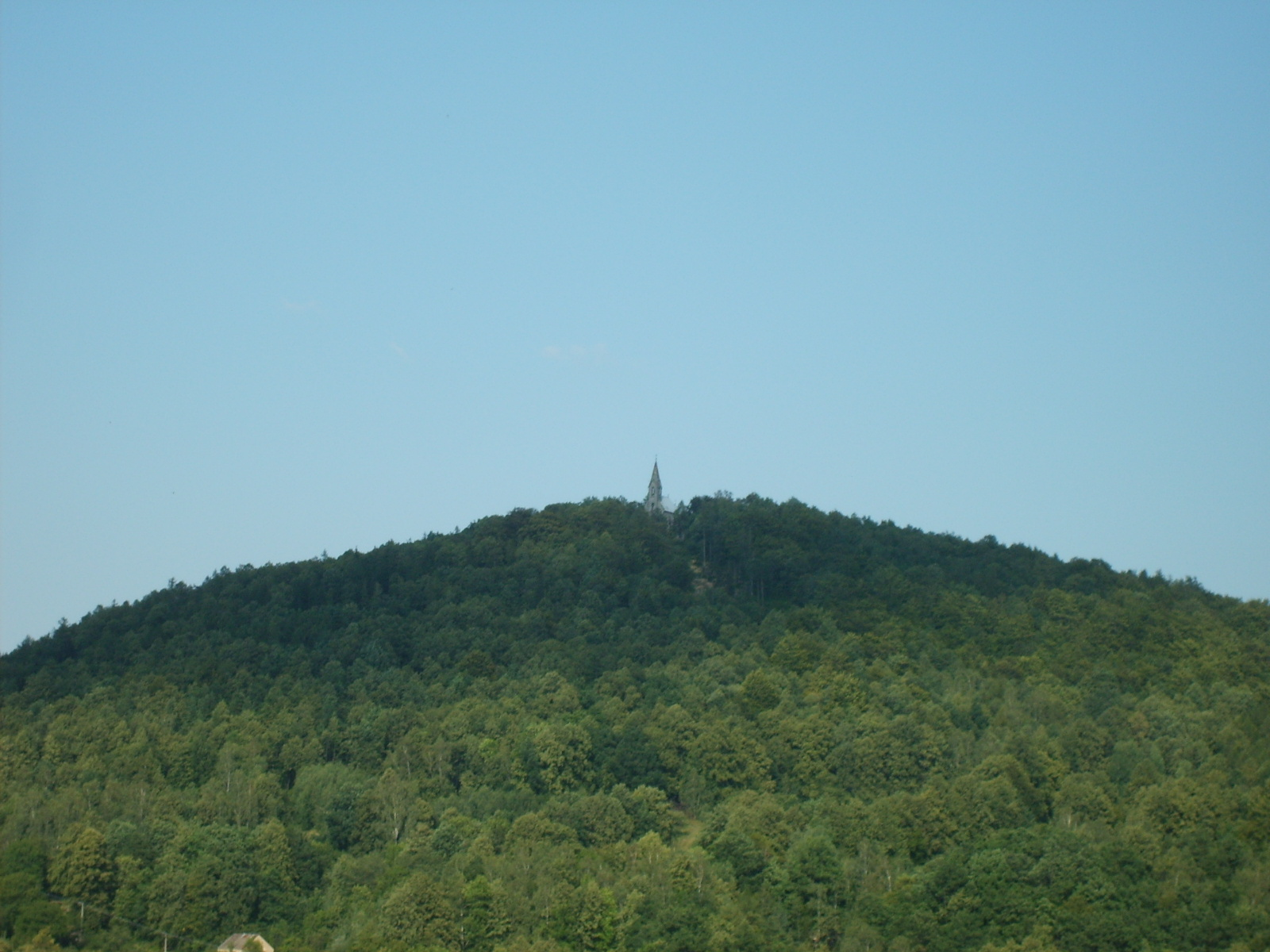
- Boží hora

Highest point
- Peak: Boží hora
- Elevation: 527 m (1,729 ft)

Dimensions
- Area: 107 km^{2} (41 mi^{2})

Geography
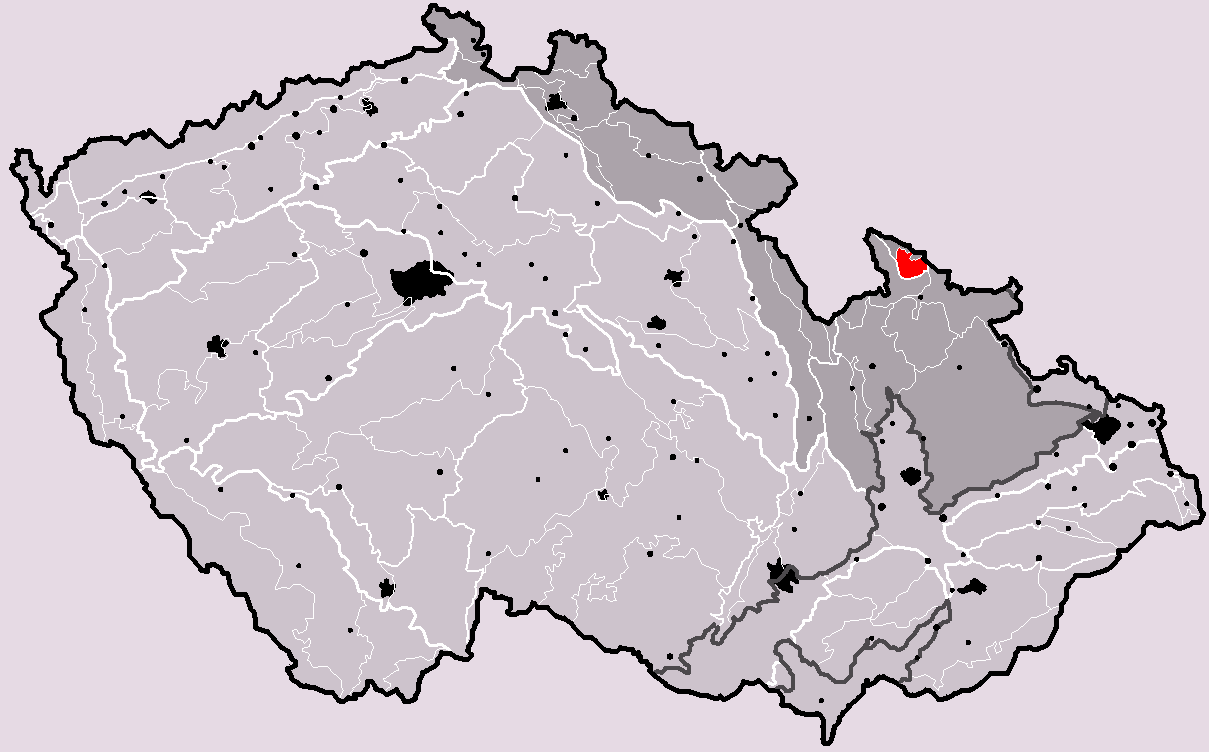
- Žulová Hilly Land in the geomorphological system of the Czech Republic
- Country: Czech Republic
- Region: Olomouc
- Range coordinates: 50°20′N 17°9′E
- Parent range: Sudeten Foreland

Geology
- Rock type(s): Granite, granodiorite

The Žulová Hilly Land (Czech: Žulovská pahorkatina) are an upland and a geomorphological mesoregion in the Czech Republic. It is located in the Olomouc Region in the Sudeten Foreland macroregion.

== Geomorphology ==
The Žulová Hilly Land is a mesoregion of the Sudeten Foreland within the Bohemian Massif. Typical relief elements include solitary hills formed in the Tertiary period, roches moutonnées formed during Pleistocene glaciation, exfoliation joints and panholes.

The highest peaks of the Žulová Hilly Land are:

- Boží hora, 527 m (1,729 ft)
- Vycpálek, 500 m (1,600 ft)
- Borový vrch, 487 m (1,598 ft)
- Kaní hora, 476 m (1,562 ft)
- Hadí vrch, 474 m (1,555 ft)
- Píšťala, 448 m (1,470 ft)
- Hradisko, 437 m (1,434 ft)
- Bukový vrch, 424 m (1,391 ft)
- Lánský vrch, 423 m (1,388 ft)
- Smolný vrch, 404 m (1,325 ft)

== Geology ==
The bedrock is mainly composed of granite and granodiorite. Granite (Czech: žula) was mined here and gave its name to the settlement of Žulová, after which the region is named.

== Geography ==
The Žulová Hilly Land has an area of 107 km^{2} (41 sq mi) and an average elevation of 337 m (1,106 ft).

The Žulová Hilly Land is drained by the Vidnávka (a tributary of the Eastern Neisse). The most populated settlement in the area is Žulová.

== Protection of nature ==
There are no large-scale protected areas. The most valuable areas are the national nature monuments of Borový (with an area of 35.0 ha (86 acres)) and Venušiny misky (with an area of 3.9 ha (10 acres)). Both of these monuments protect rare rock formations formed by the weathering of granite.
