= Albert Theer =

Austrian painter and lithographer (1815–1902)

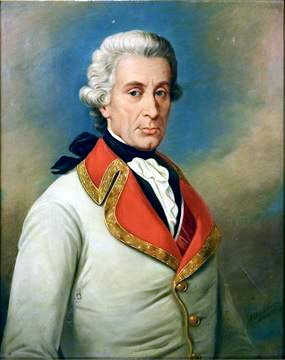
General Ernst Gideon von Laudon (posthumous portrait)

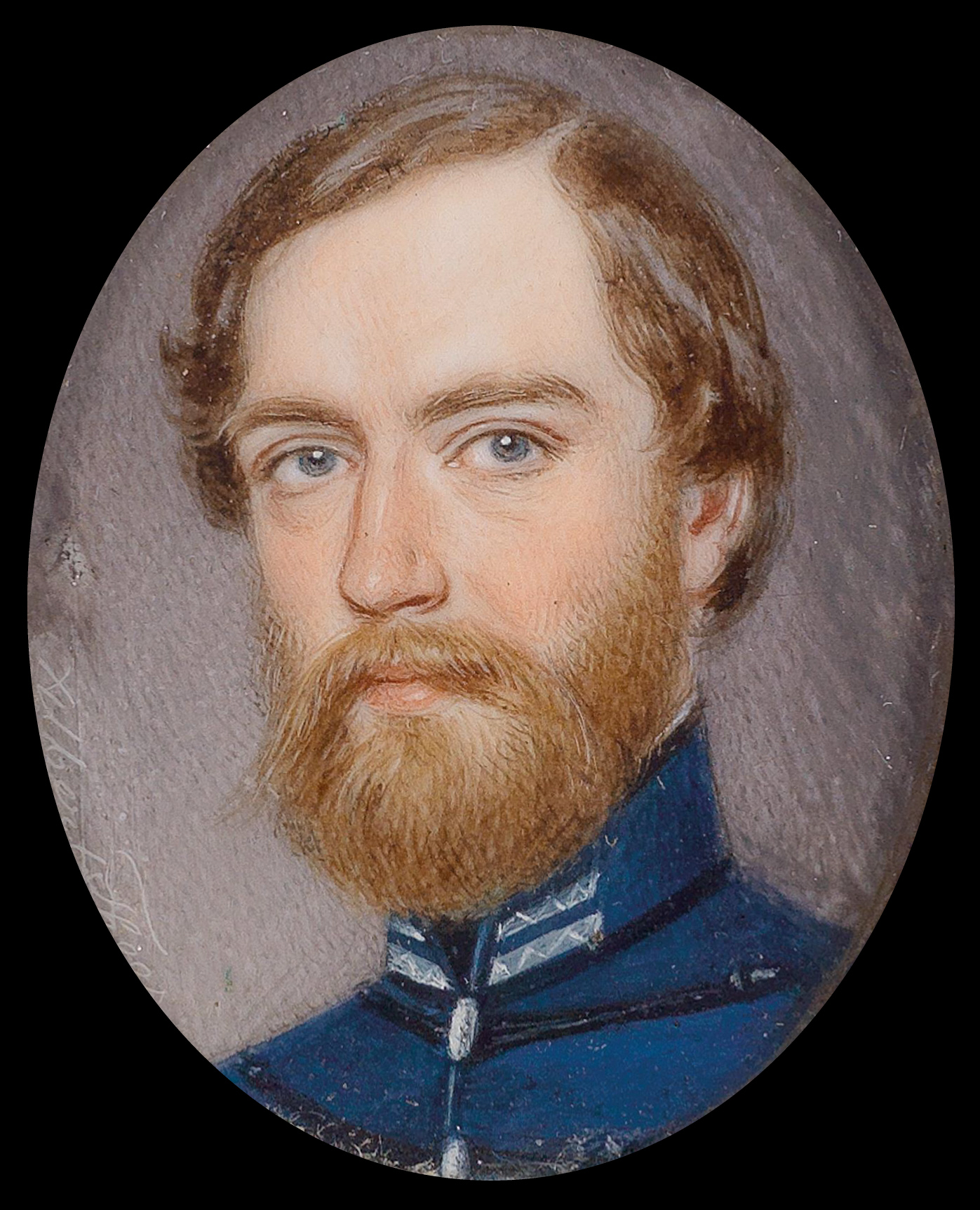
Count Josip Jelačić, as a young Captain (miniature on ivory)

Albert Theer (15 October 1815 – 30 August 1902) was an Austrian portrait painter and lithographer.

== Life and work ==
He was born in Johannesberg to Thekla Theer (née Junker), an embroidery designer, and Joseph Theer, a gemcutter. Both of his brothers, Adolf and Robert, also became painters. In 1820, his family moved from Silesia to Vienna.

From 1827 to 1832, he attended the engraving and metal cutting classes at the Academy of Fine Arts, Vienna. In 1830, he was awarded their Gundel-Prize for excellence. He first took part in one of their exhibitions in 1834. He held his last exhibition, with the Österreichischen Kunstvereins, in 1855.

In 1838, he married Karoline von Perger, a sister of the painter Anton von Perger. They had several children, including Julius Theer, who had a promising career as an artist, but died at an early age of tuberculosis.

He outlived both of his brothers by almost four decades. At the time of his death in Vienna, he was the last living representative of the old Viennese style of miniature painting. He was interred at the Wiener Zentralfriedhof. The "Theergasse" in Vienna's Meidling district was named after him and his brother Robert in 1930.

Most of miniatures were painted in watercolors on ivory. The works of Moritz Michael Daffinger were a major influence. Most of his clientele was private, and a majority of his sitters have not been identified. He also worked as a copyist; reproducing paintings Raphael, Thomas Lawrence and Franz Xaver Winterhalter as lithographs.
