= Imperial Porcelain Factory =

Imperial Porcelain Factory may refer to:

- Jingdezhen porcelain, Chinese imperial porcelain factories were located there from the 14th century
- Vienna porcelain (Kaiserlich privilegierte Porcellain Fabrique), 1718 to 1864
- Imperial Porcelain Factory, Saint Petersburg, 1744 to date (under different names 1917 to 2005)
- Yıldız Palace, Istanbul, home of the Turkish Imperial Porcelain Factory or "Yıldız Porcelain Factory", 1890s to present
