= Robert Theer =

Austrian painter and lithographer (1808–1863)

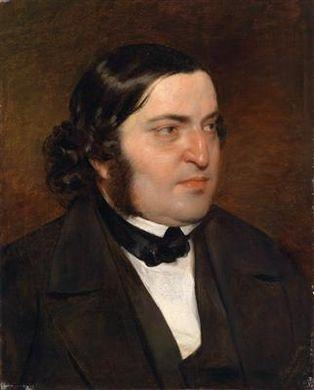
Robert Theer; portrait by Friedrich von Amerling (1845)

Robert Theer (5 November 1808, Johannesberg – 15 July 1863, Vienna) was a painter and lithographer from the Austrian Empire. He is primarily remembered as a miniaturist.

== Life and work ==
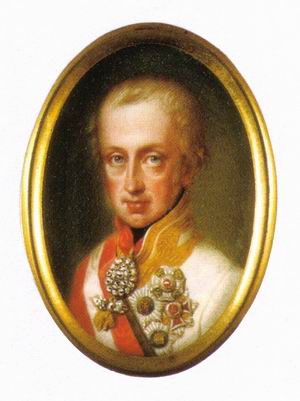
Ferdinand I

He was born to Thekla Theer (née Junker), an embroidery designer, and Joseph Theer, a gemcutter. Both of his younger brothers, Adolf and Albert, also became painters. In 1820, his family moved from Silesia to Vienna. He displayed a talent for drawing at an early age, and was sent to the Academy of Fine Arts, Vienna. There, he attended the engraving school from 1821 to 1824, and was tutored by Josef Klieber. From 1823 to 1829, he studied history painting.

He eventually specialized in portrait miniatures and was influenced by Moritz Michael Daffinger. By the age of sixteen, he opened his own studio. He soon attracted an upper-class clientele. He exhibited at the academy from 1828, and became a member there in 1843. The painter, Gustav Gaul, was one of his students.

His portraits, mostly done on vitreous enamel and ivory, numbered in the thousands. Occasionally, he would recreate the portraits as lithographs. A notable instance is that of the Emperor Ferdinand I, whose face was reproduced on over 150 snuff boxes. He also made copies of the Old Masters.

His earnings were spent on acquiring a private art collection and acting as a patron to his underemployed artist friends. For example, he commissioned the engraver, Joseph Steinmüller (1795–1841) to create an intricate copy of the "Madonna del Prato" by Raphael. The increasing popularity of the daguerreotype decreased his income, however, and left him unable to meet his obligations. He attempted to counter this trend by changing his style and introducing non-realistic elements, but this failed to slow his gradual impoverishment.

He died at the age of fifty-four and was buried in the Wiener Zentralfriedhof.

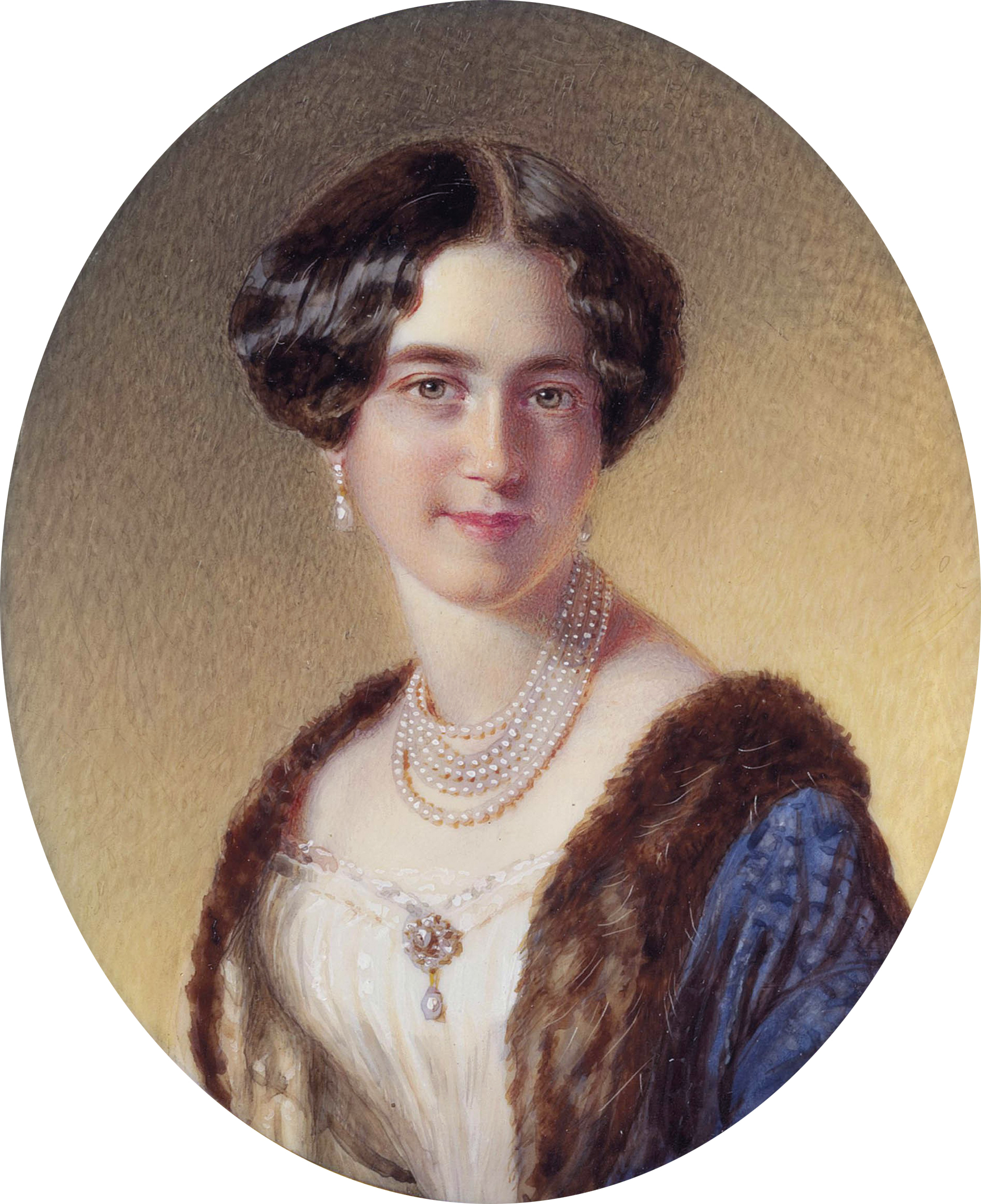
Archduchess Maria Karoline of Austria
