= Marton Museum =

Museum in Croatia

Coordinates: 45°48′01″N 15°42′34″E

Marton Museum (Muzej Marton)
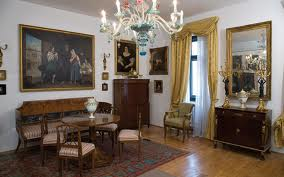
- Established: 2003
- Location: Croatia
- Director: Veljko Marton
- Website: www.muzej-marton.hr

The Marton Museum is Croatia's first private museum and specializes in 18th and 19th century European applied art. The Marton Museum derives its name from its original founder, Veljko Marton, whose collection is featured within its walls.

== History ==
Veljko Marton held the first exhibit of his personal art collection at Zagreb's Museum of Arts and Crafts in the fall of 2002. In the end over 700 works were presented to the public as part of the show. The exhibition was deemed a success and subsequently led to the idea of opening up a permanent museum to house the collection. The resulting Marton Museum subsequently opened its doors in Samobor, a town located on the outskirts of Zagreb. The official opening was held on 18 May 2003, a date which coincided with that year's International Museum Day.

The museum has held numerous exhibitions throughout Croatia and has also exhibited internationally. In June 2008, the Marton Museum held its first exhibition on British soil at the Croatian Embassy in downtown London. In February 2009 the Marton Museum went on to exhibit selected pieces at the Sèvres - Cité de la céramique on the outskirts of Paris. In the summer of 2010 the Marton Museum organized its first exhibit in Austria at Vienna's Liechtenstein Museum. That same winter the museum organized its first Italian exhibit in Venice at the Pinacoteca Querini Stampalia.

In early 2011 the Marton Museum announced that it was expanding to the city of Zagreb, with its new home being the historic Kulmer Palace in the city's Gornji Grad quarter (Old Town). The grand opening was held on 18 March 2011. It has since moved back to its original location in Samobor.

== The collection ==
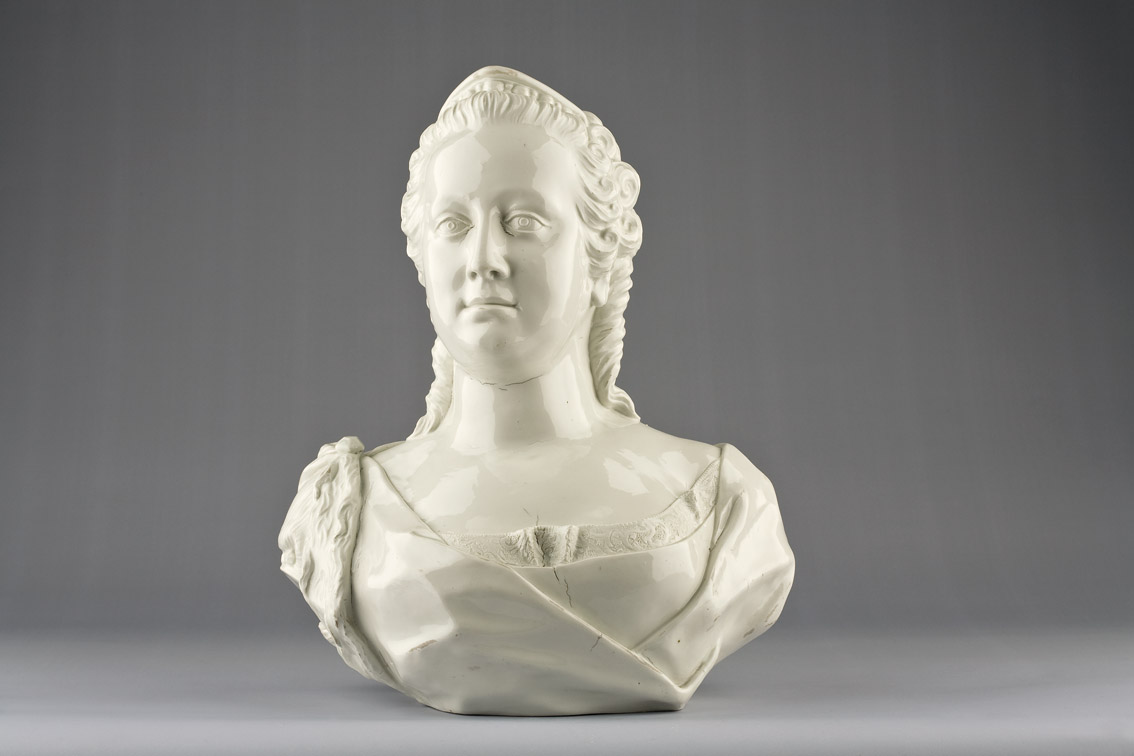
Glazed Vienna porcelain bust of the Empress Maria Theresa

The museum's collection counts a number of silver and glass pieces, along with various paintings and furniture pieces, yet it perhaps bears mention that the museum is particularly known for its European porcelain. The Marton Collection features pieces from many well known and historic manufacturers including Meissen and Sèvres, among others. Vienna porcelain is particularly well represented, with numerous pieces ranging from the early Du Paquier period to the later Sorgenthal period. The depth of the collection in this area is such that one can easily trace the evolution of tastes and decorative styles of the aristocracy who bought these pieces over the decades, from early Chinese influenced floral patterns to later painted depictions of European landscapes and gilded neoclassical motifs.

Many of the porcelain pieces enjoy a royal provenance and are directly related to the European regency who could afford these luxuries at the time. For example, among the many pieces of historic Russian porcelain contained within the collection, there exist plates that were commissioned by Catherine the Great for both the St. Alexander Nevsky and St. Vladimir Order service, another plate that was made for the wedding of Duke Constantin Nikolayevich (son of Tsar Nicholas I), as well a glass cooler that was made for the Grand Duchess of Catherine Pavlova as part of her dowry for her marriage to Prince Peter Friedrich Georg Oldenburg, among others.
