= Adolf Theer =

Austrian painter and lithographer (1811–1868)

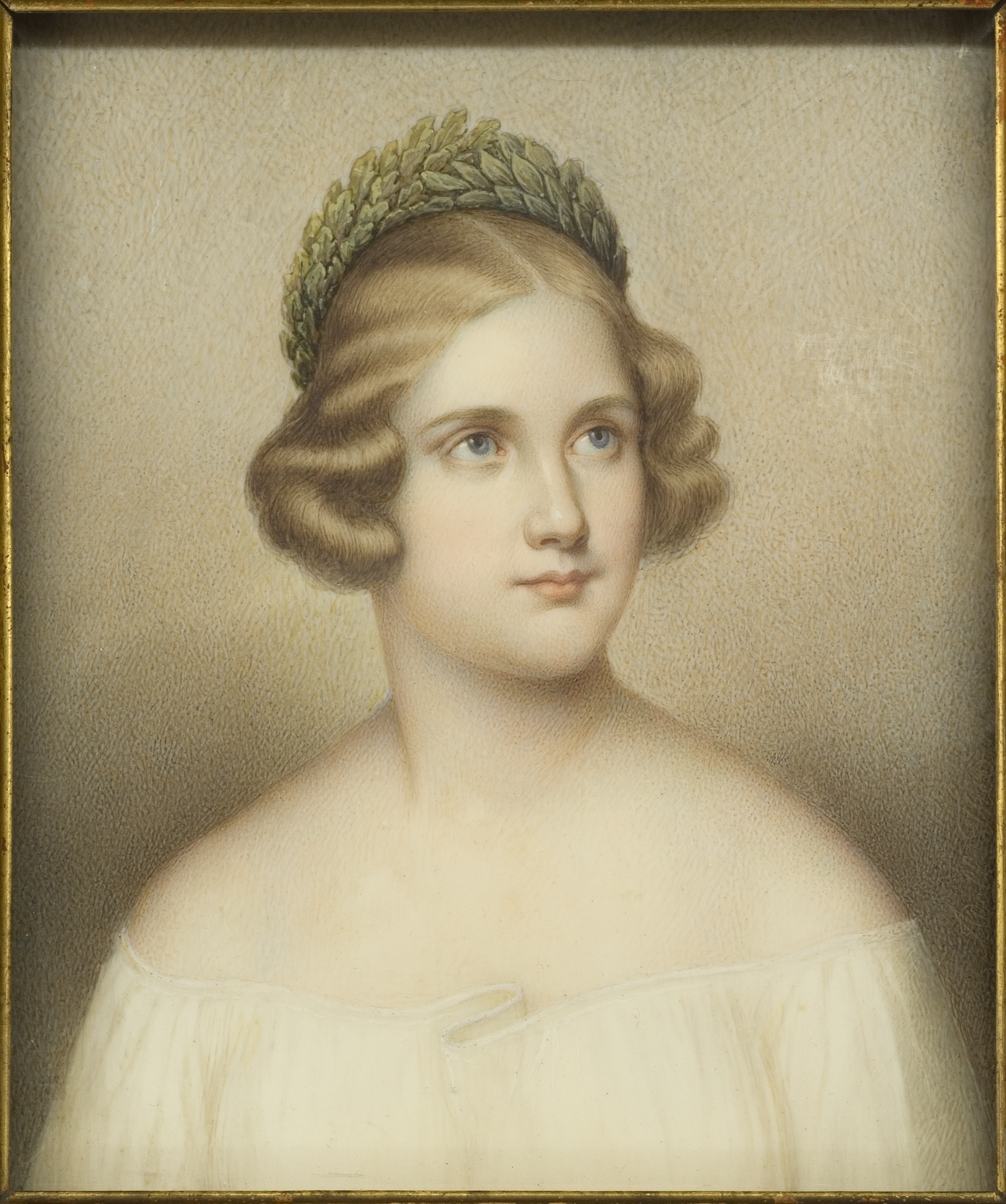
Portrait of the singer Jenny Lind

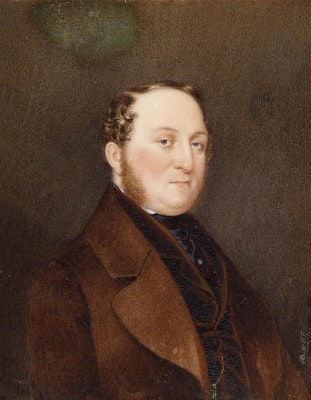
An Obese Man in a Brown Suit (self-portrait?, 1846)

Adolf Theer (2 May 1811, Johannesberg – 23 April 1868, Vienna) was an Austrian portrait painter and lithographer.

== Life and work ==
He was born to Thekla Theer (née Junker), an embroidery designer, and Joseph Theer, a gemcutter. Both of his brothers, Albert and Robert, also became painters. In 1820, his family moved from Silesia to Vienna.

From 1827 to 1830, he studied engraving at the Academy of Fine Arts, Vienna. For a year, he studied history painting. After graduating, from 1832 to 1848, his works were among those most frequently seen at the Academy's exhibitions. In January of 1852, he had a major showing with the Österreichischer Kunstverein. Most of his clientele came from the upper middle-class.

He died from gout at the age of fifty-six.

Watercolors were his primary medium, and he specialized in miniature portraits for most of his career. He also worked as a copyist, recreating works by Caravaggio, Domenichino, Thomas Lawrence, Murillo, Raphael and Philip van Dijk. As a lithographer, he produced portraits of notable people such as the actress Luise Neumann, and Napoleon Franz Bonaparte, as a child.

In addition to his artworks, he created illustrations for popular almanacs and paperbacks, including Aurora and Gedenke mein (My Memories), by Johann Gabriel Seidl, and Huldigung der Frauen (Homage to Women) by Ignaz Franz Castelli, although his depictions of women were generally considered to be mechanical and expressionless.
