= Porcelain Museum (Florence) =

Ceramics museum in Italy

Coordinates: 43°45′43.20″N 11°15′9.02″E

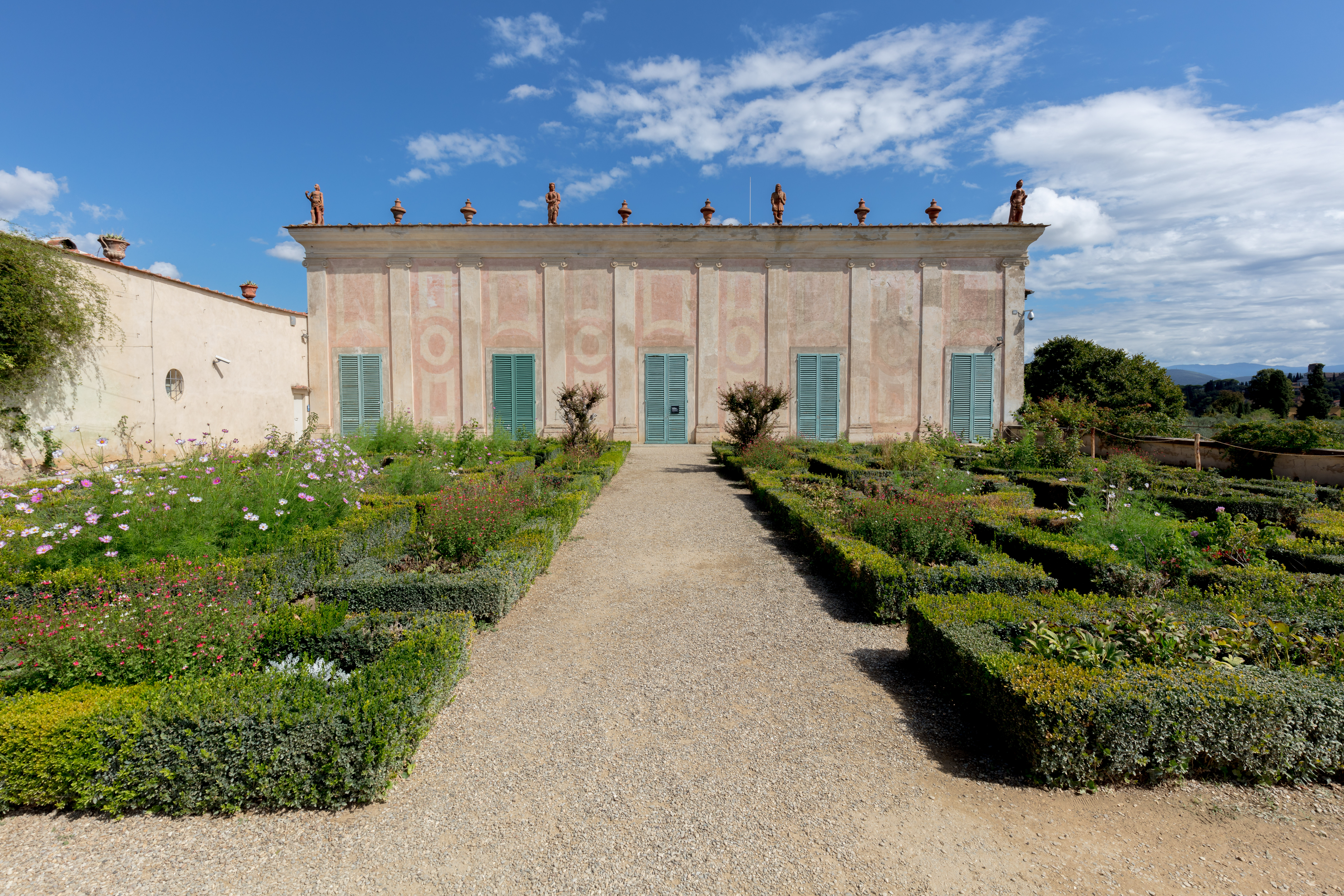
The Museo delle Porcellane in Florence, Italy.

The Porcelain Museum (Italian: Museo delle porcellane) is located in the Casino del Cavaliere, one of the highest points of the Boboli Gardens at the Pitti Palace in Florence, Italy.

The items on display, organized by manufacturer in the displays, include examples from the leading European producers. Among the largest holdings on display are: the Capodimonte porcelain of Naples; the Tuscan Doccia porcelain from Sesto Fiorentino; French manufacturers such as Sèvres and Vincennes; Vienna porcelain, largely collected by Ferdinand III of Tuscany; the German porcelain factory of Meissen.

The museum is among the hundred most visited art museums in the world.

== History ==
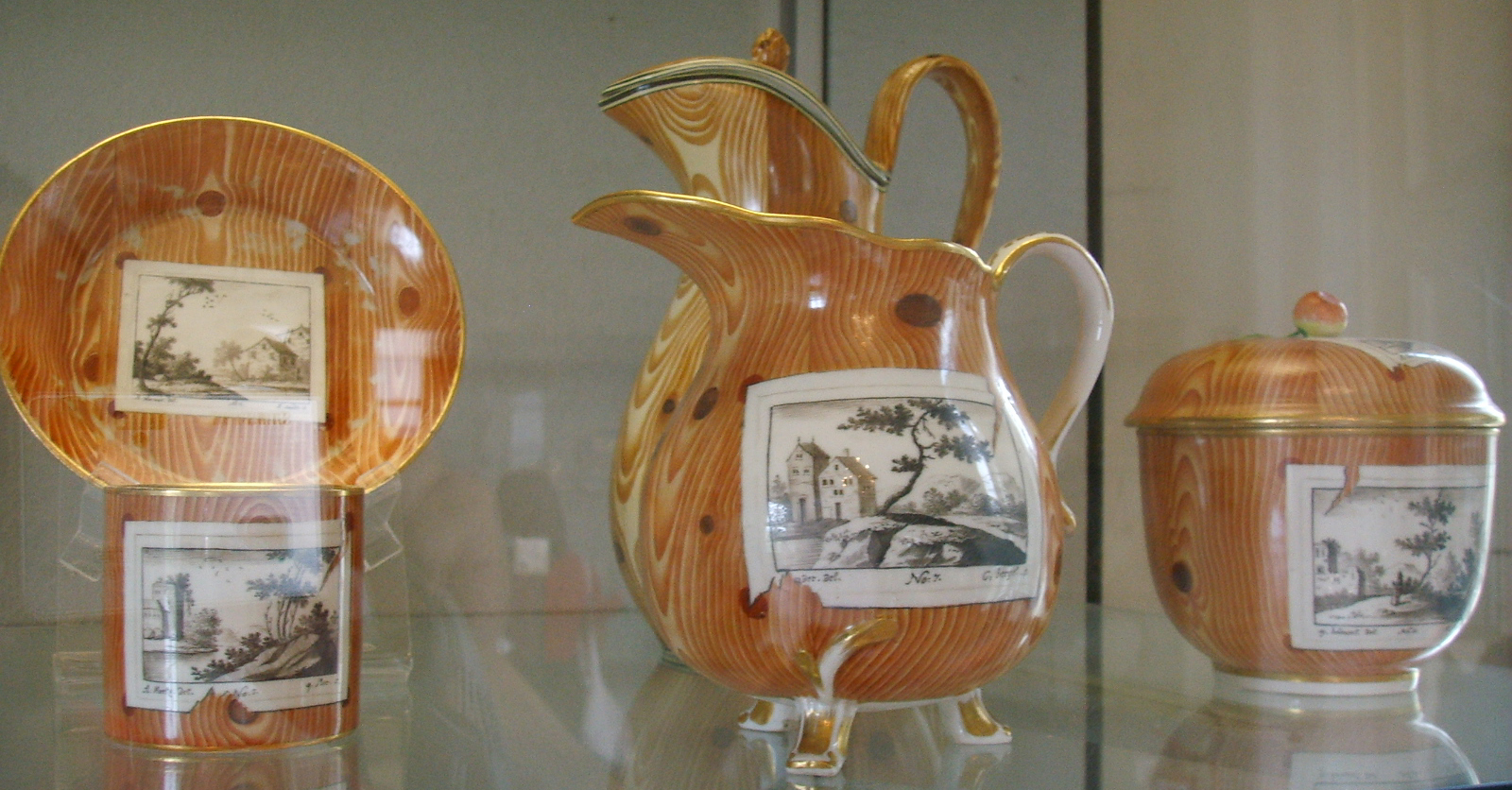
Vienna porcelain, "wood" decor

The museum, housed in the Villino del Cavaliere high in the Boboli Gardens, was opened in October 1973, after more than three years of research on the collections by Dr. Svend Eriksen (French Porcelain in particular) and Sheila K. Tabakoff who, under the auspices of a CRIA Grant, worked with Dr. Kirsten Piacenti, Director of the Museo degli Argenti, in realizing her dream for this collection. Numbering over 2000 pieces, the collection reflects the vicissitudes of the rulers of Florence over a period of some 250 years, from the last days of the Medici rule through the Unification of Italy. It comprises one of the most important historical collections of its kind in Europe. Over the years, various publications of parts of this collection have been produced, largely by Centro Di in Florence. Authors of these include Svend Eriksen, Sheila K. Tabakoff, Andreina d'Agliano and Tim Clarke, all noted ceramics scholars.

== Gallery ==
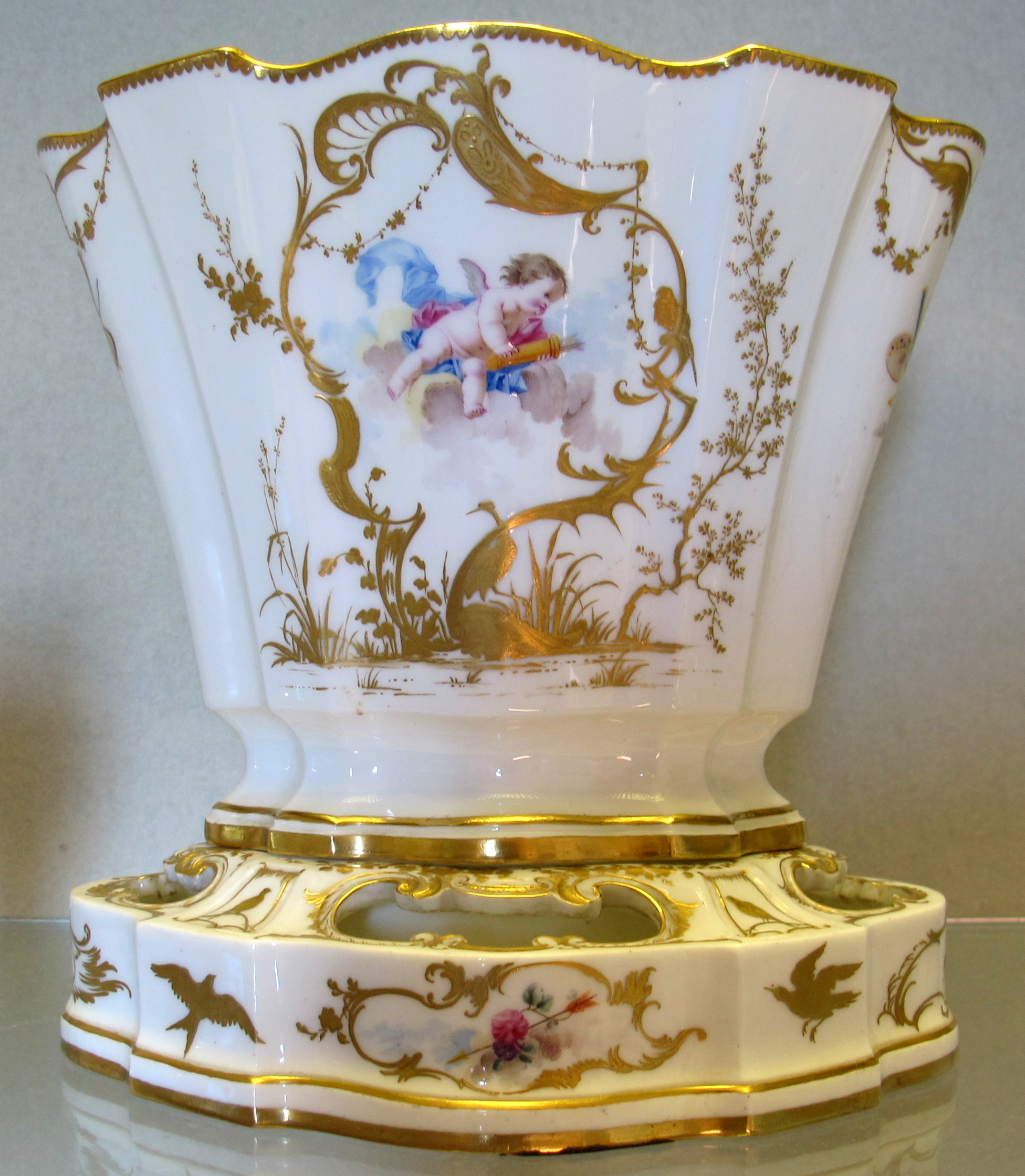
Vincennes porcelain, planter, 1750-56

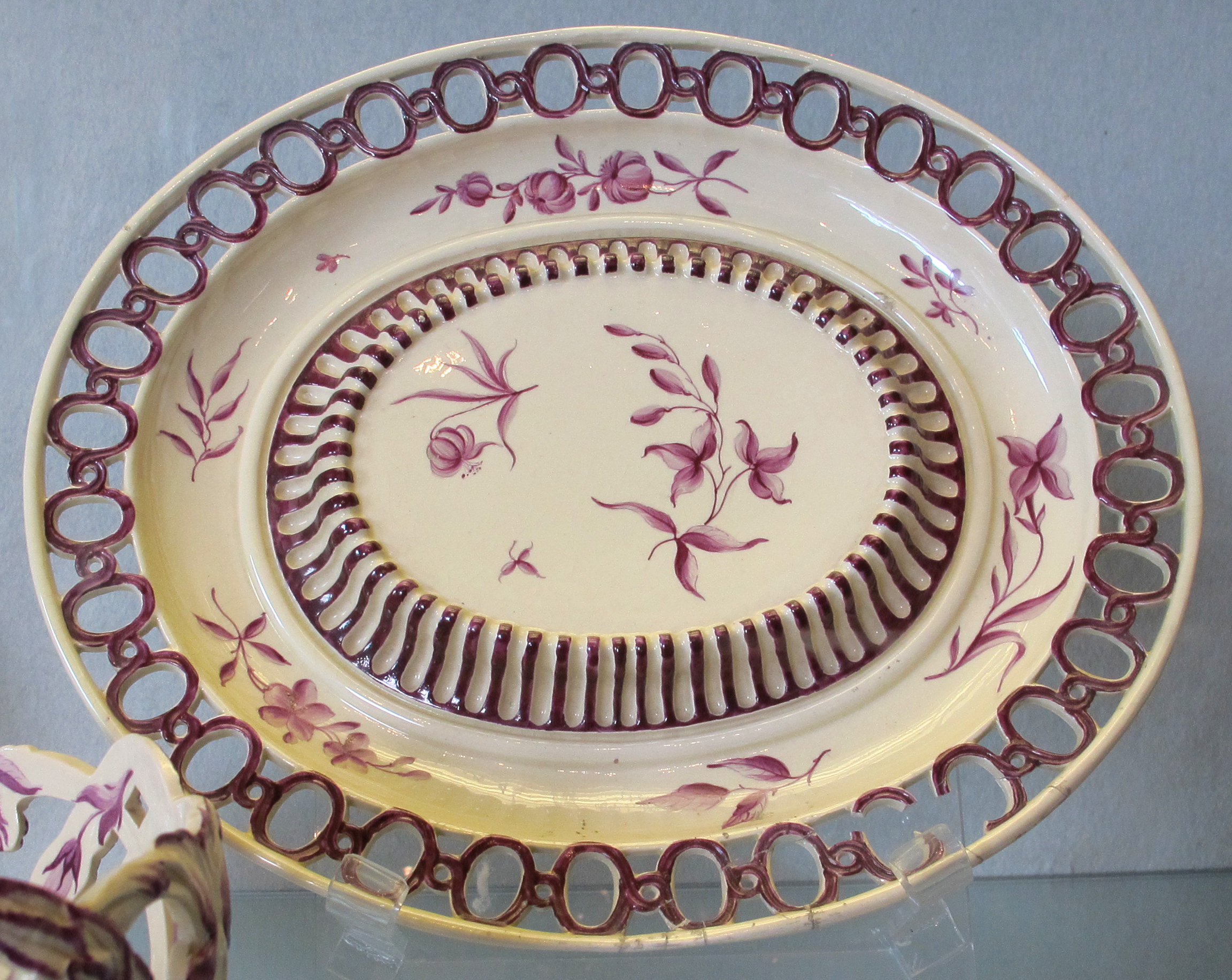
Wedgwood creamware dish, c. 1770

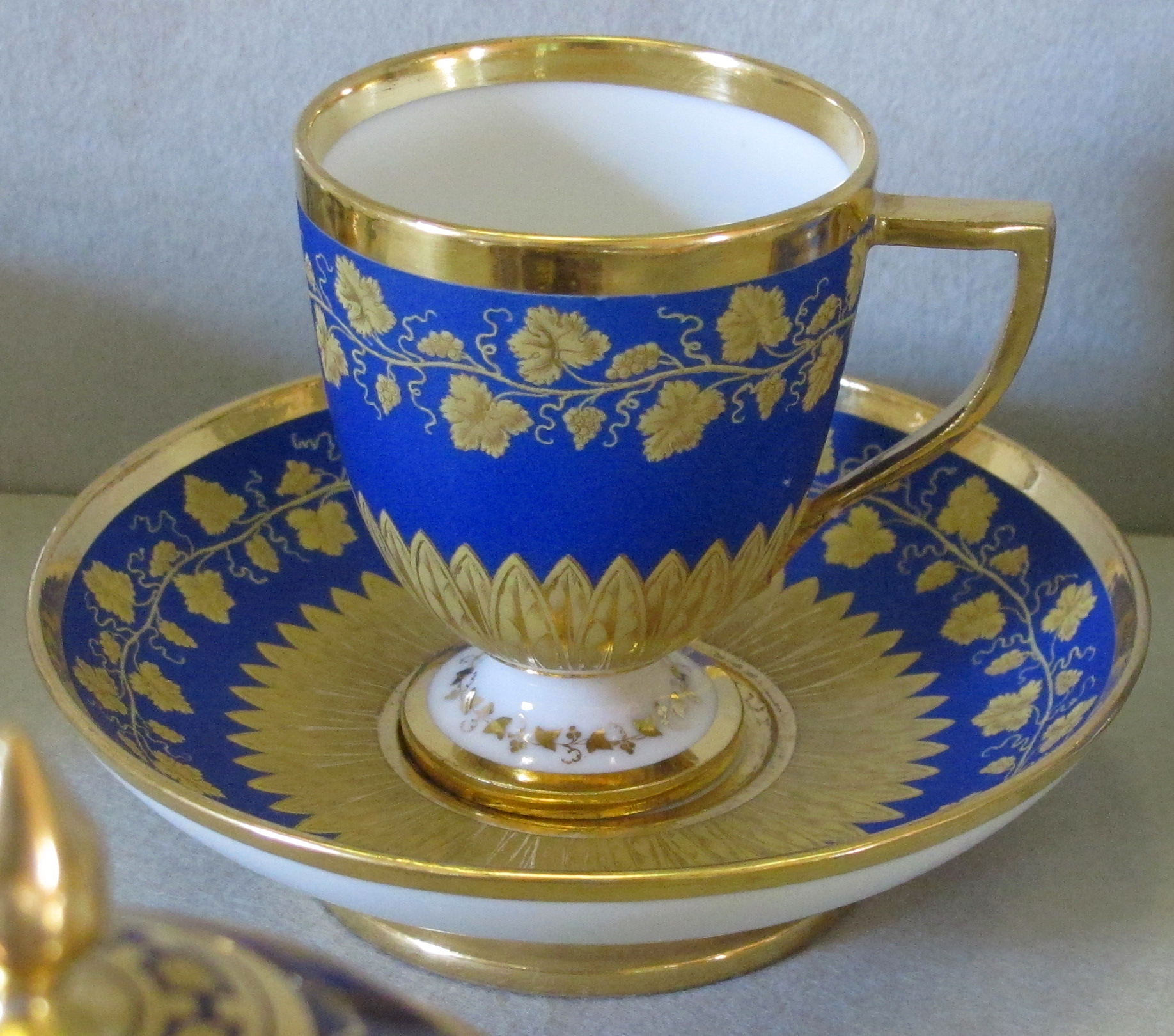
Cup by Dagoty, Paris, c. 1810

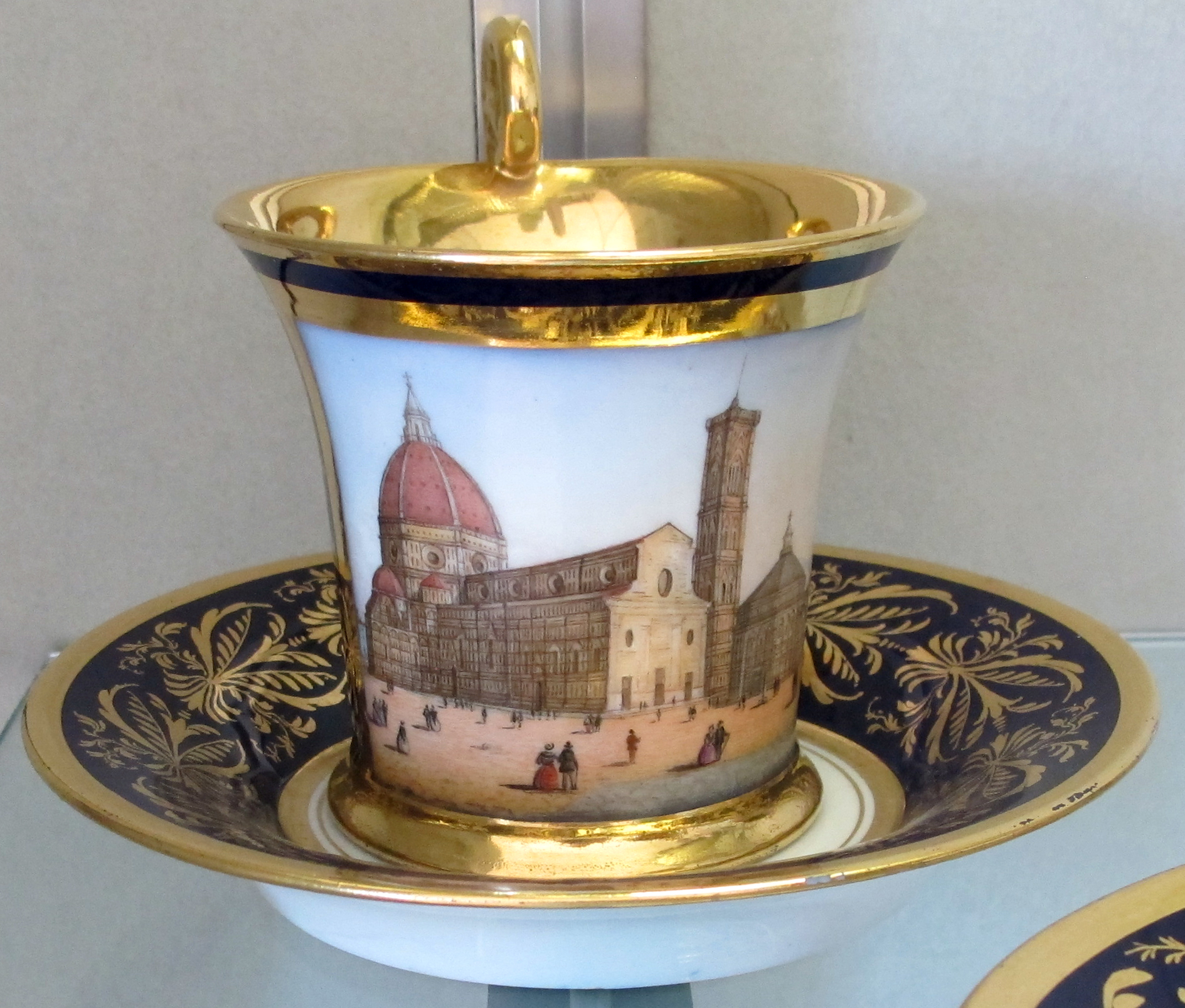
Doccia porcelain, service with views of Florence, early 19th-century

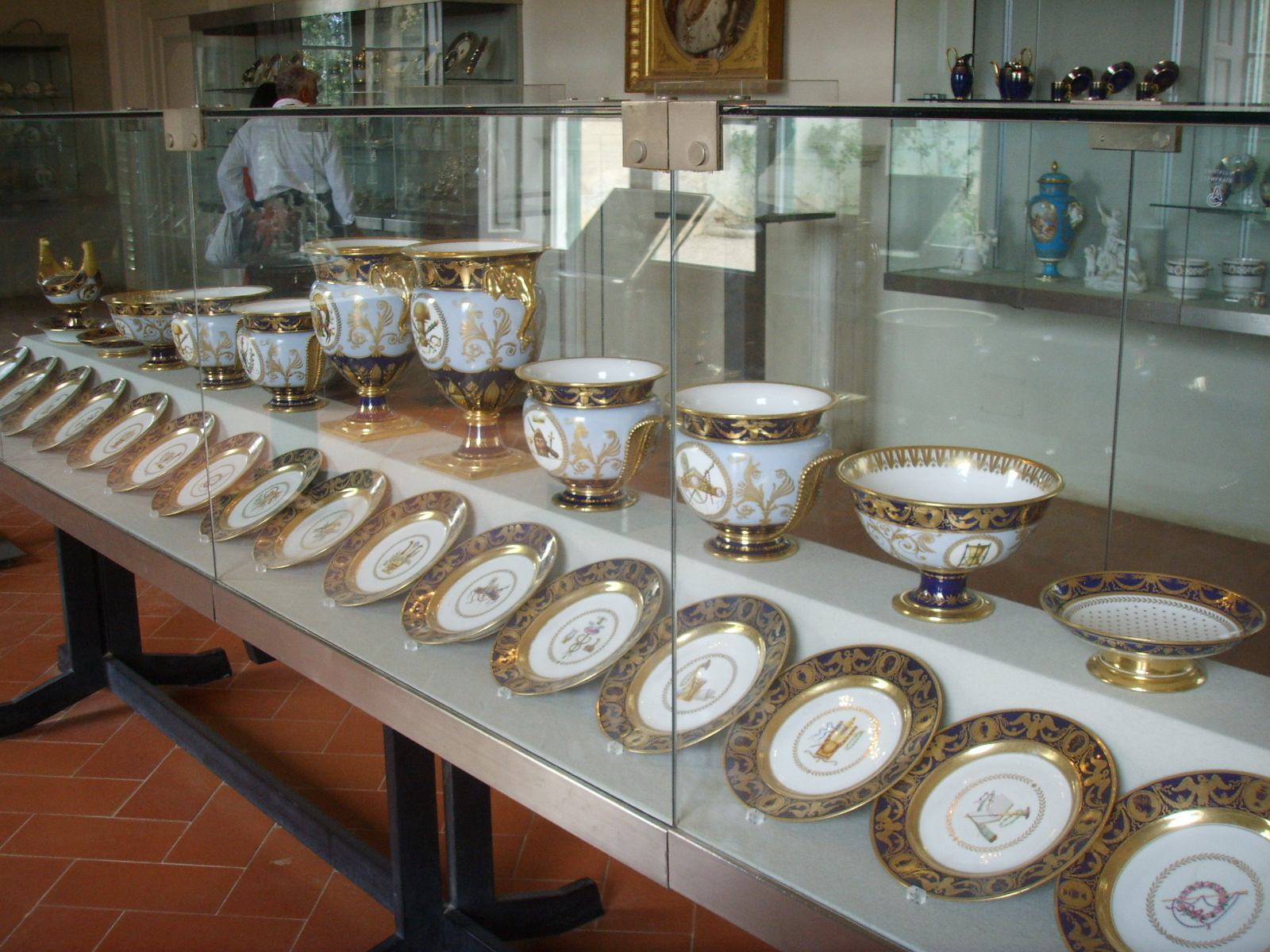
Sèvres porcelain of Elisa Baciocchi (1809–1810).

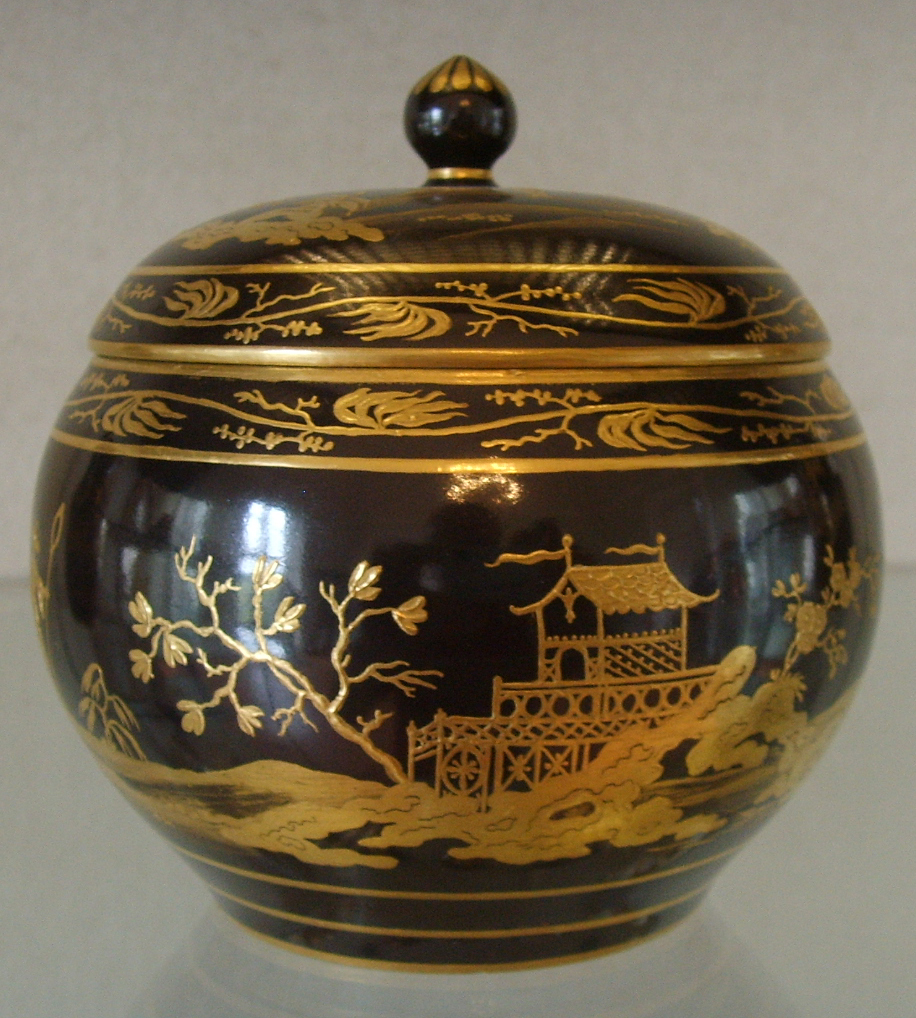
Vienna porcelain, sugar bowl (1799),

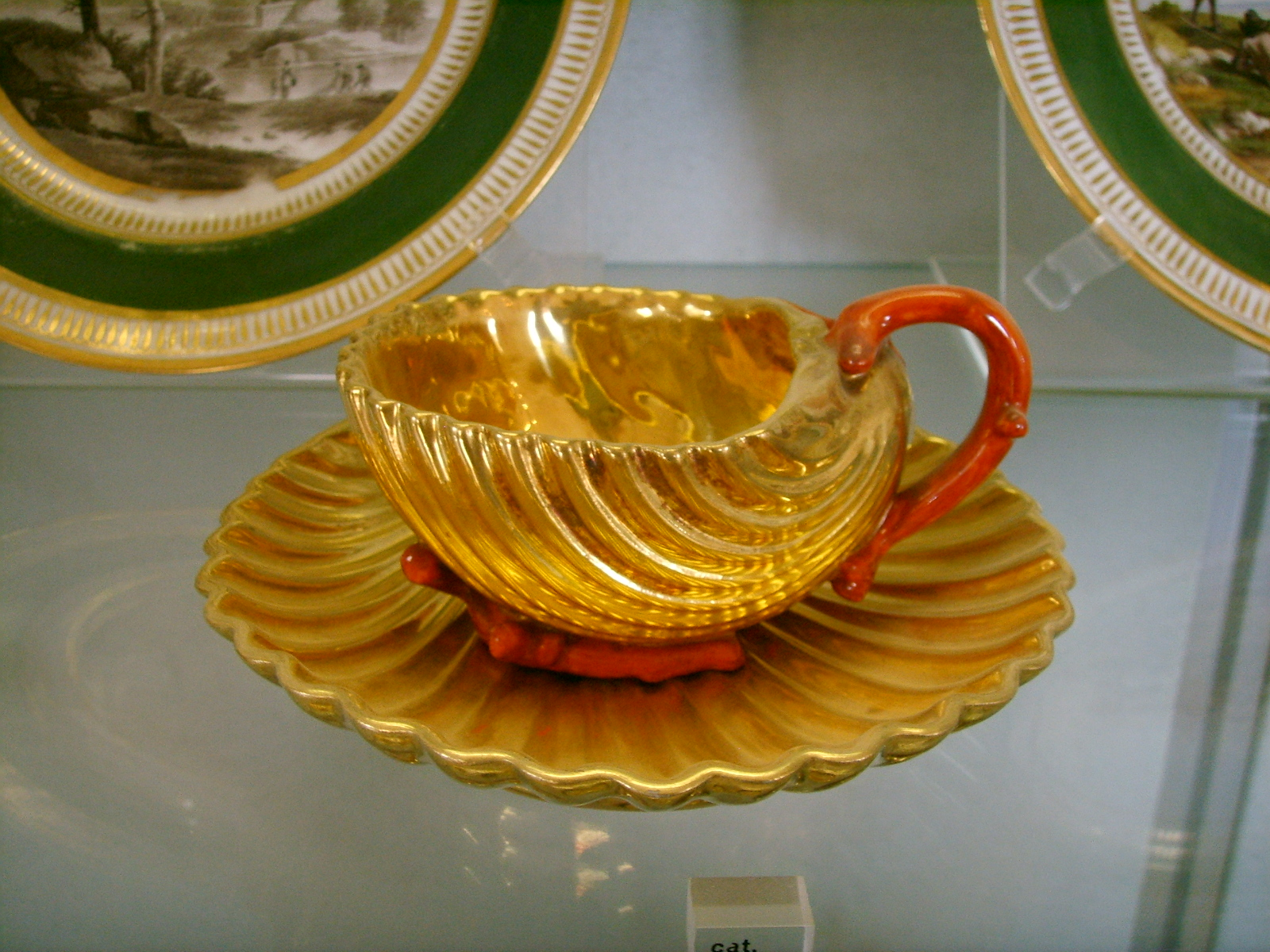
Shell-shaped cup.

== See also ==
- List of most-visited art museums
