= Moritz Daffinger =

Austrian artist (1790–1849)

Moritz Michael Daffinger
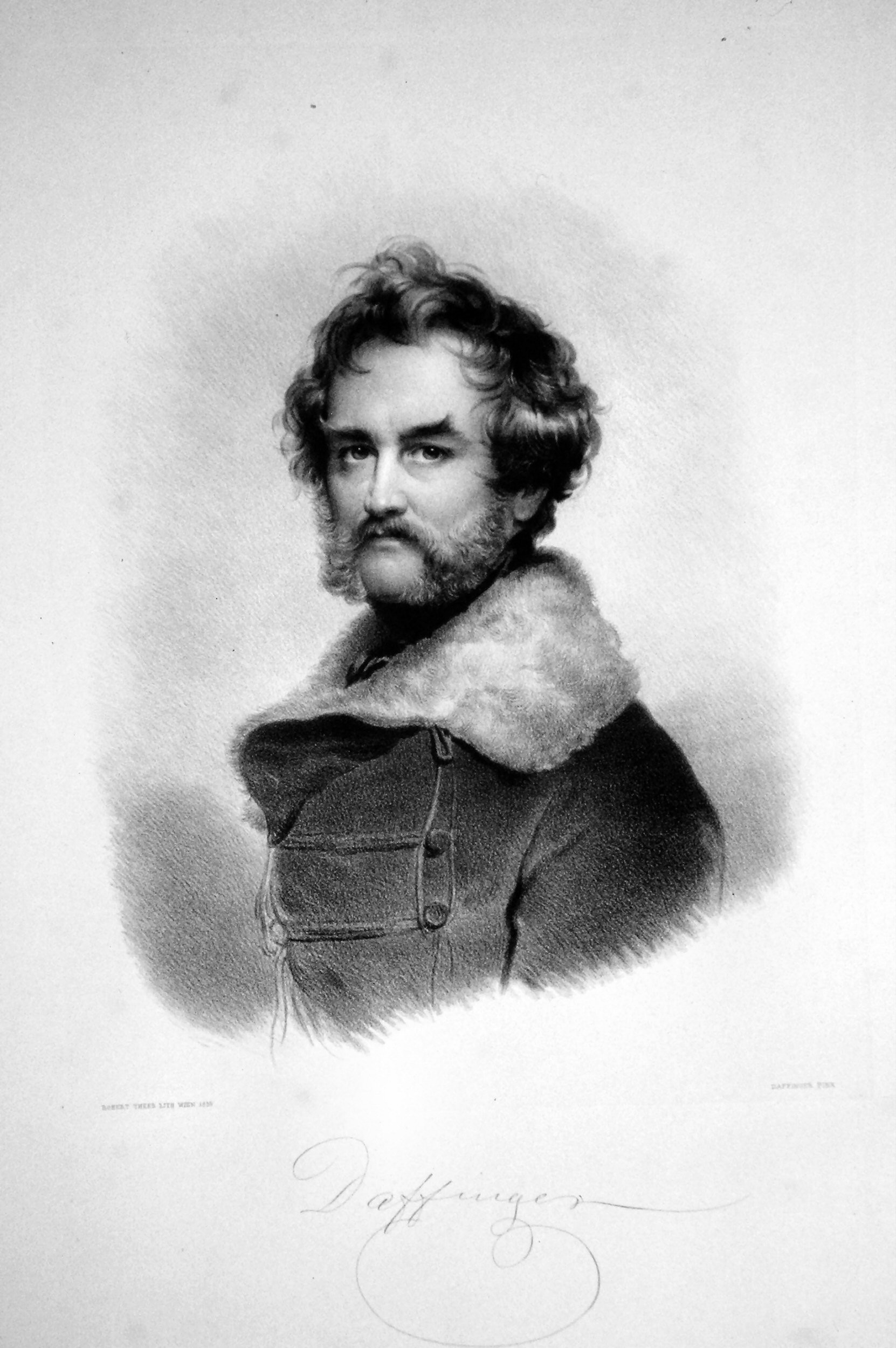
- Lithograph by Robert Theer, 1856
- Born: 25 January 1790; Lichtental, Austria, Holy Roman Empire
- Died: 21 August 1849 (aged 59); Vienna, Austrian Empire
- Known for: Miniature painting, sculpture
- Father: Johann Daffinger

Moritz Michael Daffinger (25 January 1790 – 21 August 1849) was an Austrian miniature painter and sculptor.

== Life ==
Daffinger was born in Vienna on 25 January 1790. He was the son of Johann Daffinger (1748–1796), a painter at the local Vienna Porcelain Manufactory. The eleven-year-old likewise was accepted as an apprentice and later went on to study at the Academy of Fine Arts, where he took painting lessons with Heinrich Füger. He returned to work at the factory as one of its leading painters.

From 1809 he worked only on portraits, specializing in miniature painting on ivory, and small gouaches on paper. In 1812, he was employed as a portraitist by the Austrian Foreign Minister, Klemens von Metternich, and became curator of the extensive portrait collection of Metternich's third wife, Princess Melanie.

In 1819, he painted a portrait of Metternich's daughter, Klementine, posed as the goddess Hebe. He was influenced by Jean-Baptiste Isabey and even more strongly by the English portrait painter Thomas Lawrence, who visited Vienna in 1819. In his late years, he concentrated on the painting of flowers.

Daffinger died on 21 August 1849 during a cholera epidemic in Vienna and was buried in the St. Marx Cemetery. In 1912, his remains were transferred to a grave of honor (German: Ehrengrab) in the Vienna Zentralfriedhof. Daffinger left more than a thousand portraits, many of which were owned by the Austrian imperial House of Habsburg-Lorraine.

His portrait graced the obverse of the Austrian 20-schilling banknote that circulated until the introduction of the euro in 1999.

== Gallery ==
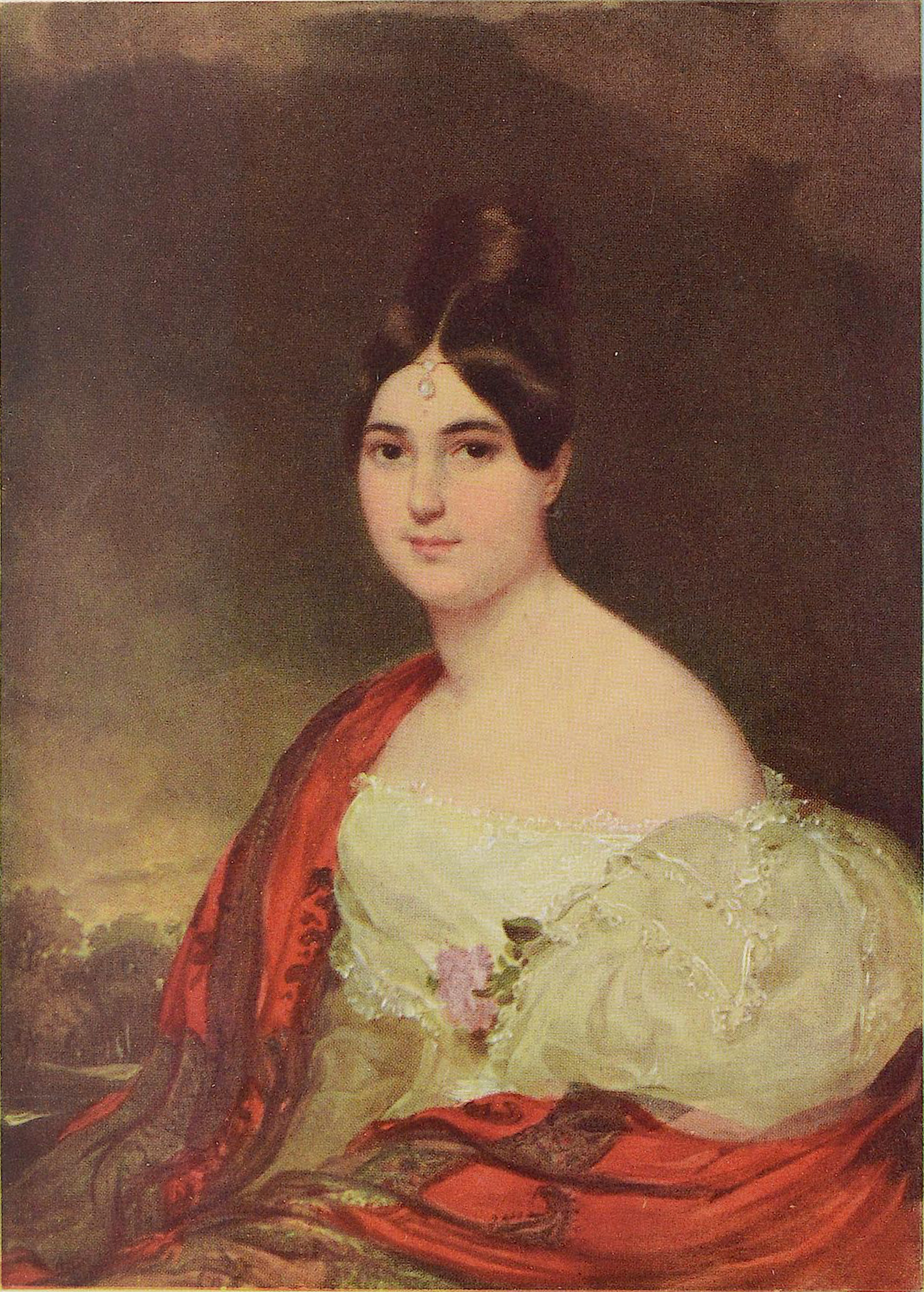
Portrait of the Artists' Wife

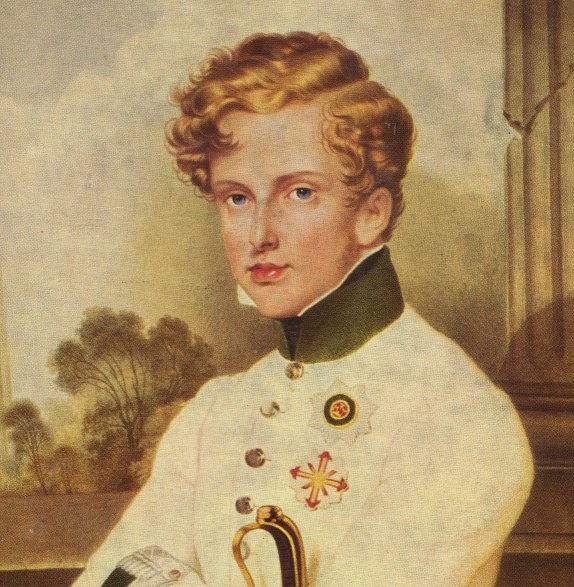
Napoleon II, from a postcard

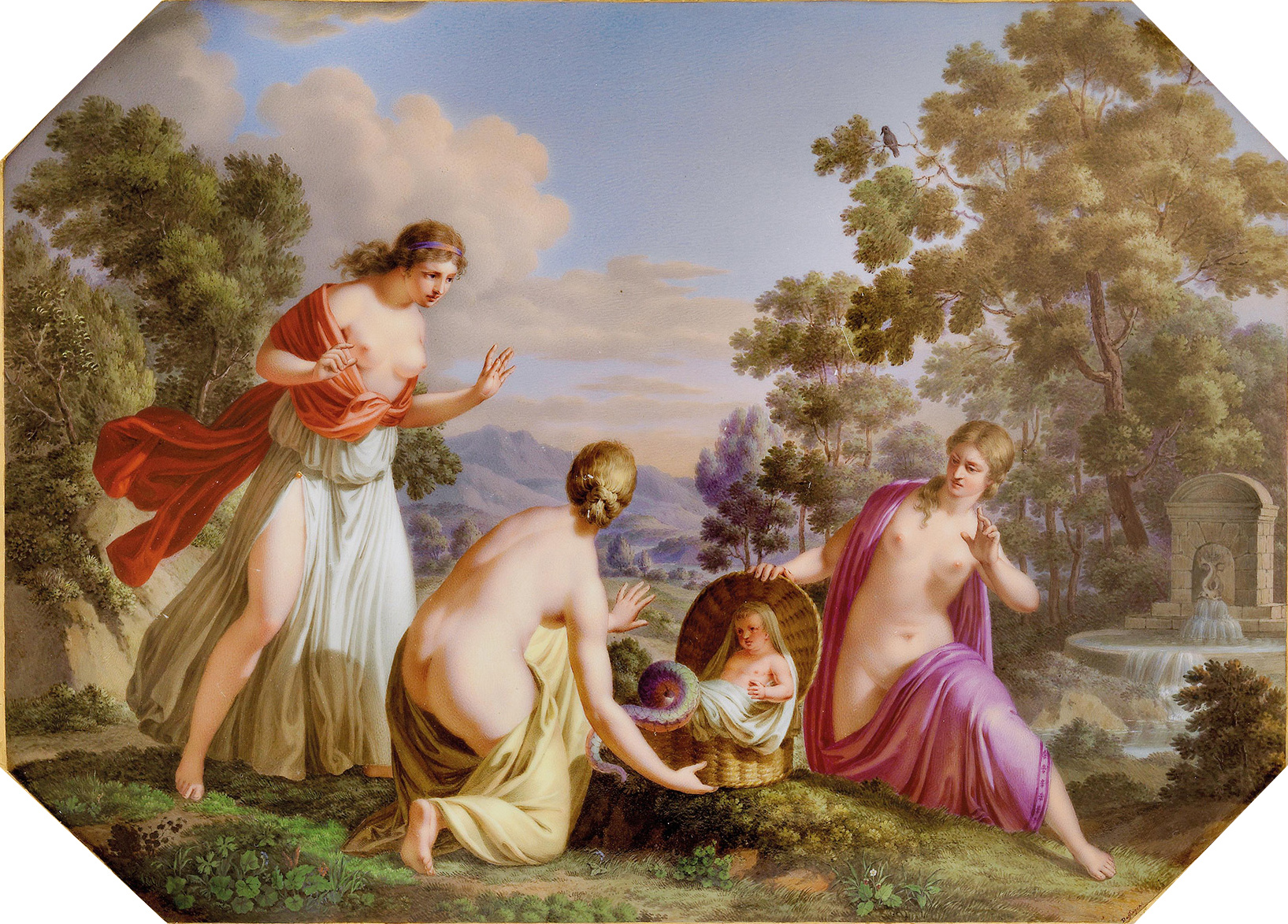
Detail from a Vienna porcelain tray painted by Daffinger, after 1808, Cecrops' Daughters Discover Erichtonius

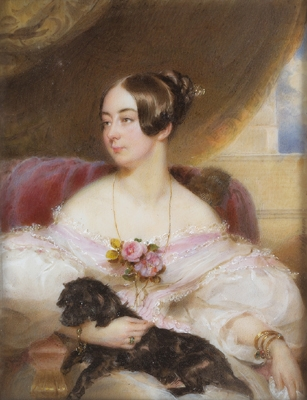
Portrait of Countess Ferdinandine Karolyi, c. 1840

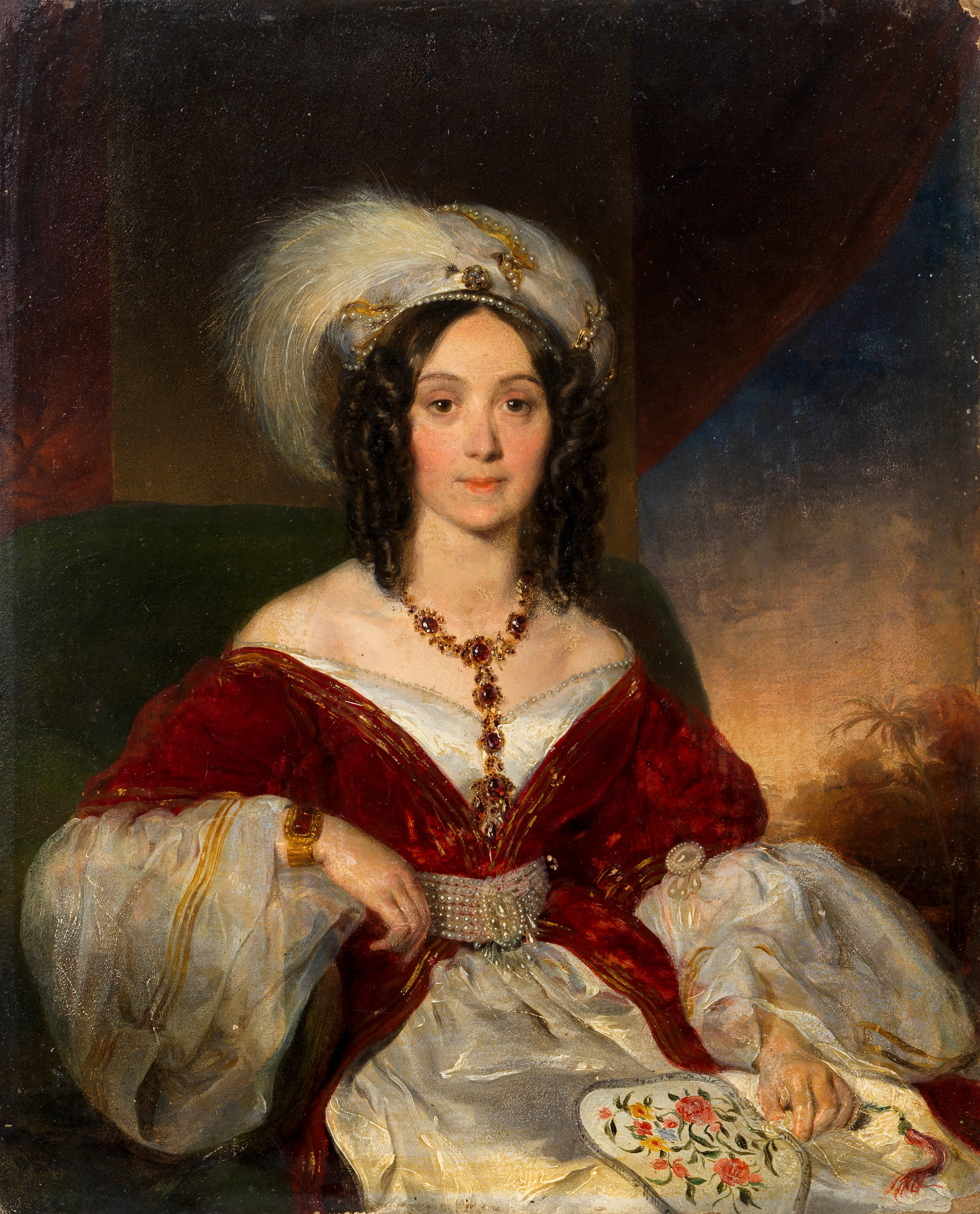
Portrait of Princess Joanna of Courland, c. 1820

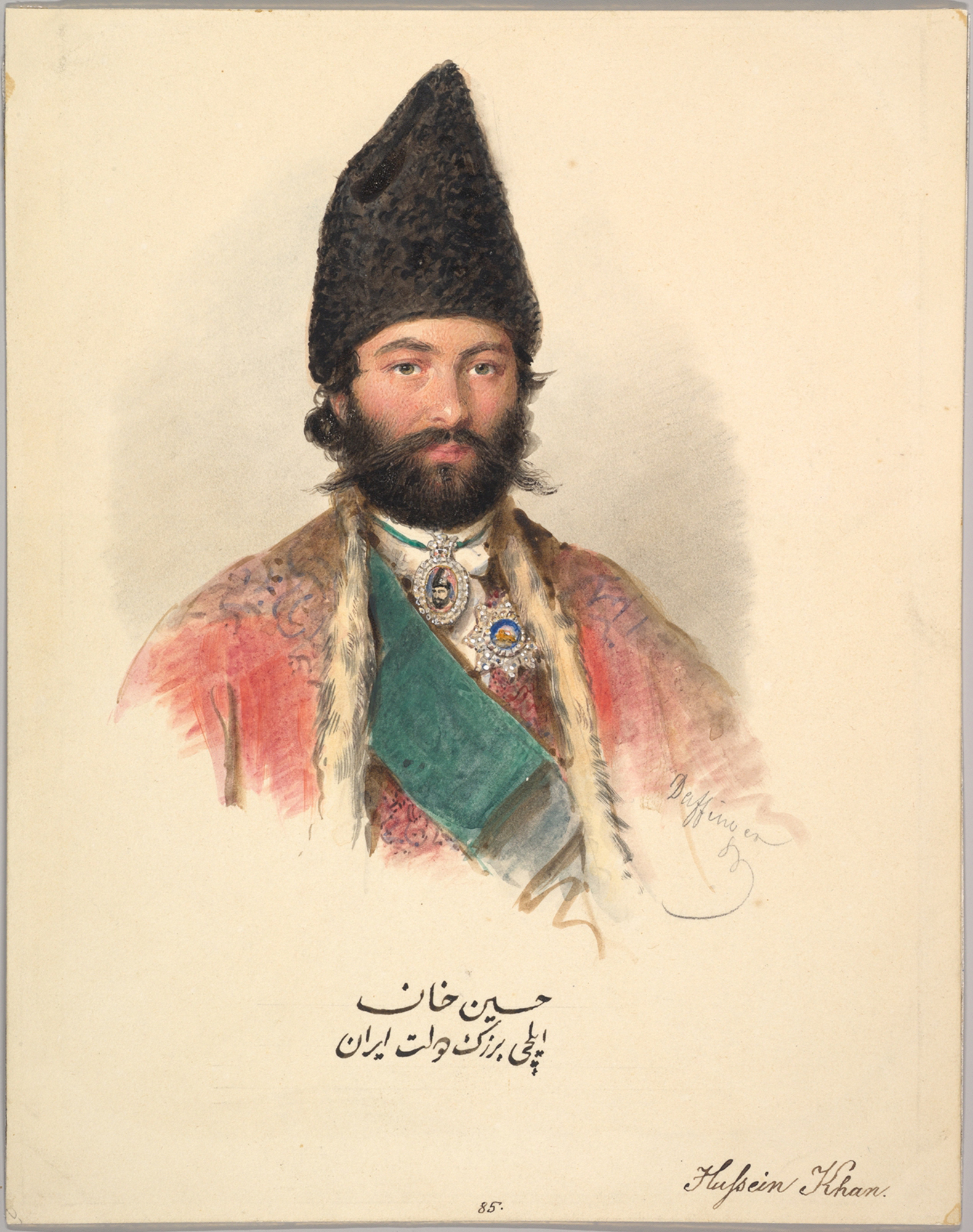
Portrait of Hossein Khan Ajudanbashi (1839)

== Sources ==
- Frodl-Schneemann, Marianne (2003). "Daffinger, Moritz Michael". Grove Art Online.
