= Vienna porcelain =

Defunct Austrian porcelain manufacturer

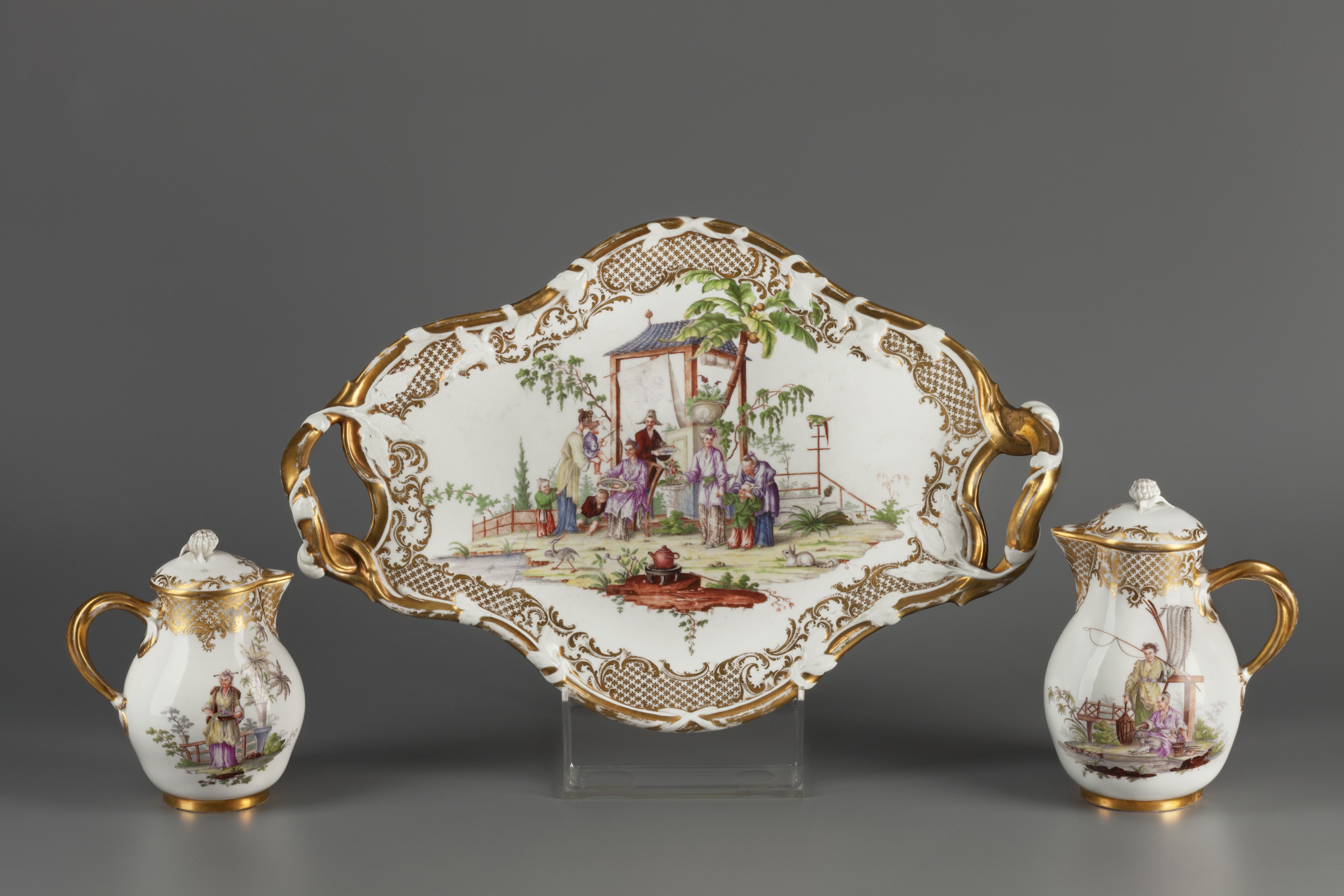
Service set - a tray and two jugs, c. 1770. National Museum in Warsaw

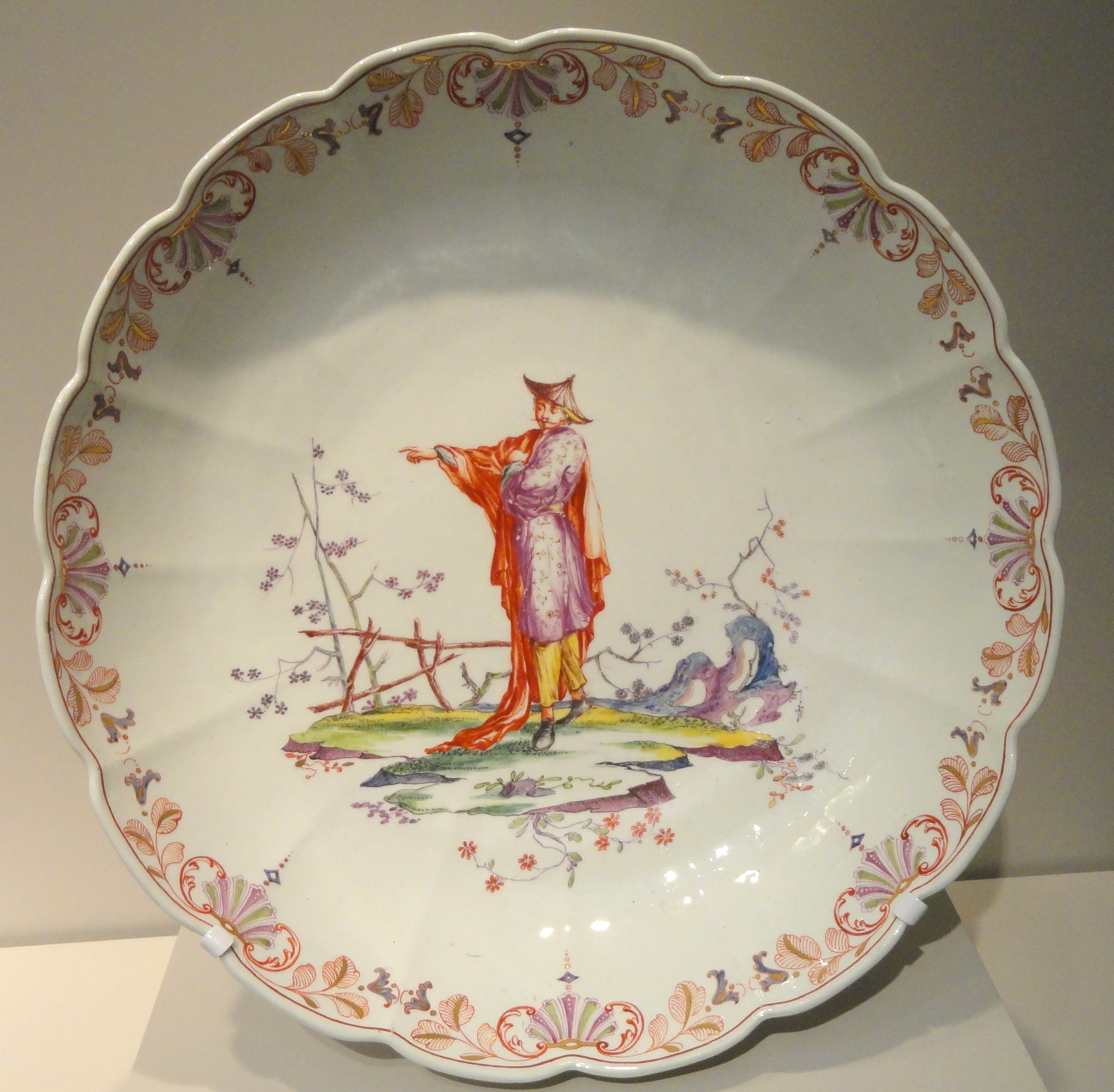
Chinoiserie plate, 1730–1735, Du Paquier period

Vienna porcelain is the product of the Vienna Porcelain Manufactory (German: Kaiserlich privilegierte Porcellain Fabrique), a porcelain manufacturer in Alsergrund in Vienna, Austria. It was founded in 1718 and continued until 1864.

The firm was Europe's second-oldest porcelain factory after Meissen porcelain, and for 25 years the two remained the only European producers. Initially it was a private enterprise, founded by Claude du Paquier, an official of the Viennese Imperial court, but in 1744 it was rescued from financial difficulties when bought by the Empress Maria Theresa, and thereafter remained an asset of the emperors.

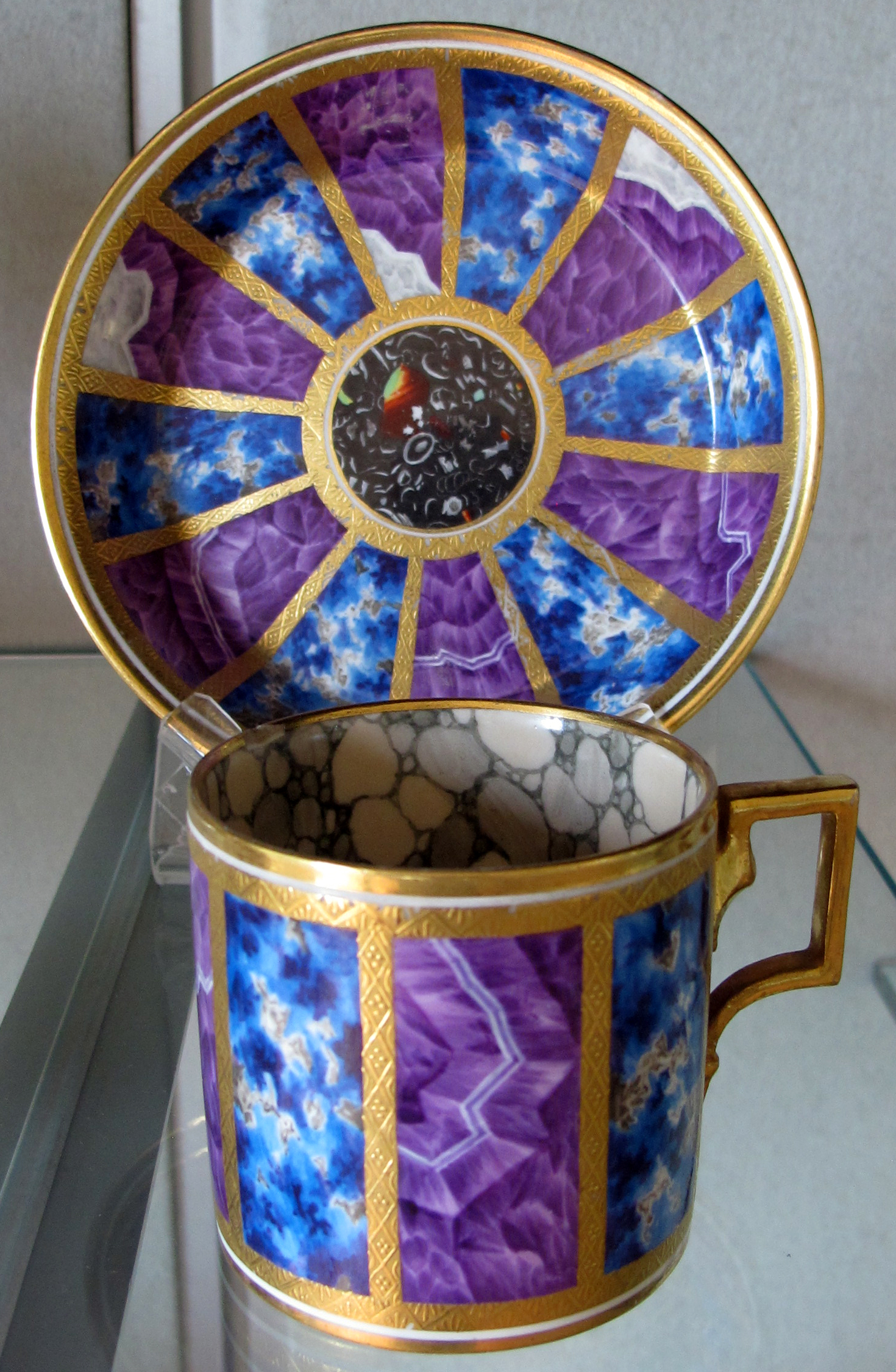
1790s Sorgenthal period cup and saucer, probably mainly intended to be displayed in a cabinet rather than used.

The wares from the earlier, private period before 1744 are the most sought-after today, if only because production was lower and so the pieces are much more rare. These are often called Du Paquier porcelain from the Du Paquier factory. The other high point, "perhaps the factory's most glamorous period", was from 1784 to 1805 when a variety of innovative wares in broadly Neoclassical styles were produced, then with Sèvres porcelain the main influence. Wares were used as diplomatic gifts by the emperors, and exports to the Ottoman Empire were significant.

== History ==
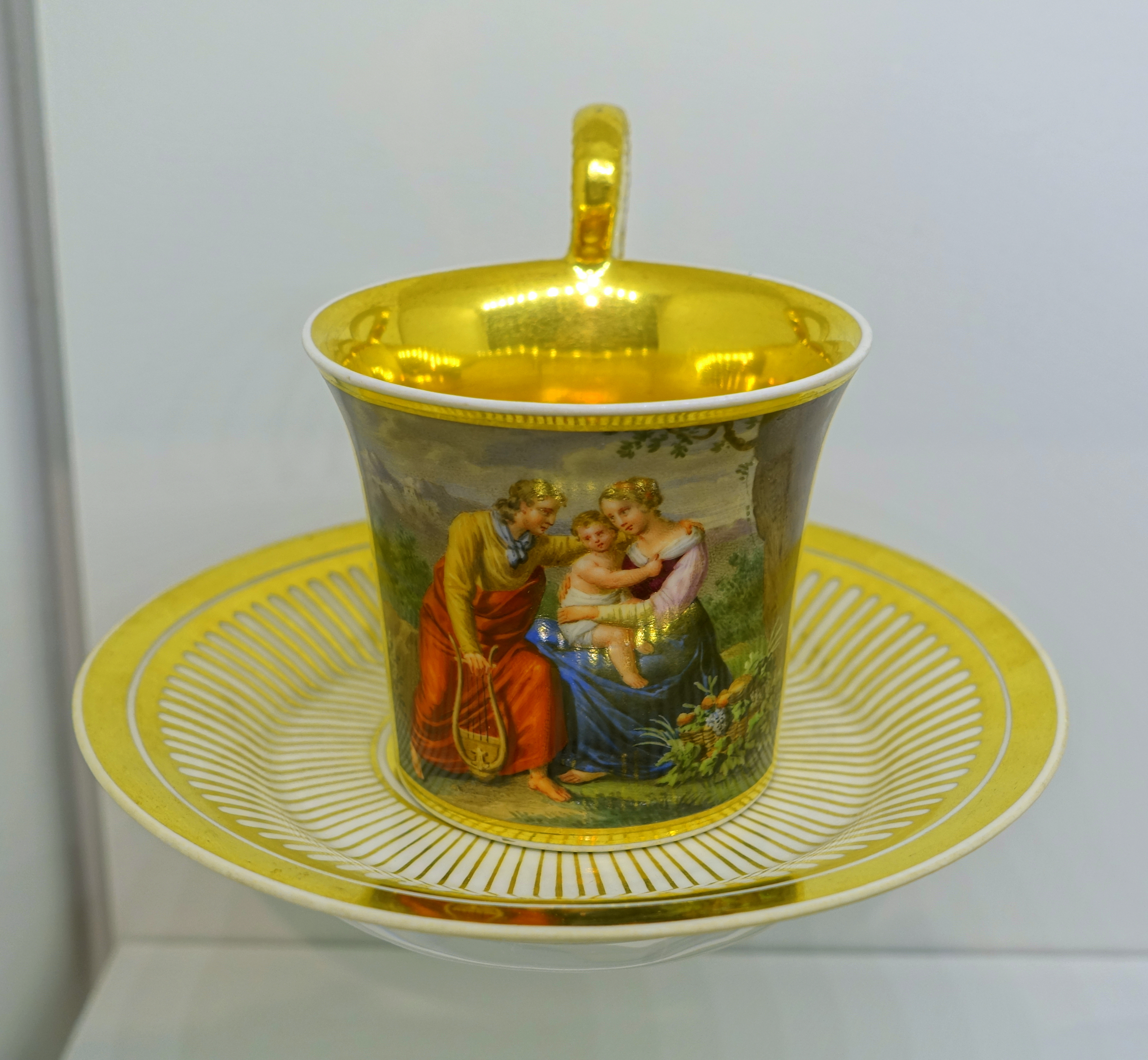
Sorgenthal period, early 1800s, Neoclassical cup and saucer

In 1717, Claudius Innocentius Du Paquier went looking to produce porcelain in Vienna. When he was unsuccessful he bribed Christoph Conrad Hunger from Meissen for the secret formula. When Hunger's knowledge was not enough he hired Samuel Stölzel in 1719 leading to the factory's first successful hard-paste porcelain production. The factory was on Porzellangasse ("Porcelain Lane") in Alsergrund, now Vienna's 9th district. The history of the manufactory is often divided by German writers into five periods. The first period, used by all sources, was under its founder and first director du Paquier, who was given a monopoly for 25 years. This is therefore known as the "Du Paquier period", and many sources talk of "Du Paquier porcelain" and the "Du Paquier factory", usually with a capital "D", although his actual name has a small "d". While Meissen and most later German factories were owned by the local ruler, and usually heavily funded, du Pacquier received only permission to manufacture, and many orders for wares, from the emperor, and the factory seems always to have been under-capitalized in his time. This situation lasted from 1718 to 1744, when the monopoly expired and the financial difficulties apparently came to a head; the Empress intervened by buying the factory, which was then renamed as the "Imperial State Manufactory Vienna".

The second period is the "Plastic period" (1744–1784), the third is the "Sorgenthal period", or "Painterly period" (Malerische Periode) of 1784–1805, then the "Biedermeier period" (1805–1833) and finally the "Late Biedermeier period" (1833–1864).

By the last quarter of the 18th century, as many as 120,000 pieces annually were exported to the Ottoman Empire; these were typically brightly coloured, but less finely painted than those for European markets. Many were sets of the small cups used for Turkish coffee.

The factory received a boost from the Congress of Vienna in 1815, in the course of which it was visited by a number of monarchs and other leading figures, although Prince Regent George of the United Kingdom never went to Vienna and so missed the service he would have been presented with. According to another account, the Prince preferred to be sent a quantity of Tokay wine. Although exports to the Ottoman Empire continued, by the 1860s the factory was suffering from increased competition from Bohemian factories in particular, and was eventually closed by the Austrian parliament in 1864, with the moulds and other equipment being given to the Museum of Applied Arts, Vienna. The wares are sometimes called "old Vienna" (or Alt Wien in German).

The name was revived in 1923 with the foundation of the Vienna Porcelain Manufactory Augarten.

The reopening was fortunate as it went along with the Art Deco movement. It captivated the Viennese with symbolisms of modern living, optimistic atmosphere, and social changes.

== Characteristics ==
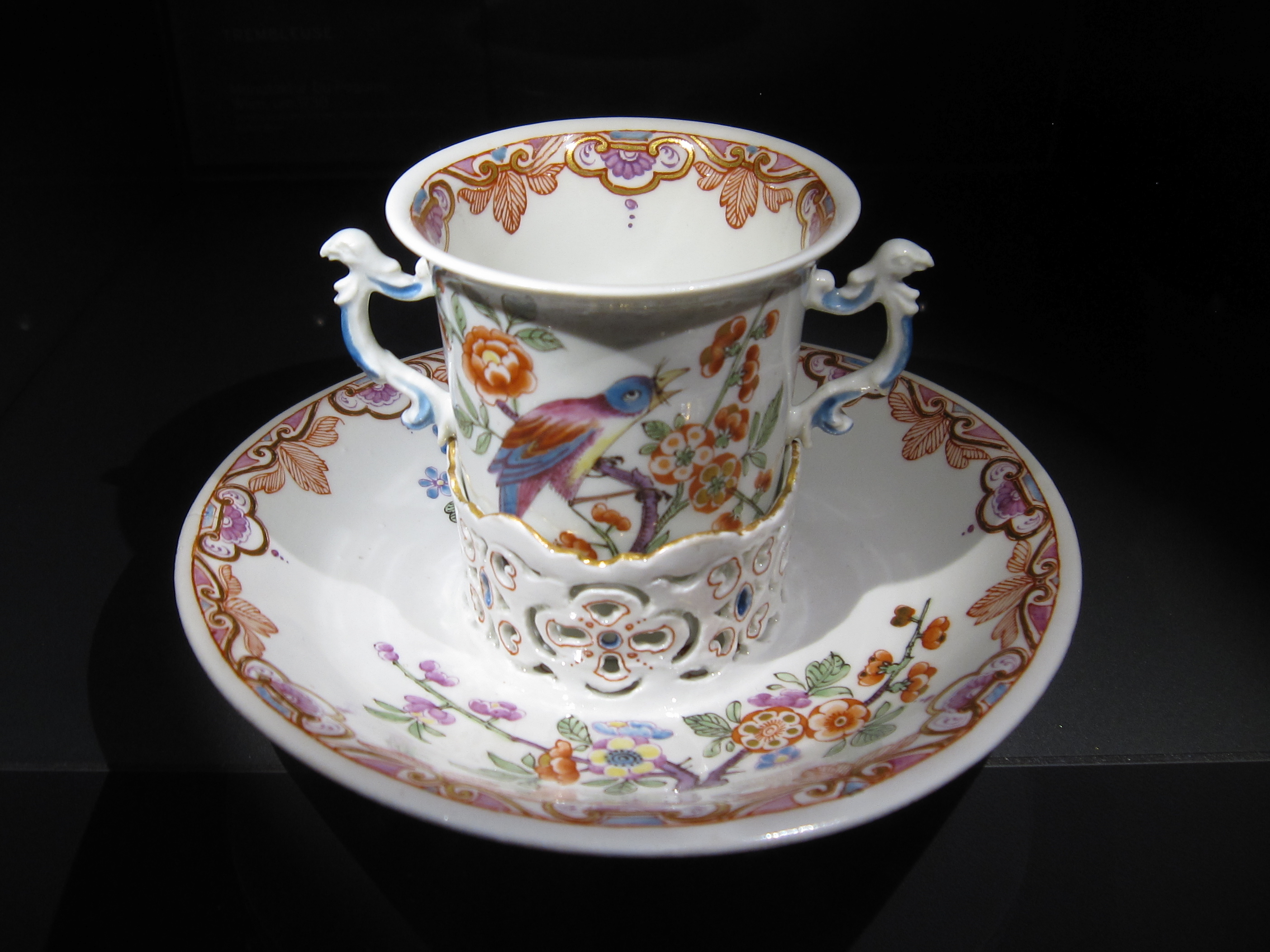
Vienna porcelain trembleuse cup from the du Paquier period, 1730

At Augarten, there is a meticulous attention to the details of production. The process involves precisely combining materials and using time-tested techniques. Like most factories in the German-speaking world, it was founded with expertise provided by key workers enticed from Meissen porcelain, who brought the secrets of the Meissen materials and techniques with them, and the wares remained broadly similar to those made there, although the body was not exactly the same, and gradually improved. Wares were hard-paste porcelain, and always of very high quality. The paste underwent different processes based on the intended purpose. A thick liquid slip was used for moldable pieces. Whereas a ripened past was used for flat items like plates. All the pieces were hand-glazed with a liquid mixture. The mixture contained quartz, feldspar, kaolin, and dolomite. The glaze was quickly absorbed leaving a fine coating. Handles, knobs, edges, and rims were carefully touched up with a brush as well as excess being wiped off from the rims.

Initially mostly table wares were produced, often with a slightly blueish tinge to the plain body. European flowers (as opposed to East Asian ones copied from imports) were used in decoration from around 1730, before Meissen, and subsequently very widely used across European factories. As at Meissen, chinoiserie decoration was also often used, as were hunting and battle scenes.

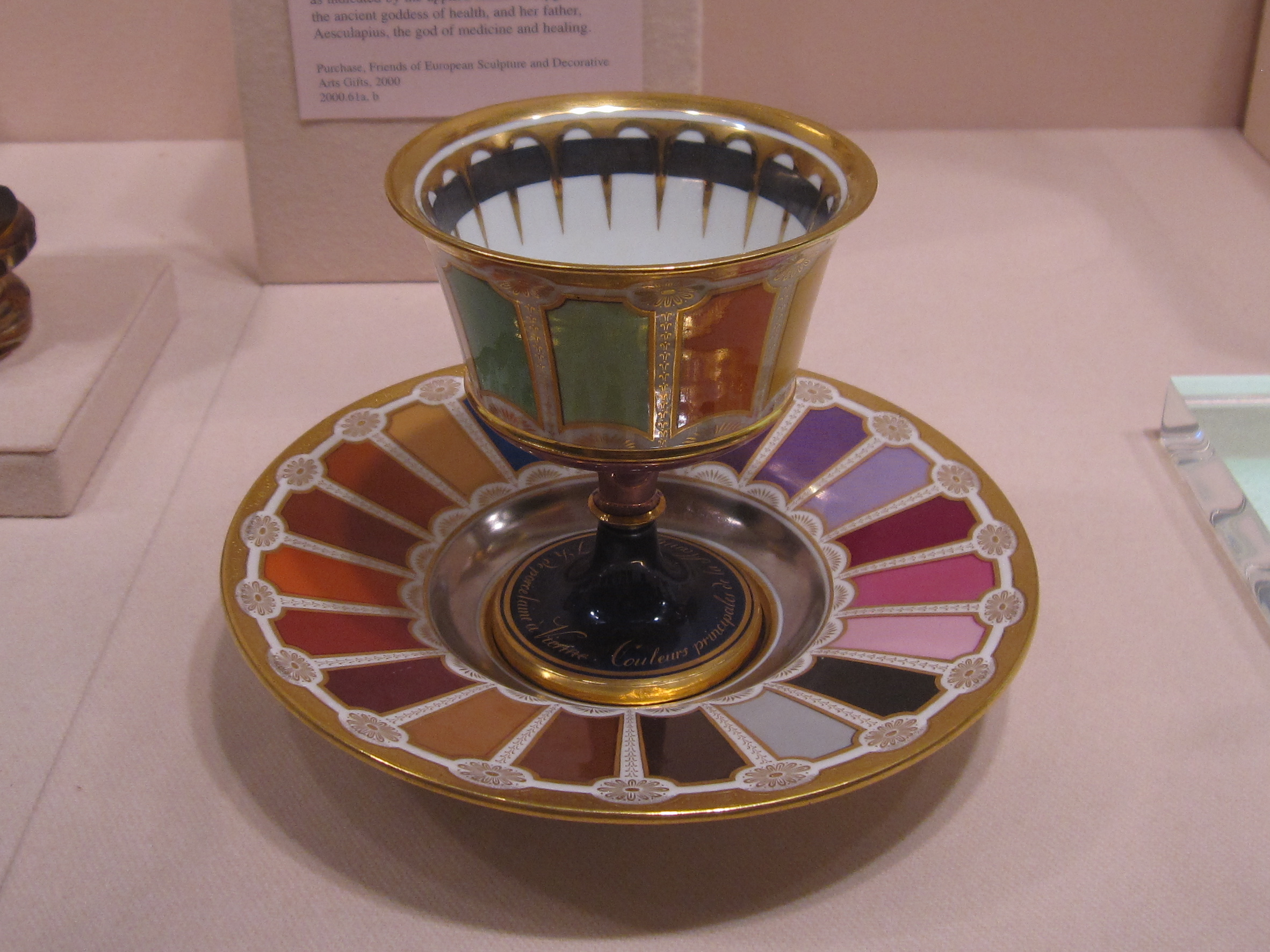
Goblet and saucer, Sorgenthal period 1804, showing the range of colours in use.

The Du Paquier period began the tradition of strong and varied colours, which was to remain a strength of Vienna porcelain. There was heavy use of openwork in some pieces. In 1725 the factory inaugurated a style, called Laub- und Bandelwerk in German. The style has intricate painted borders or backgrounds of trellis, bandwork, palmettes, garlands, fruit and other very formalized plant motifs. Sometimes painted in black the designs were usually colored in red, violet, green, blue, and yellow. White handles and rims were usually brightend with Gold and Silver but some knobs and handles were also formed as animals, and sometimes people.

Like other factories in major capitals, including Meissen, Capodimonte and Buen Retiro in Madrid, Vienna produced a few porcelain rooms for palaces, the only surviving example of which is now installed in the Museum of Applied Arts, Vienna. However, the porcelain here does not cover all the wall space that is not window or mirror, as in other examples, but is a border around the wall-spaces, with matching plaques on the furniture.

Porcelain was used for diplomatic gifts; the Hermitage Museum retains most of a service made in 1735 for Empress Anna of Russia, which included more than 40 tureens. Other pieces are dispersed (the early Soviet government sold several pieces), and a tureen from the service made $365,000 at Christie's in New York in 2014.

Chief modellers included Johann Joseph Niedermeyer, working from 1747 to 1784, and Anton Grassi from 1778 to 1807, who was sent to study classical remains in Rome for several months in 1792. Neither quite achieved the charm of the light-hearted genre figures of other factories. Like Meissen and other German factories, some Vienna pieces were decorated by outside painters, or Hausmalers.

A new director, Konrad von Sorgenthal, took over during a financial crisis in 1784 and changed the style of wares, following the fashion for Neoclassicism and taking some influence from Sèvres. Bright colours, extensive use of gold, and very detailed painting characterize the style, and set the typical Vienna style for decades to come. Another Neoclassical fashion in porcelain which Vienna embraced was the biscuit porcelain figure. Many pieces of tableware, especially cups with saucers, were now essentially made for display in porcelain cabinets, rather than use.

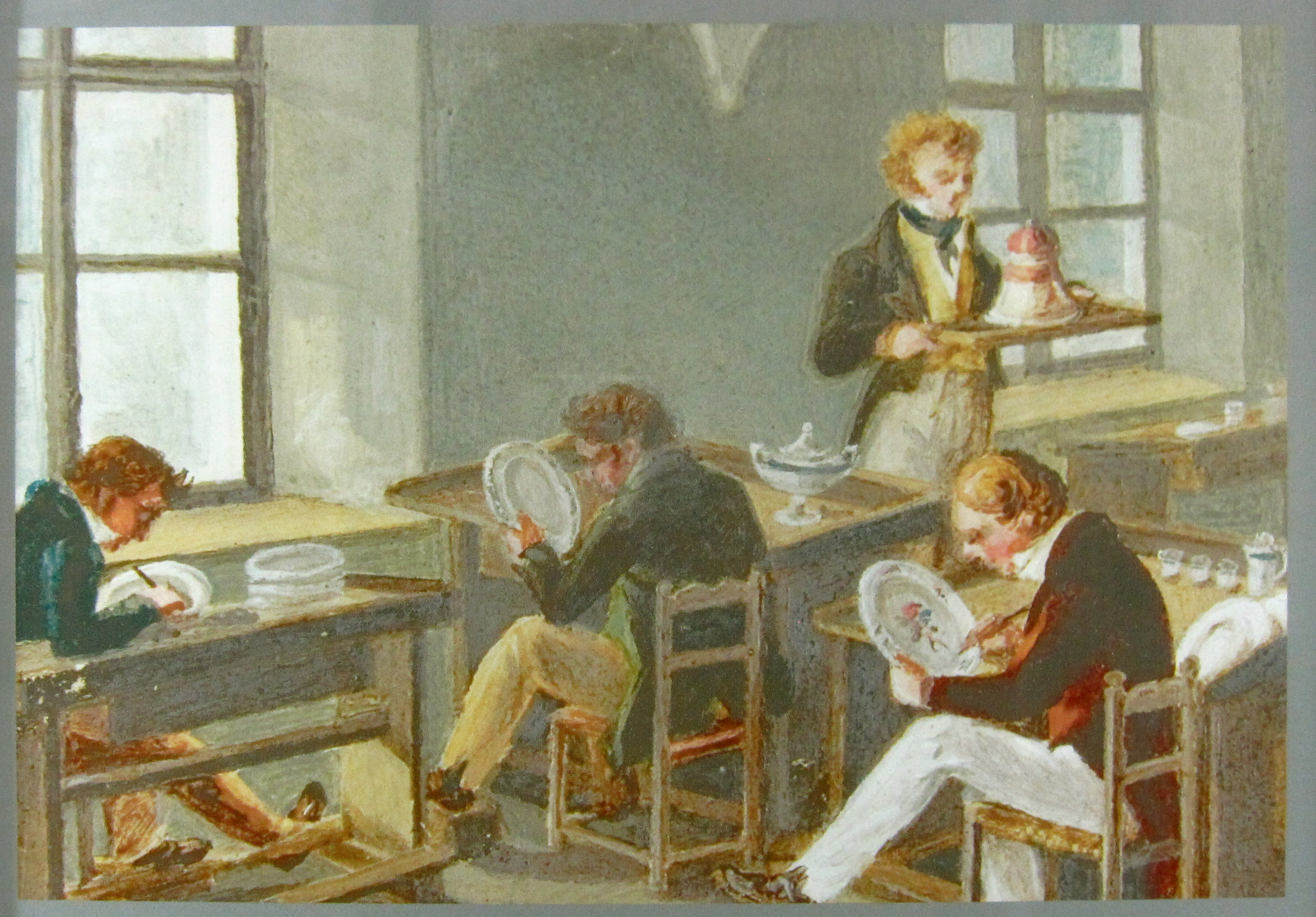
Painters at work, c. 1830

Sorgenthal employed painters known in other media: Anton Kothgasser (1769–1851) was also a painter of glass, and Moritz Michael Daffinger (1790–1849), the son of a painter for the factory, worked for them until 1809, before concentrating on painting portrait miniatures.

After Sorgenthal, Matthias Niedermayer assumed the role of director at the factory. During this time, the factory maintained its production of wares in the Neo-classical style. However, in the 1830s, there was a shift towards heavier and rounded shapes. Painters at the factory continued to decorate with recreations of Old Masters and original botanical, topographical, and Classical compositions. Nevertheless, the overall decoration became less elaborate, and there was a decline in the quality of execution.

The quality of wares was in decline by the late 1820s, when unsuccessful attempts began to revive the factory by producing cheaper wares from lower-quality materials, decorators paid on piecework, and some use of printed transfer. All were counter-productive, and production continued to reduce, although some high-quality pieces were produced until the end.

Some moulds and undecorated fired "blanks" were bought by other factories, including Herend, and added to the considerable volume of imitations, "replicas" and downright forgeries that have copied Vienna porcelain. Other genuine Vienna pieces had their decoration scraped off to be repainted in a more elaborate style.

== Marks ==
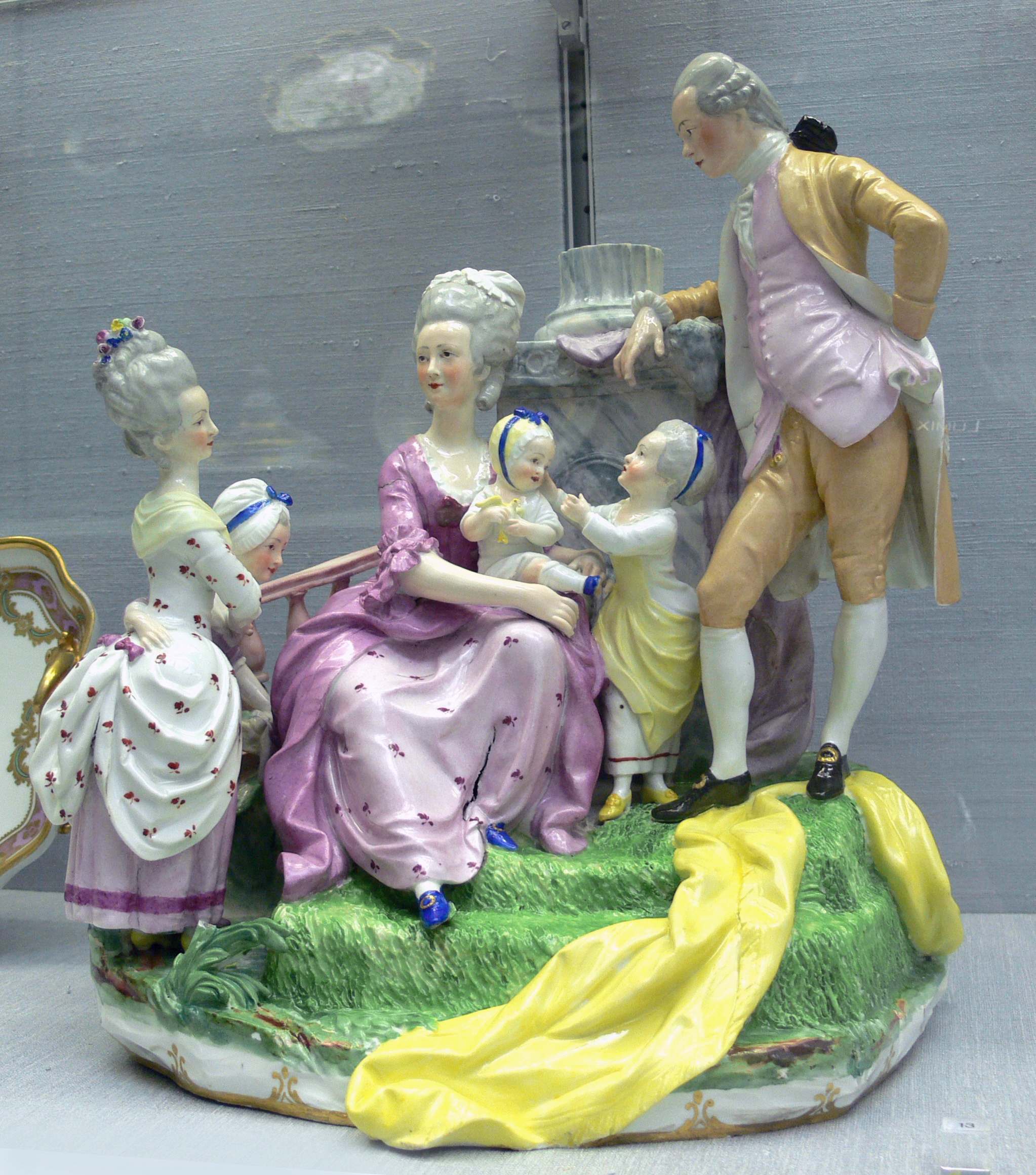
Group of the future Emperor Leopold II and his family, 1775–1780

No marks were used before the Imperial takeover in 1744, after which a "beehive-shaped shield" was used, either in blue or impressed. In 1783 the impressed date mark was introduced, beginning with "83", the last two digits were impressed. Then running from "801" for 1801 the last three digits of the year were impressed. Painters, and the turners responsible for the body, can often be identified by the numbers they were given, which were added to the underside of pieces to ensure they were paid for the right pieces.

== Exhibitions ==
Imperial Privilege: Vienna Porcelain of Du Paquier, 1718–44 was held at the Metropolitan Museum of Art in 2009–2010. To celebrate the 300th anniversary of the founding of the factory, the Museum of Applied Arts, Vienna had the exhibition 300 Years of the Vienna Porcelain Manufactory, to September 2018, covering all periods of production in Vienna. The Uffizi in Florence, ran another from November 2018 to March 2019, covering only the Du Paquier period and drawing from the collections of the Florence Porcelain Museum and the Liechtenstein collection. The Frick Collection in New York also celebrated the anniversary with a dedicated installation in 2017–2018.

One of the most complete collections of Vienna porcelain is the over 1,000 pieces in the Marton Museum in Croatia, showing the development from the Du Paquier period until 1864, especially in the Maria Theresa period from 1744 to 1780, which is often less appreciated by museums and collectors, and the Sorgenthal period between 1784 and 1805. Selections from the collection have been exhibited in museums including Sèvres and the Liechtenstein Museum, and catalogues have been published.

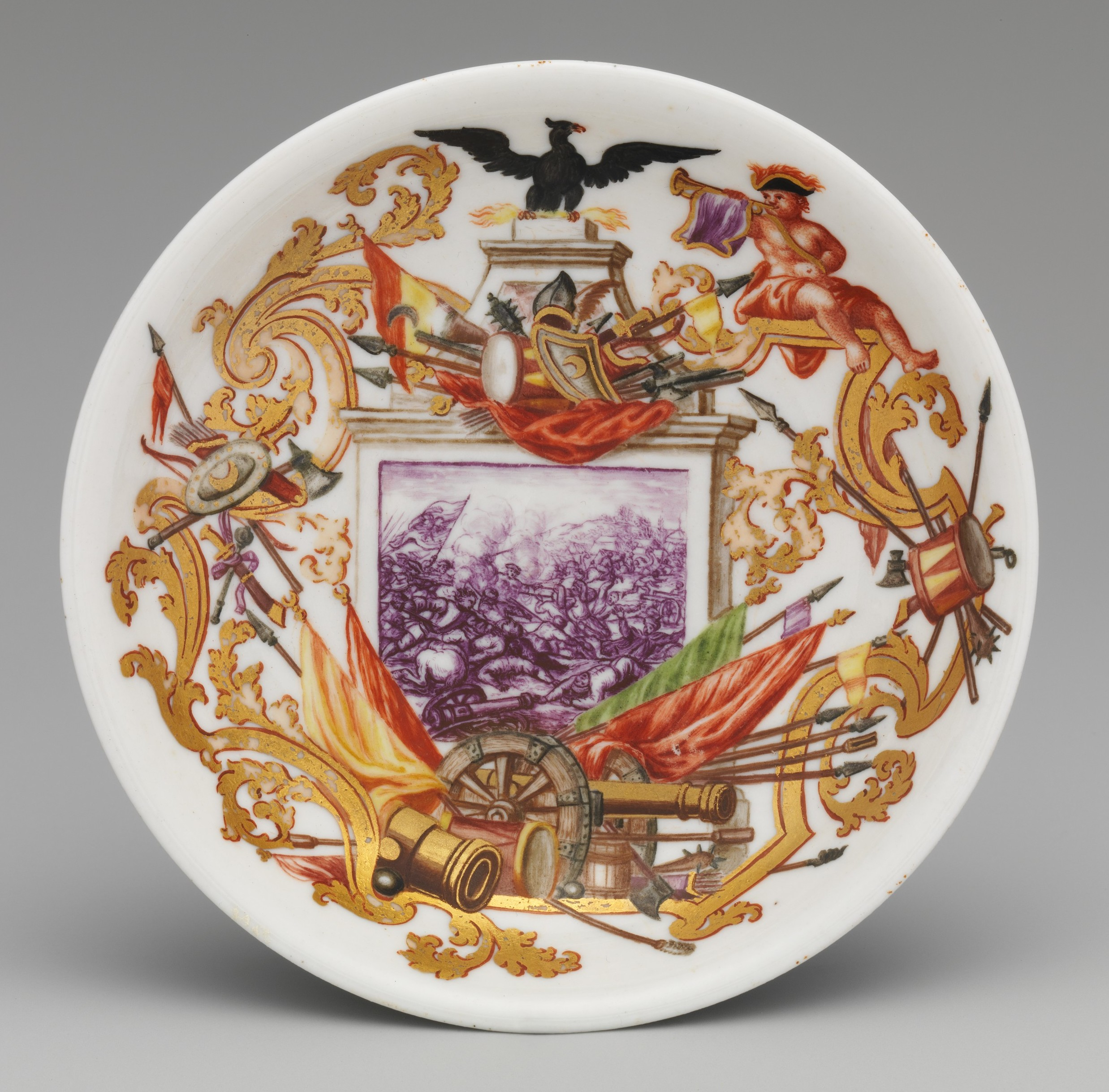
Saucer, 1726, Du Paquier period

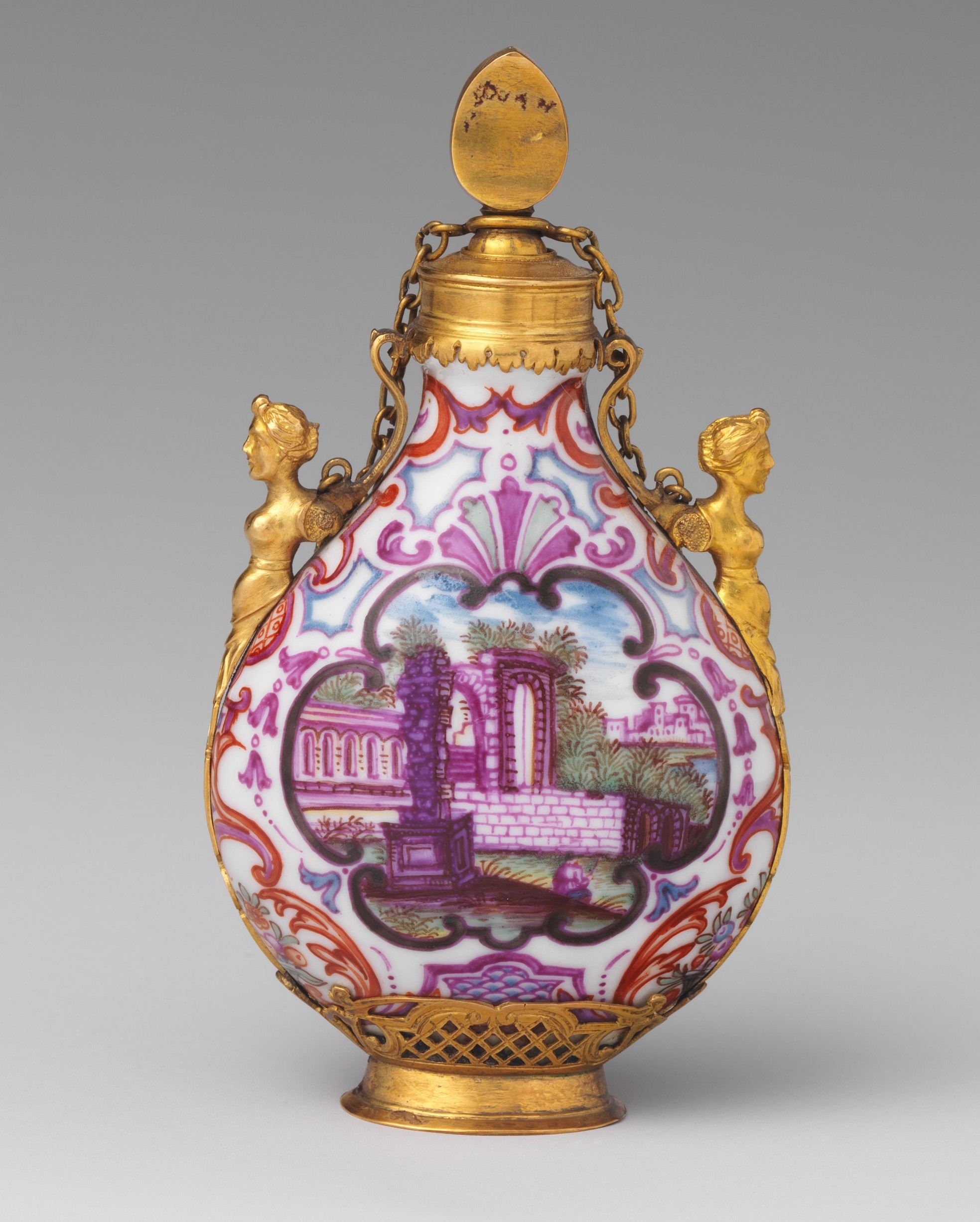
Scent bottle with gold mounts, c. 1730, Du Paquier period

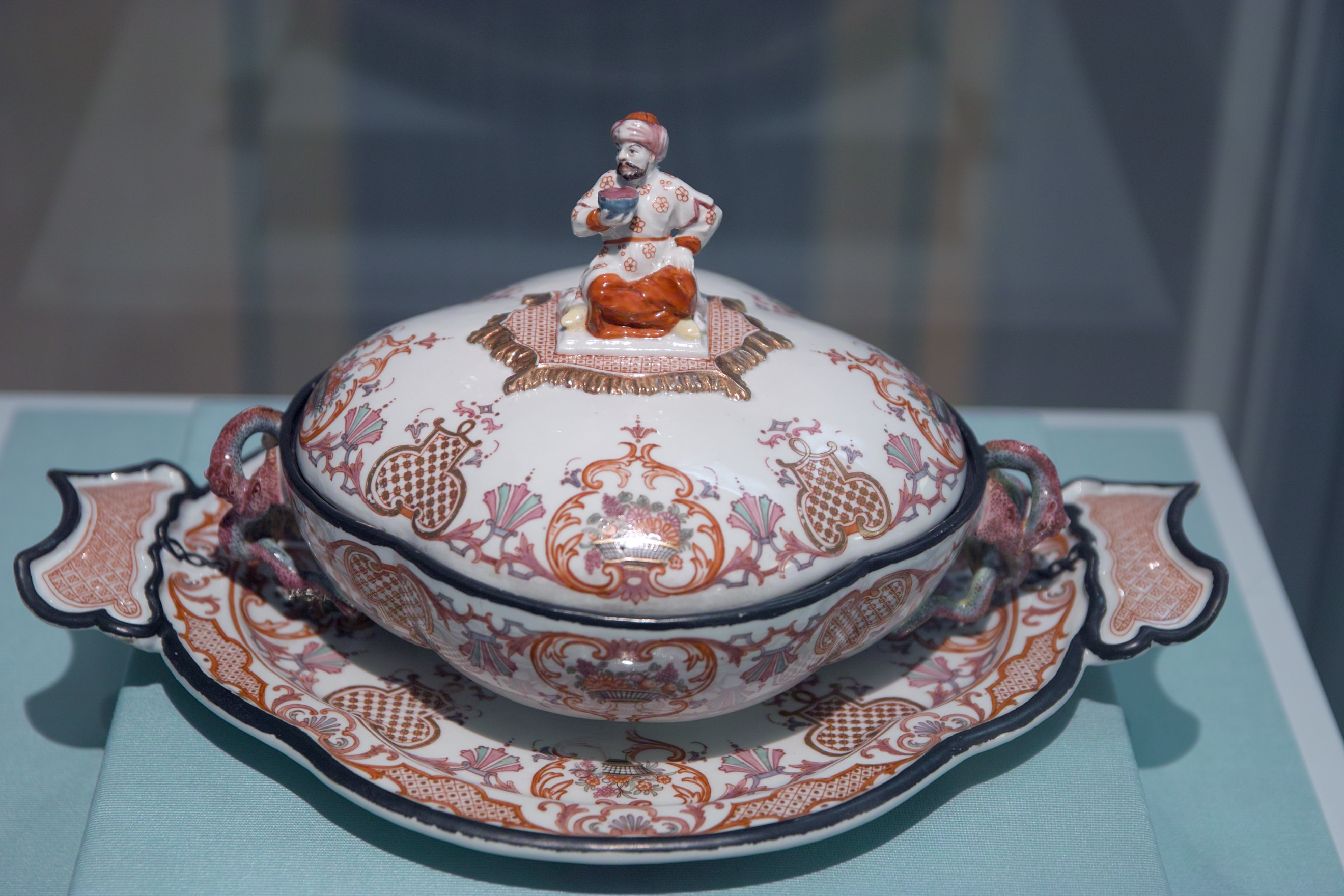
Tureen, 1730s, with Laub- und Bandelwerk typical of the Du Paquier period.

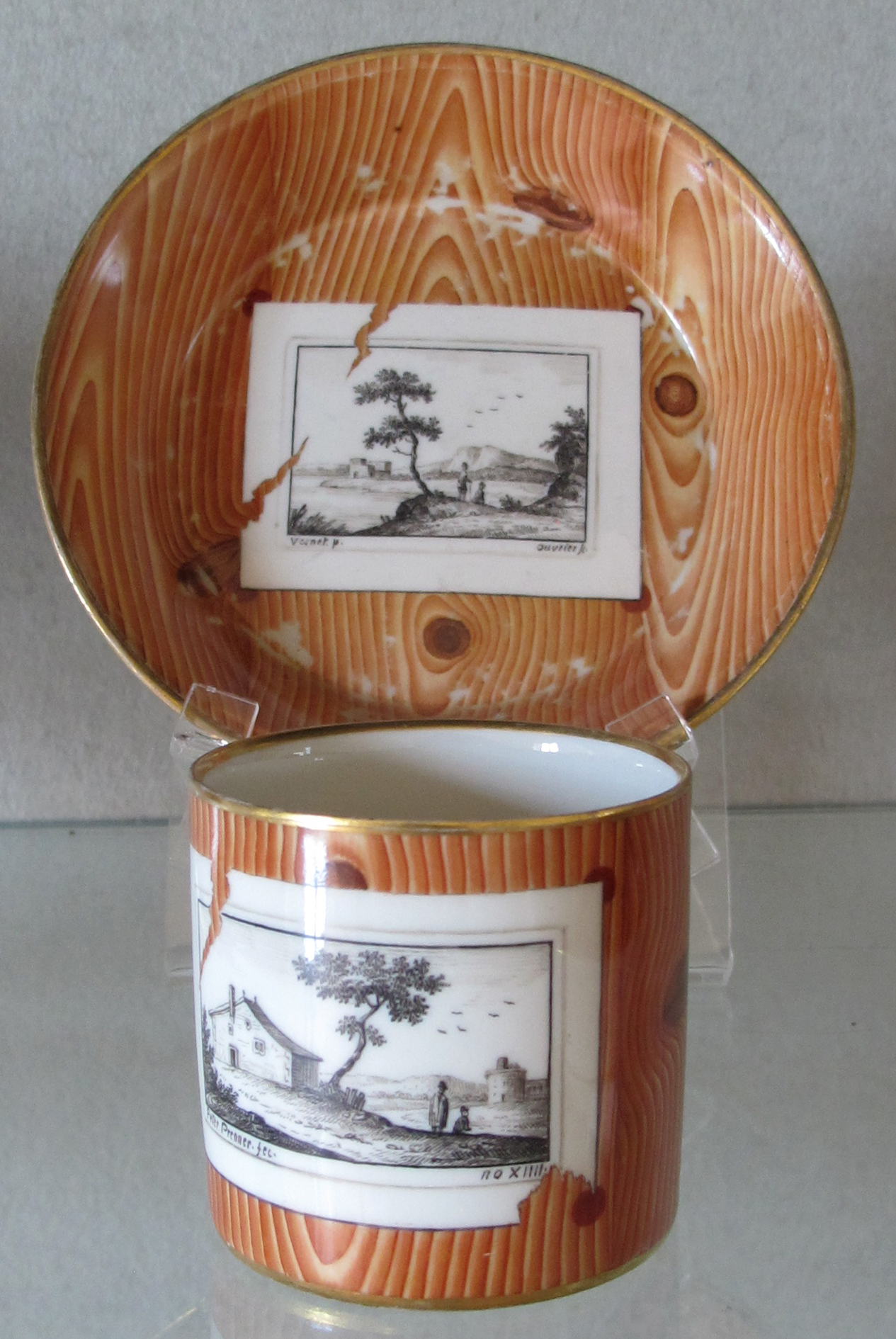
From a service imitating prints and wood

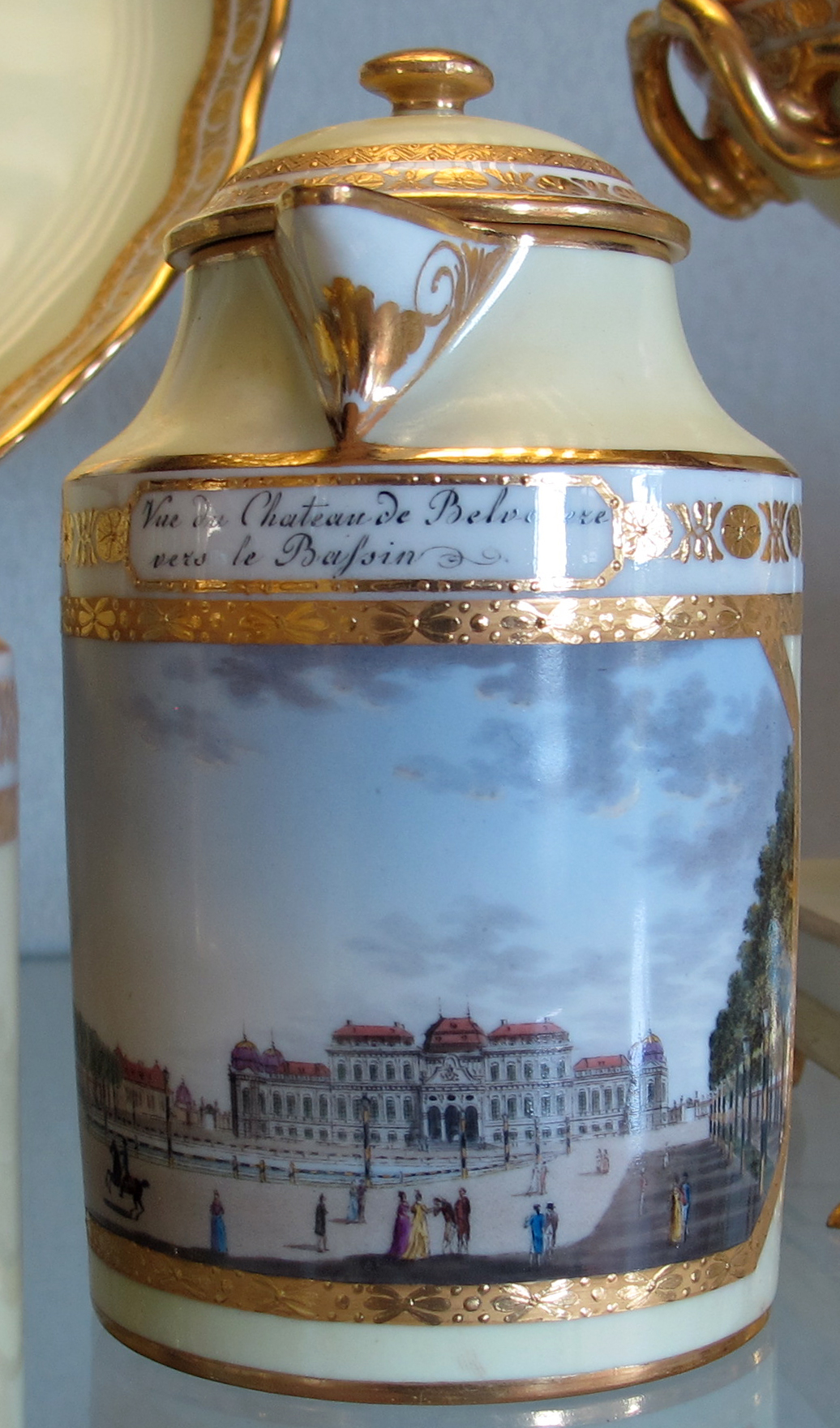
Milk jug, c. 1800, with view of Vienna, Sorgenthal period

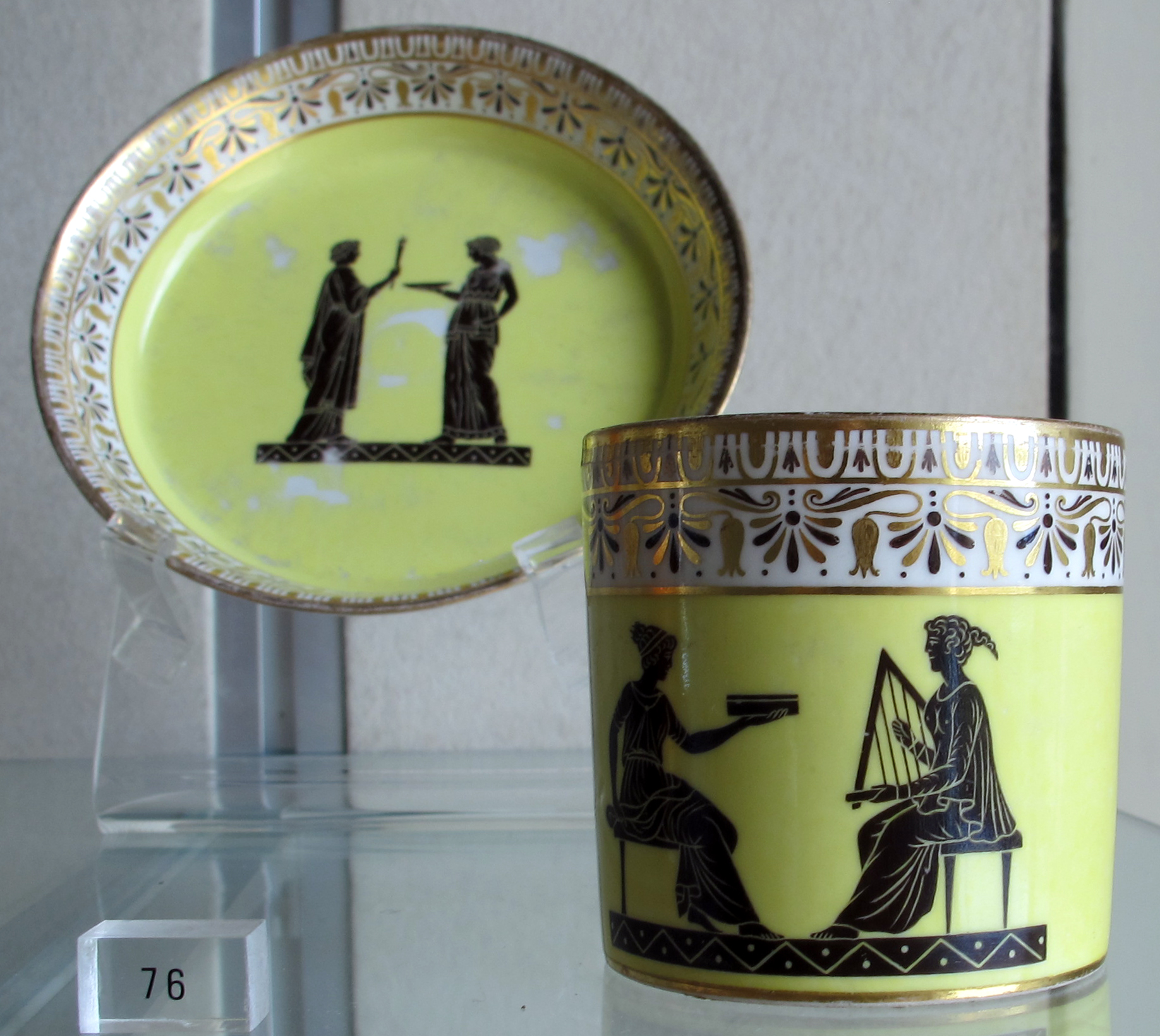
Greek Revival, Sorgenthal period, 1801

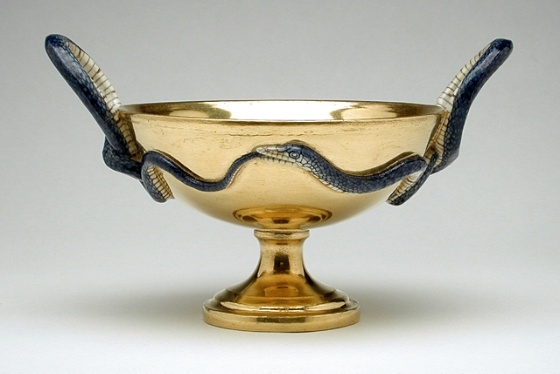
From a coffee-service, 1806

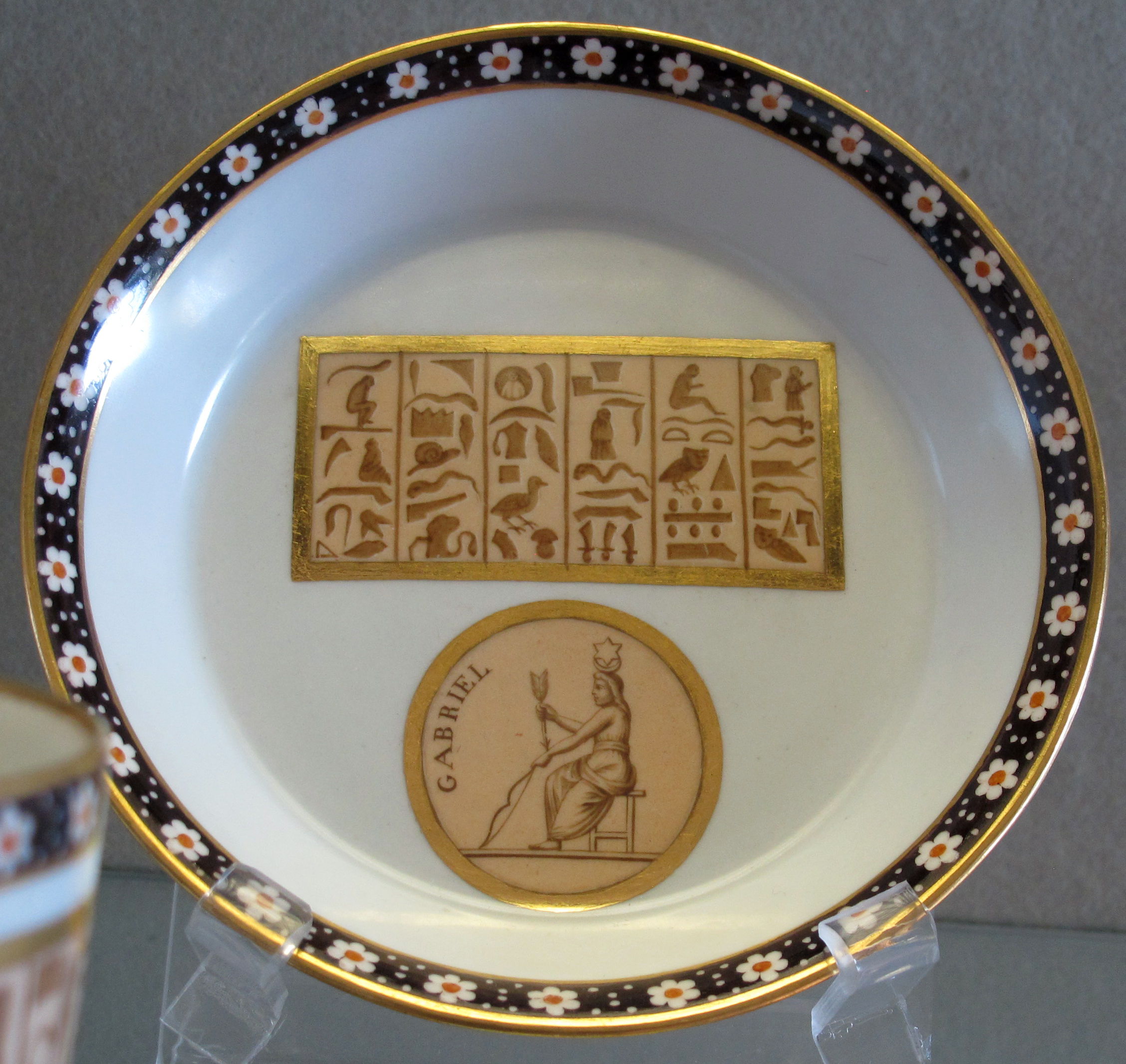
Plate from a "Neo-Egyptian" service, Sorgenthal period c. 1802–1811

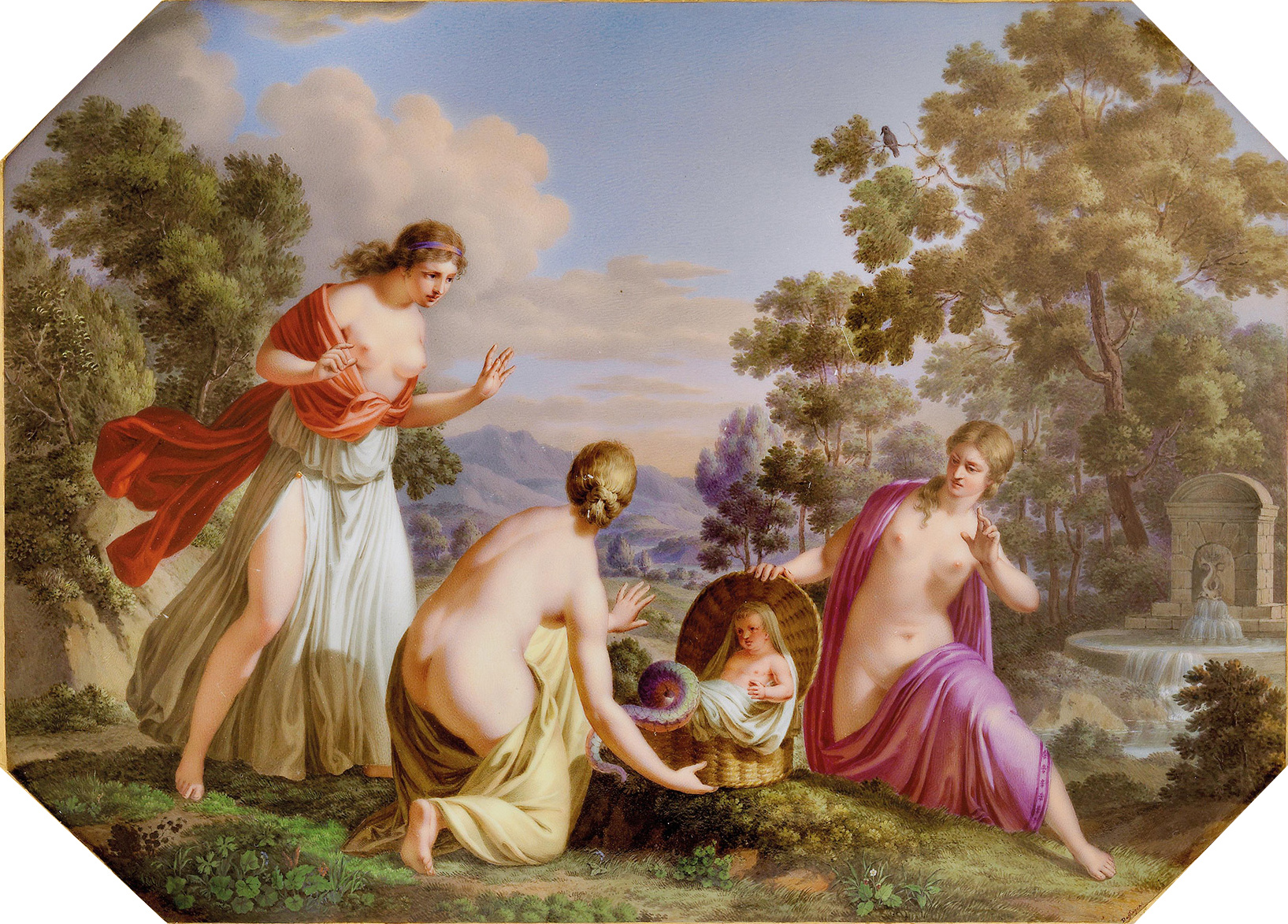
Detail from a tray painted by Daffinger, after 1808, Cecrops' Daughters Discover Erichtonius
