= Hraničky =

Village in the Czech Republic

- Village
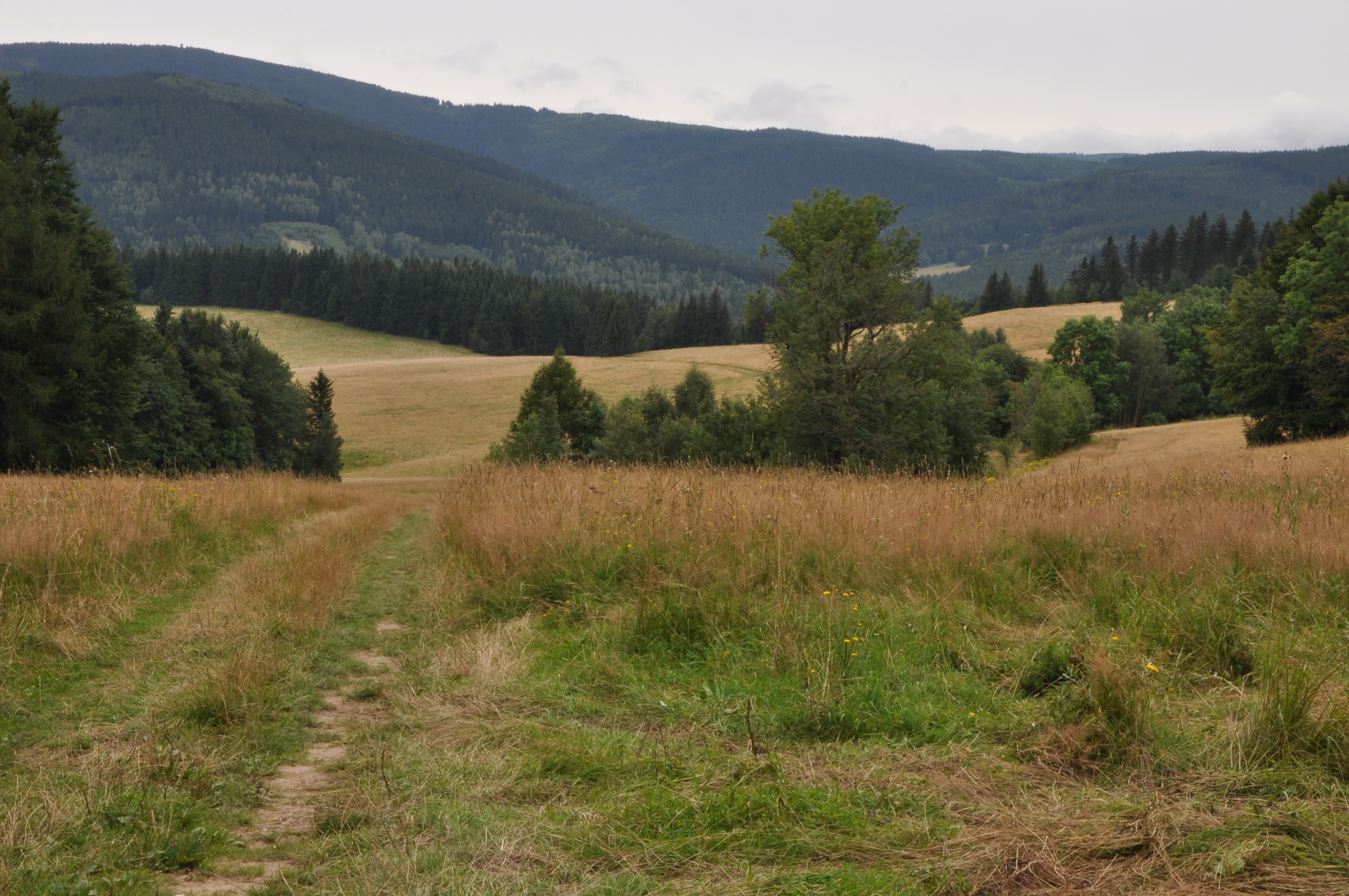
- Meadows at Hraničky

- Location in the Czech Republic
- Coordinates: 50°18′50″N 16°58′22″E
- Country: Czech Republic
- Region: Olomouc
- District: Jeseník
- Municipality: Uhelná
- Established: 1785

Area
  - Total: 5.07 km^{2} (1.96 sq mi)
- Elevation: 696 m (2,283 ft)

Population (2021)
  - Total: 6
  - Density: 1.2/km^{2} (3.1/sq mi)
- Time zone: UTC+1 (CET)
  - Summer (DST): UTC+2 (CEST)
- Postal code: 790 68

Hraničky (German: Gränzdorf) is a settlement and municipal part of Uhelná in Jeseník District in the Olomouc Region of the Czech Republic. It has 6 inhabitants. The village almost disappeared after World War II and today only one house remains.

== Geography ==
Hraničky is located in the southern part of the territory of Uhelná, about 19 kilometres (12 mi) northwest of Jeseník and 82 km (51 mi) north of Olomouc, next to the Czech–Polish state border. It lies in the Golden Mountains.

== History ==
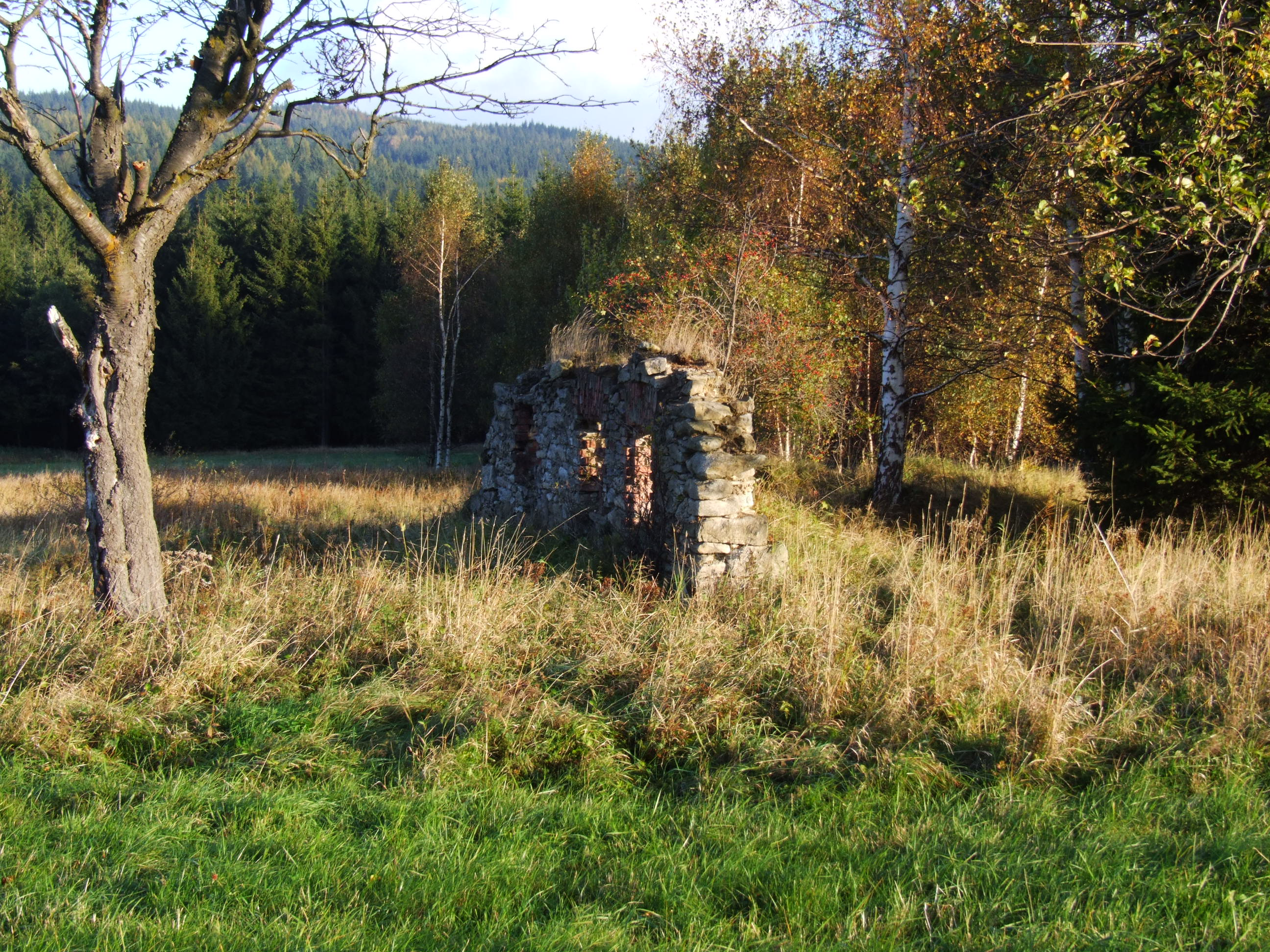
Ruins of a house

Hraničky was founded 1785 and administratively was part of Nové Vilémovice. The settlers were exclusively ethnic German, which were mainly lumberjacks from the area of Staré Město and Králíky. In addition to working in the forest, herding, and modest agriculture, the local people also made their living by collecting grass seeds from mountain meadows. Due to its location on the state border with the Kingdom of Prussia, smuggling was also common. At the beginning of the 19th century, the Chapel of Saint Joseph was built. A school was built in 1885.

After World War II, the German-speaking inhabitants were expelled. All but four families were expelled from Hraničky, but in 1949, the village remained completely empty. The Czechs were not interested in moving into the mountain village. In the early 1950s, the former resident Franz Schlegel and his family (all of whom successfully avoided the expulsion of Germans) moved back to his house, which thus saved from demolition. The rest of the village, however, remained unoccupied and therefore in 1959 the Czechoslovak communist government decided to completely destroy the settlement.

== Demographics ==
Historical population

Year	Pop.	±%
1869	260	—
1880	236	−9.2%
1890	222	−5.9%
1900	211	−5.0%
1910	193	−8.5%

Year	Pop.	±%
1921	192	−0.5%
1930	178	−7.3%
1950	0	−100.0%
1961	14	—
1970	6	−57.1%

Year	Pop.	±%
1980	4	−33.3%
1991	6	+50.0%
2001	1	−83.3%
2011	2	+100.0%
2021	6	+200.0%

Source: Censuses

== Sights ==
There are no protected cultural monuments in the village area.
