= Johann Nepomuk Rust =

Austrian surgeon and military physician

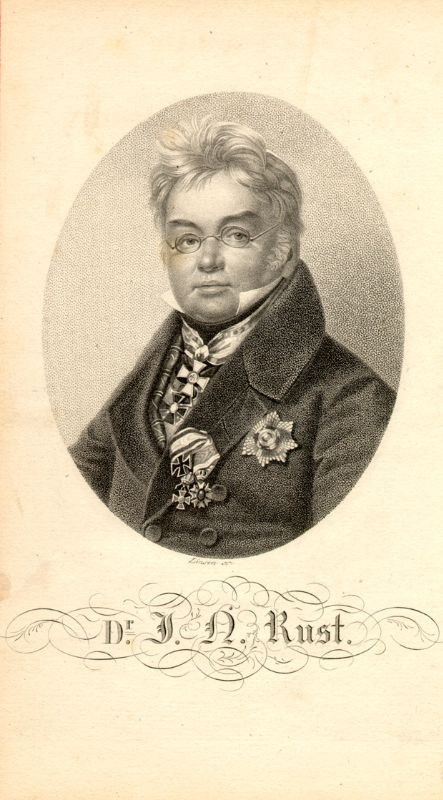
Johann Nepomuk Rust

Johann Nepomuk Rust (5 April 1775 – 9 October 1840) was an Austrian surgeon and military physician born at Jánský Vrch, Javorník, Austrian Silesia (today in the Czech Republic).

== Biography ==
He studied medicine in Prague, earning his degree in obstetrics in 1799 and a doctorate in surgery in 1800. Afterwards he worked briefly in Vienna and Paris, and later taught classes at the Lyceum in Olomouc. From 1803 to 1810 he was a professor of surgery at the University of Kraków, where he established a local surgical clinic. In 1810 he was named chief surgeon at the Allgemeines Krankenhaus in Vienna.

In 1815 he became a member of the Prussian military as a physician. The following year he became director of the new surgical/ophthalmological clinic at the Charité, as well as adjunct professor at the medical-surgical military academy in Berlin. In 1822 he was awarded with the military title of Generalstabsarzt (Surgeon General), and in 1824 became a full professor at the University of Berlin. In 1834, he was elected a foreign member of the Royal Swedish Academy of Sciences. In 1837 he was appointed director of surgical and pharmaceutical studies at the university.

Among his literary works was a highly acclaimed multi-volume textbook on surgery titled "Theoretisch-praktisches Handbuch der Chirurgie, mit Einschluss der syphilitischen und Augen-Krankheiten" (1830–1836). In 1816 he became editor of the "Magazins für die gesammte Heilkunde". Towards the end of his career, he suffered from failing eyesight, and consequently most of his later surgical operations were performed by Johann Friedrich Dieffenbach (1792–1847). He died in 1840 on his estate Schloss Kleutsch [today: Kluczowa] near Ząbkowice Śląskie in Silesia, Prussia.

== Associated eponym ==
- Rust's disease: Tuberculosis of the two upper cervical vertebrae and their articulations; synonymous to tuberculous spondylitis.
