= Travná (Javorník) =

- Village
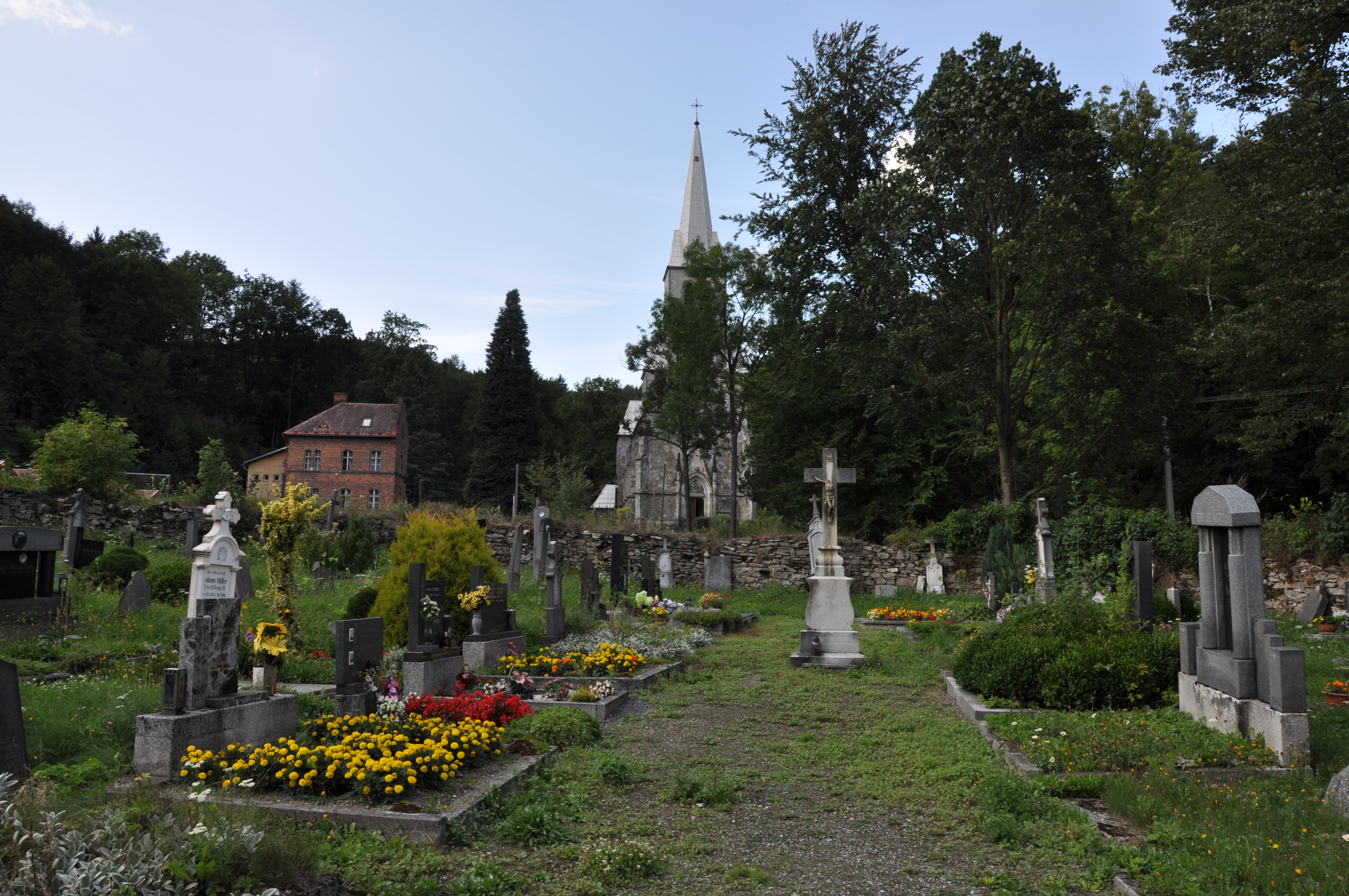
- Church of the Immaculate Conception

- Location in the Czech Republic
- Coordinates: 50°22′26″N 16°56′5″E
- Country: Czech Republic
- Region: Olomouc
- District: Jeseník
- Municipality: Uhelná
- First mentioned: 1296

Area
  - Total: 6.51 km^{2} (2.51 sq mi)
- Elevation: 484 m (1,588 ft)

Population (2021)
  - Total: 56
  - Density: 8.6/km^{2} (22/sq mi)
- Time zone: UTC+1 (CET)
  - Summer (DST): UTC+2 (CEST)
- Postal code: 790 70

Travná (until 1948 Krutvald; German: Krautenwalde) is a village and municipal part of Javorník in Jeseník District in the Olomouc Region of the Czech Republic. It has about 50 inhabitants.

== Etymology ==
The initial German name Krautenwalde means 'herbal forest'. The former Czech name Krutvald was created by transcription. In 1948, the municipality was renamed Travná (from tráva, i.e. 'grass'), which is loosely based on the first part of the former name.

== Geography ==
Travná is located in the western part of the territory of Javorník, about 25 kilometres (16 mi) northwest of Jeseník and 89 km (55 mi) north of Olomouc, on the border with Poland. It lies in the Golden Mountains.

== History ==
The first written mention of Travná is from 1295. At the beginning of the 14th century, it was acquired by the members of the Haugwitz family, who sold it to the bishops of Breslau in 1358. In the 16th century, a hammer mill stood here and iron ore was mined in the surrounding area. Travná was badly damaged during the Thirty Years' War and during the Seven Years' War. In 1770, Travná was annexed to the Vlčice estate, owned by the Schaffgotsch family. They owned the estate until 1919. Travná gained importance in the mid-19th century, when a chapel was built here and the pilgrimage tradition was established.

== Demographics ==
Historical population

Year	Pop.	±%
1869	479	—
1880	475	−0.8%
1890	440	−7.4%
1900	427	−3.0%
1910	353	−17.3%

Year	Pop.	±%
1921	403	+14.2%
1930	438	+8.7%
1950	106	−75.8%
1961	188	+77.4%
1970	114	−39.4%

Year	Pop.	±%
1980	77	−32.5%
1991	43	−44.2%
2001	53	+23.3%
2011	57	+7.5%
2021	56	−1.8%

Source: Censuses

== Sights ==
Travná is known for a pilgrimage site, which consists of the Church of the Immaculate Conception with the rectory, Chapel of the Virgin Mary of La Salette, a grotto, and the Stations of the Cross. The chapel was built in 1851 and expanded in 1858. The neo-Gothic church was built in 1879–1892 according to the design by Friedrich von Schmidt.
