= Philipp Gotthard von Schaffgotsch =

German Prince-Bishop of Breslau (1716-1795)

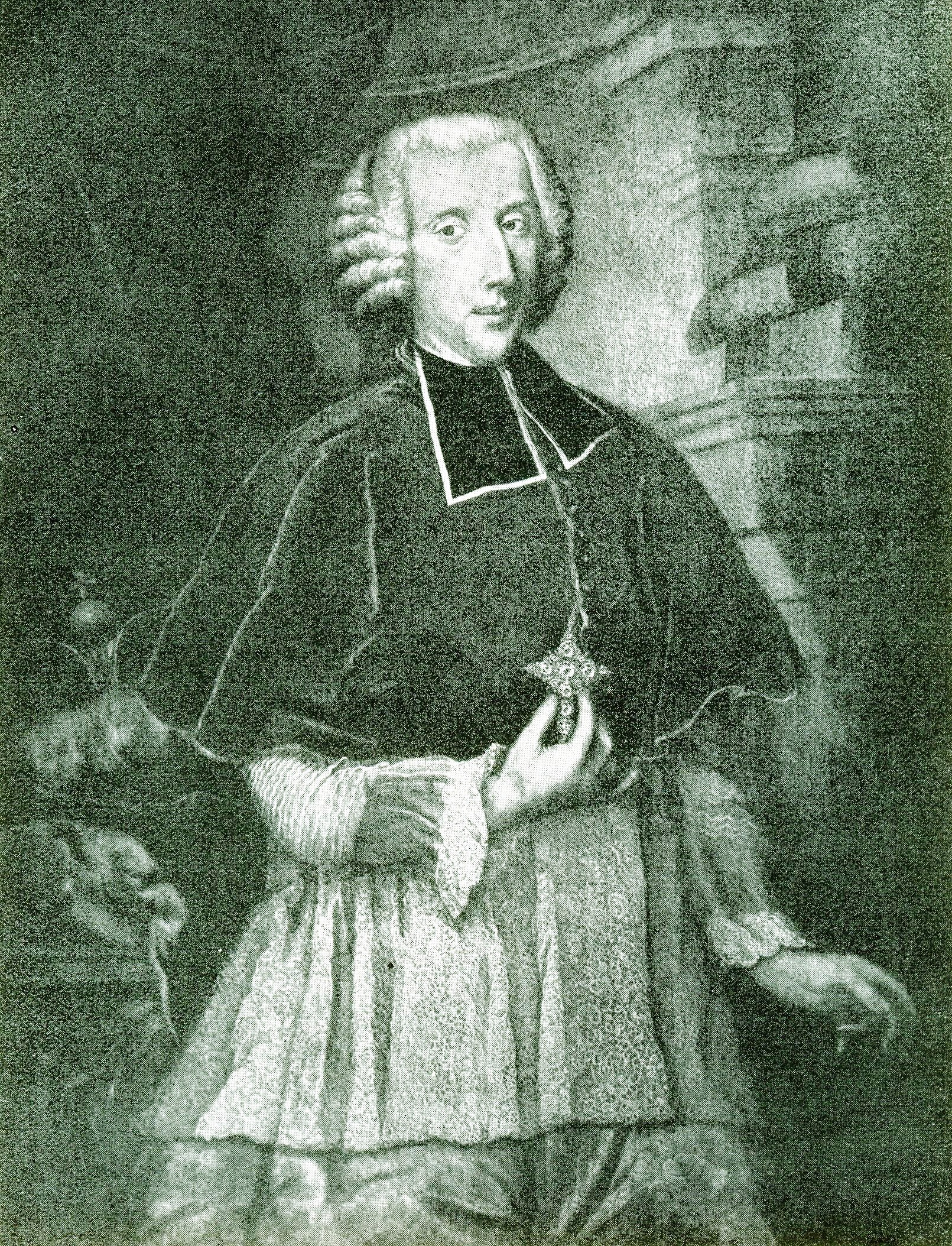
Count Philipp Gotthard von Schaffgotsch

Count Philipp Gotthard von Schaffgotsch (3 July 1716 – 5 January 1795) was a German Prince-Bishop of Breslau and an important promoter of music.

== Ecclesiastical career ==
Schaffgotsch was born in Bad Warmbrunn in the Giant Mountains into the House of Schaffgotsch, an old Silesian aristocratic family. He was educated by the Jesuits at the Collegium Romanum in Rome. In 1738, Schaffgotsch was ordained a Roman Catholic priest in Vienna and was appointed a canon in Olomouc, Halberstadt and later in Breslau. During this time he became a member of the fraternal organization known as Freemasons and was heavily influenced by the Enlightenment-era ideas and philosophies. And although Freemasonry was condemned by Pope Clement XII in 1738 in the papal bull In eminenti, Schaffgotsch supported the creation of the first Freemason loge in the Austrian capital, Vienna. Despite his disagreements with the Vatican, in 1743 he was created an abbot and soon after a coadjutor bishop of Breslau to Prince-Bishop Philipp Ludwig von Sinzendorf. Following Sinzendorf's death in 1747, Schaffgotsch was elevated by King Frederick II of Prussia to Prince-Bishop. Frederick had previously appointed Schaffgotsch as coadjutor against the resistance of the Breslau cathedral chapter. This appointment was confirmed by Pope Benedict XIV on 5 March 1748 despite Schaffgotsch's relationship with Freemasons. Count Philipp Gotthard of Schaffgotsch was finally consecrated on 1 May 1748.

== Later years ==
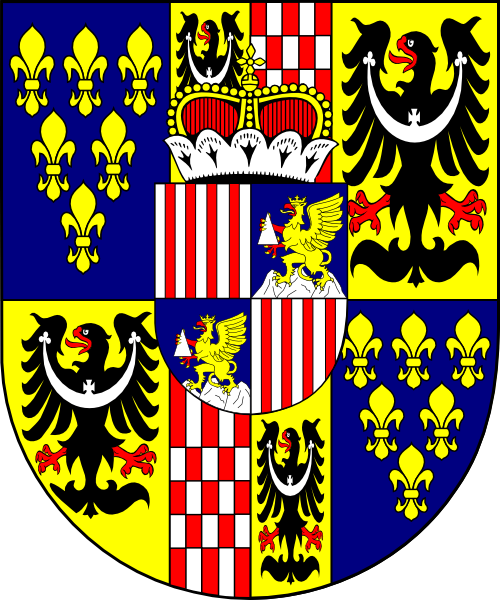
Bishop Gotthard CoA.

In 1757, at the outset of the Seven Years' War, Schaffgotsch, on the advice of Empress Maria Theresa, left Breslau and moved the seat of his diocese to castle Jánský Vrch in Austrian Silesia. Frederick the Great viewed this move by the Prince-Bishop as betrayal and placed the Breslau diocese under official administration where it remained for the remainder of the war. In 1763, Schaffgotsch was allowed to return to the Prussian part of the diocese, but was confined to Oppeln and unable to return to Breslau. His calls for reinstatement were also ignored by the King who appointed auxiliary bishop Johann Moritz von Strachwitz and in 1781 auxiliary bishop Anton Ferdinand von Rothkirch und Panthen to oversee the Prussian part of the diocese. In 1766 Schaffgotsch fled from Oppeln back on the castle Jánský Vrch in Austrian Silesia, which remained his residence until his death in 1795 and from where he led the Austrian part of the diocese.

Schaffsgotsch's palace in Breslau was located on the land plot which currently houses the Wroclaw Ethnographic Museum. It was nationalized after his fallout with king Frederick, and subsequently rebuilt.

During his time in Javorník, Jánský Vrch became a cultural center of the region, and a meeting place for artist from the entire Holy Roman Empire. Among the most notable was composer Carl Ditters von Dittersdorf who resided in Javorník for over 20 years. Schaffgotsch died at the castle in 1795 and was buried in the family tomb in Warmbrunn.

== Sources ==
- Schmilewski, Ulrich : Neue Deutsche Biographie, Bd. 22, pages 536-538
- Pachl, Hans - Jauernig und das Jauerniger Ländchen. Ein Heimatbuch des ehemaligen Gerichtsbezirks Jauernig - 1983
- Gernot, Ludwig und Wolf, Kurt - Jauernig und das Jauerniger Ländchen. Das 2. Heimatbuch des ehemaligen Gerichtsbezirkes Jauernig - 1995
