= Zálesí (Javorník) =

Coordinates: 50°21′32″N 16°55′55″E

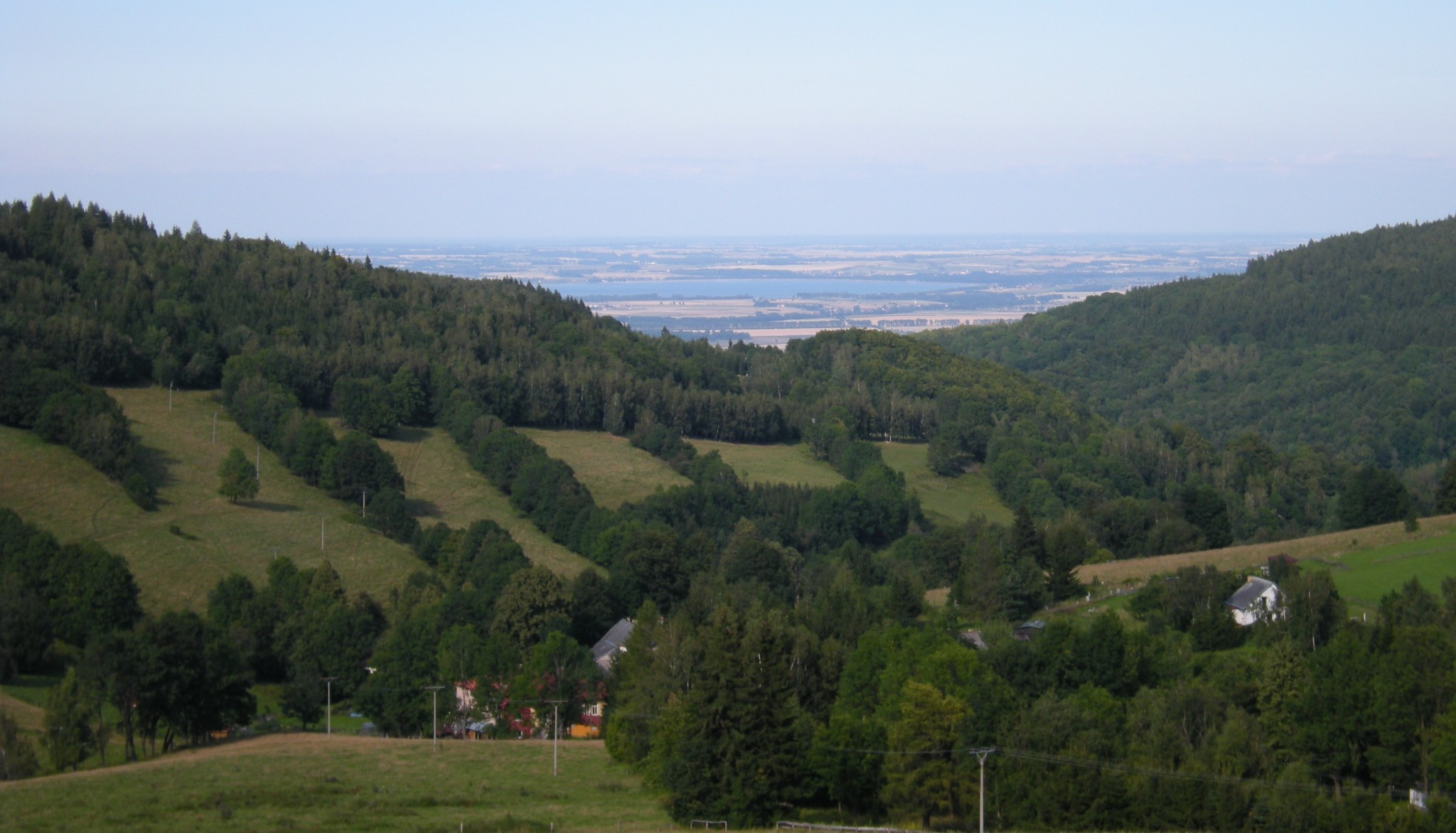
Landscape surrounding Zálesí

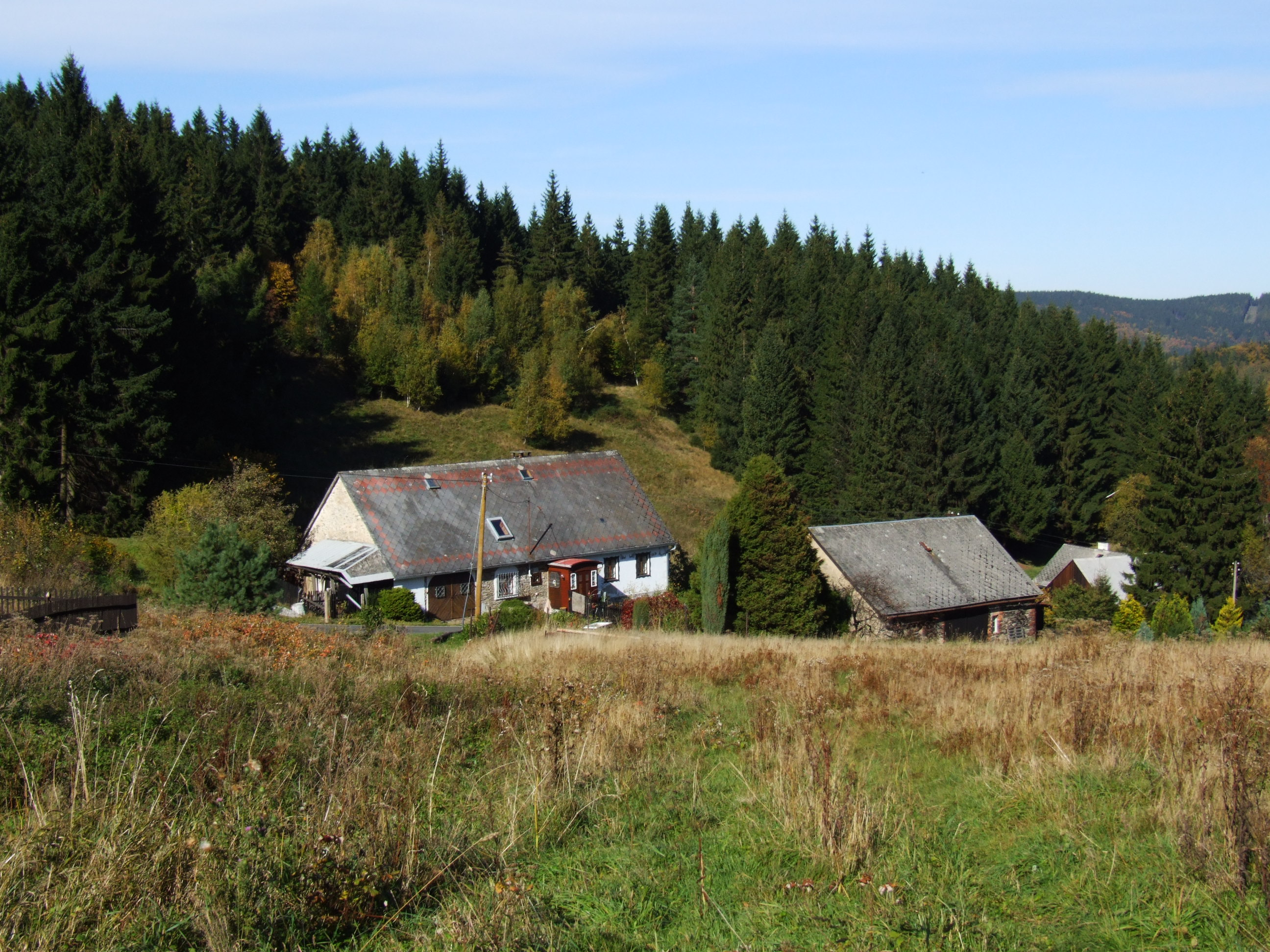
Houses in the village

Zálesí (until 1948 Valdek); (German: Waldek) is a village and administrative part of Javorník in the Olomouc Region of the Czech Republic. The population was 20 according to 2001 census. It is located in the Golden Mountains.

== History ==
In the past, the village administered the no-longer existing settlement Waldoro.

Travná had 456 inhabitants in 1930 and the same number declared residency in 1939.
