= Nové Vilémovice =

- Village
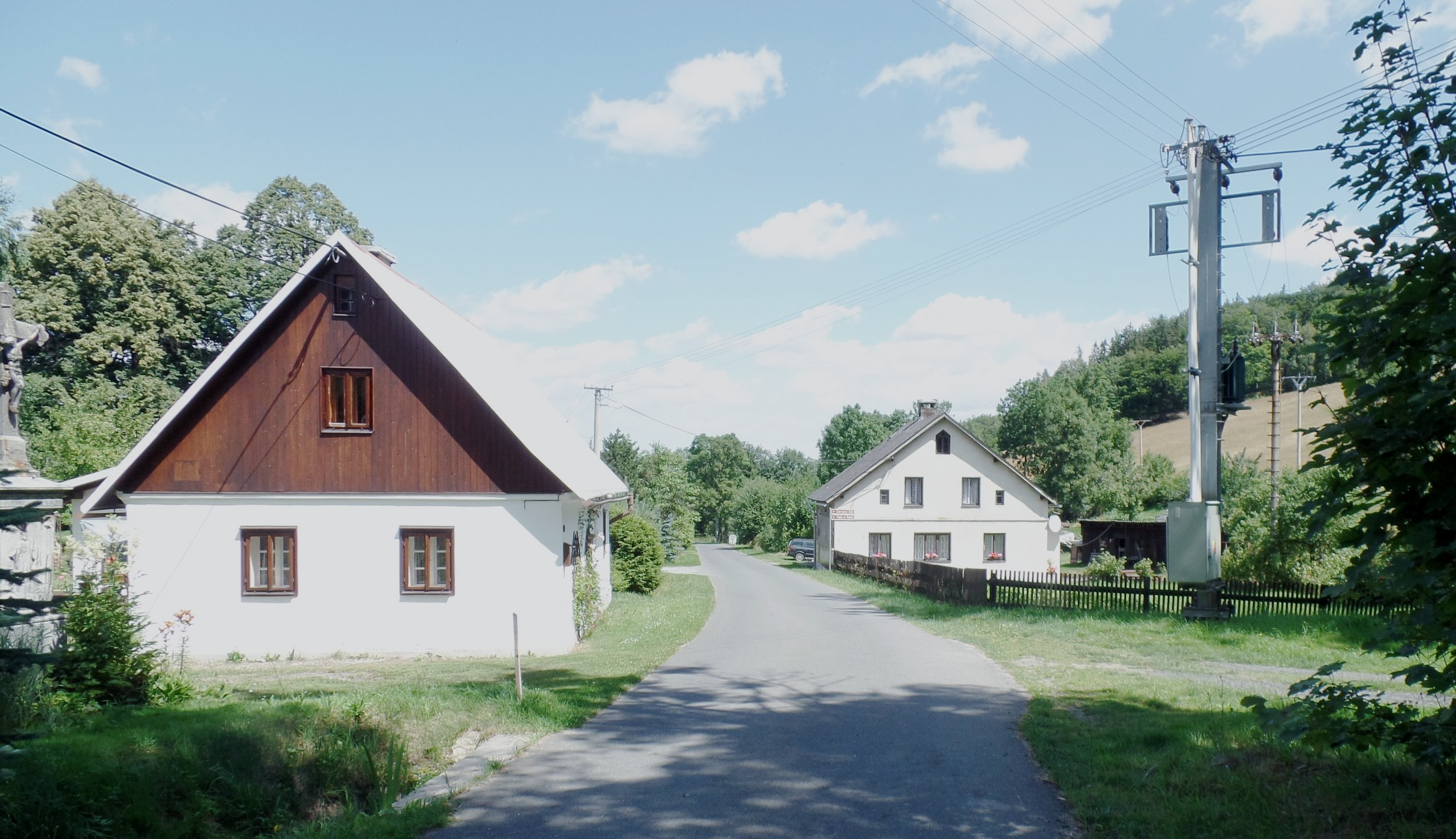
- Main road

- Location in the Czech Republic
- Coordinates: 50°20′6″N 16°59′17″E
- Country: Czech Republic
- Region: Olomouc
- District: Jeseník
- Municipality: Uhelná
- First mentioned: 1290

Area
  - Total: 6.66 km^{2} (2.57 sq mi)
- Elevation: 597 m (1,959 ft)

Population (2021)
  - Total: 24
  - Density: 3.6/km^{2} (9.3/sq mi)
- Time zone: UTC+1 (CET)
  - Summer (DST): UTC+2 (CEST)
- Postal code: 790 68

Nové Vilémovice (German: Neu-Wilmsdorf) is a village and municipal part of Uhelná in Jeseník District in the Olomouc Region of the Czech Republic. It has about 20 inhabitants.

== Etymology ==
The name Vilémovice (Wilmsdorf in German) means "Vilém's (Wilhelm') village". It was probably the name of the founder of the village. The village was abandoned and after it was restored in 1580, it was given the prefix nové ('new').

== Geography ==
Nové Vilémovice is located in the central part of the territory of Uhelná, about 19 kilometres (12 mi) northwest of Jeseník and 84 km (52 mi) north of Olomouc. It lies in the Golden Mountains.

== History ==
Vilémovice was founded in the 13th century. Initially, it was owned by the members of the Haugwitz family, who sold it to the bishops of Breslau. Before 1420, the village was abandoned, and was restored only in 1580. Nové Vilémovice was damaged by the Thirty Years' War. In 1765, the Chapel of the Assumption of the Virgin Mary was built. In 1832, the chapel became a church.

Until 1918, Nové Vilémovice was populated only by ethnic Germans, but since 1918 Czechs have also moved to the village. After World War II, the German-speaking inhabitants were expelled, but due to the unfavorable location of the village in the mountains, only a few Czechs repopulated the village. In 1976, the church burned down and was torn down.

== Demographics ==
Historical population

Year	Pop.	±%
1869	577	—
1880	584	+1.2%
1890	574	−1.7%
1900	508	−11.5%
1910	518	+2.0%

Year	Pop.	±%
1921	485	−6.4%
1930	452	−6.8%
1950	35	−92.3%
1961	102	+191.4%
1970	52	−49.0%

Year	Pop.	±%
1980	39	−25.0%
1991	15	−61.5%
2001	14	−6.7%
2011	21	+50.0%
2021	24	+14.3%

Source: Censuses

== Sights ==
There are no protected cultural monuments in the village area.
