= Grenzdorf =

Grenzdorf may refer to:

- Graniczna Wieś, a village in Pomeranian Voivodeship, in northern Poland
- Hraničky, a settlement located in Sudetenland, Czech Republic
- Grenzdorf (Ramin), a settlement in Ramin municipality in Mecklenburg-Vorpommern, Germany
