= Austrian Silesia =

Autonomous region of Bohemia and Austria (1742–1918)

Duchy of Upper and Lower Silesia Herzogtum Ober- und Niederschlesien (German) Gōrno a Dolno Ślōnski Firsztyntōm (Silesian) Vévodství Horní a Dolní Slezsko (Czech) Księstwo Górnego i Dolnego Śląska (Polish)
- 1742–1918
- Flag Coat of arms

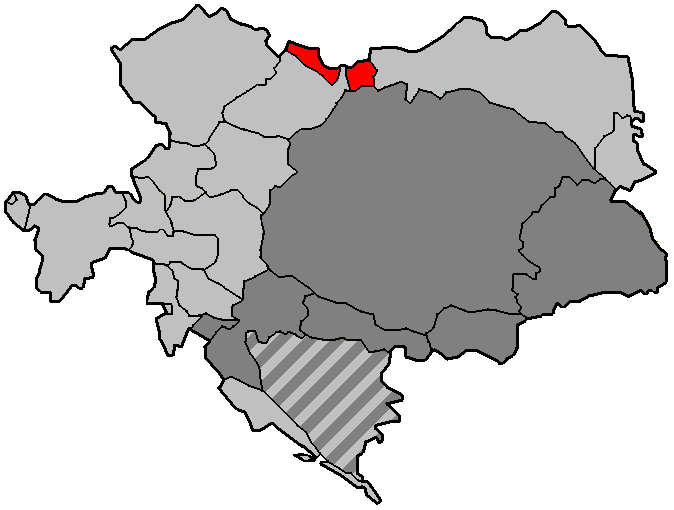
- Austrian Silesia (shown in red) within Austria-Hungary until 1918
- Status: Crown land of the Kingdom of Bohemia and: Habsburg monarchy (until 1804); Austrian Empire (1804–1867); Cisleithania, Austria-Hungary (from 1867)
- Capital: Troppau (Opava)
- Common languages: German; Polish; Czech
- Religion: Roman Catholicism; Lutheranism
- Government: Principality
- History
  - Division of Silesia: 1742
  - Part of Austrian Empire: 1804
  - Crown land of Cisleithania: 1867
  - Disestablished: 1918
Preceded by
| Duchies of Silesia |
Succeeded by
| Province of Silesia |
| Czech Silesia |
| Silesian Voivodeship (1920–1939) |
- Today part of: Czech Republic; Poland

Austrian Silesia, (Note: German: Österreichisch-Schlesien (historically also Oesterreichisch-Schlesien, Oesterreichisch Schlesien, österreichisch Schlesien); Czech: Rakouské Slezsko; Polish: Śląsk Austriacki) officially the Duchy of Upper and Lower Silesia, (Note: German: Herzogtum Ober- und Niederschlesien (historically Herzogthum Ober- und Niederschlesien); Czech: Vévodství Horní a Dolní Slezsko; Polish: Księstwo Górnego i Dolnego Śląska) was an autonomous region of the Kingdom of Bohemia and the Habsburg monarchy (from 1804 the Austrian Empire, and from 1867 the Cisleithanian portion of Austria-Hungary). It is largely coterminous with the present-day region of Czech Silesia (with a smaller part in Poland) and was, historically, part of the larger Silesia region.

== Geography ==
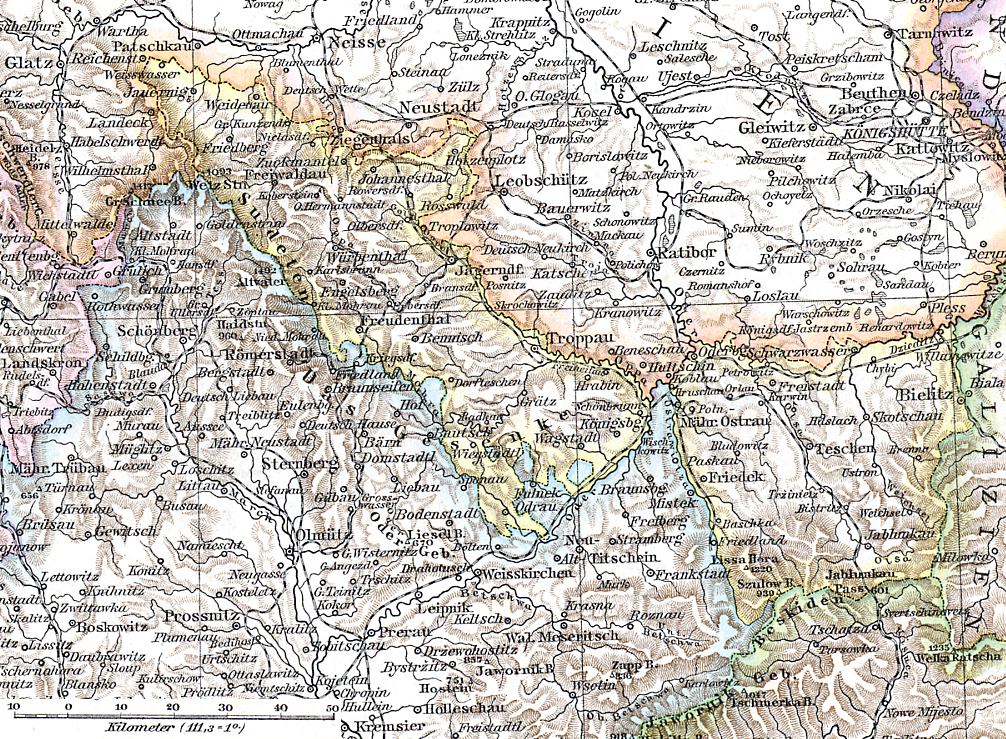
Austrian Silesia (outlined in yellow), Richard Andree, 1880

Austrian Silesia consisted of two territories, separated by the Moravian land strip of Moravská Ostrava between the Ostravice and Oder rivers.

The area east of the Ostravice around Cieszyn reached from the heights of the Western Carpathians (Silesian Beskids) in the south, where it bordered with the Kingdom of Hungary, along the Olza and upper Vistula rivers to the border with Prussian Silesia in the north. In the east the Biała river at Bielsko separated it from the Lesser Polish lands of the Polish–Lithuanian Commonwealth, incorporated into the Austrian Kingdom of Galicia and Lodomeria upon the First Partition of Poland in 1772.

The territory west of the Oder river stretching from the town of Opava up to Bílá Voda was confined by the Jeseníky mountain range of the eastern Sudetes in the south, separating it from Moravia, and the Opava river in the north. In the west the Golden Mountains formed the border with the County of Kladsko.

== History ==
The western and the eastern part of the area originally formed the south-eastern part of the Medieval Duchy of Silesia. The middle part was a part of Moravia. During the 14th century the Dukes of Silesia became vassals of the King of Bohemia. As part of the Lands of the Bohemian Crown, Silesia was inherited by the Habsburg Archduke Ferdinand I of Austria in 1526, after King Louis II of Bohemia had died at the Battle of Mohács. With the female succession of the Habsburg empress Maria Theresa to the throne in 1740, the Prussian king Frederick the Great laid claim to the Silesian province and, without waiting for any reply, on 16 December started the First Silesian War, thereby opening the larger War of the Austrian Succession. His campaign was concluded in 1742 with the Prussian victory at the Battle of Chotusitz leading to the treaties of Breslau and Berlin, in which Silesia was divided.

Composition of Austrian Silesia

Under the terms of the treaty, the Kingdom of Prussia received most of the territory including the Bohemian County of Kladsko, while only a small part of southeastern Silesia remained with the Habsburg monarchy, consisting of:

- the Upper Silesian duchy of Teschen (Cieszyn)
- parts of the former Moravian Duchy of Opava with Duchy of Krnov south of the Opava River, comprising several Moravian enclaves.
- the southern part of the Lower Silesian Duchy of Nysa around Jeseník

forming the Duchy of Upper and Lower Silesia, which remained a Bohemian crown land with its capital in the city of Opava. In 1766 the title of a Duke of Teschen was granted to Prince Albert of Saxony, son-in-law of Maria Theresa, while the title of a Duke of Troppau and Jägerndorf remained with the House of Liechtenstein. The Nysa territory was held by the Bishops of Wrocław with their residence at Castle Jánský Vrch (Johannisberg).

When in 1804 the Habsburg emperor Francis II established the Austrian Empire, his title would include the "Duke of Upper and Lower Silesia". Austrian Silesia was connected by rail with the Austrian capital Vienna, when the Emperor Ferdinand Northern Railway line was extended to Bohumín station in 1847. In the course of the Austro-Hungarian Compromise of 1867 the Duchy of Upper and Lower Silesia became a crown land of Cisleithanian Austria.

In November 1918 the Dual Monarchy was abolished. At the turn of the year 1918/1919 Czechoslovakian troops occupied the mainly German speaking region to prevent the formation of a regional government. The major part of Austrian Silesia was subsequently ceded to the newly created state of Czechoslovakia by the 1919 Treaty of Saint-Germain-en-Laye, with the exception of Cieszyn Silesia (the former Duchy of Teschen), which after the Polish–Czechoslovak War was split in 1920 along the Olza river with its eastern part falling to the Autonomous Silesian Voivodeship of Poland. Smaller parts of the duchy also became a part of Poland, while the adjacent Hlučín Region of Prussian Silesia fell to Czechoslovakia.

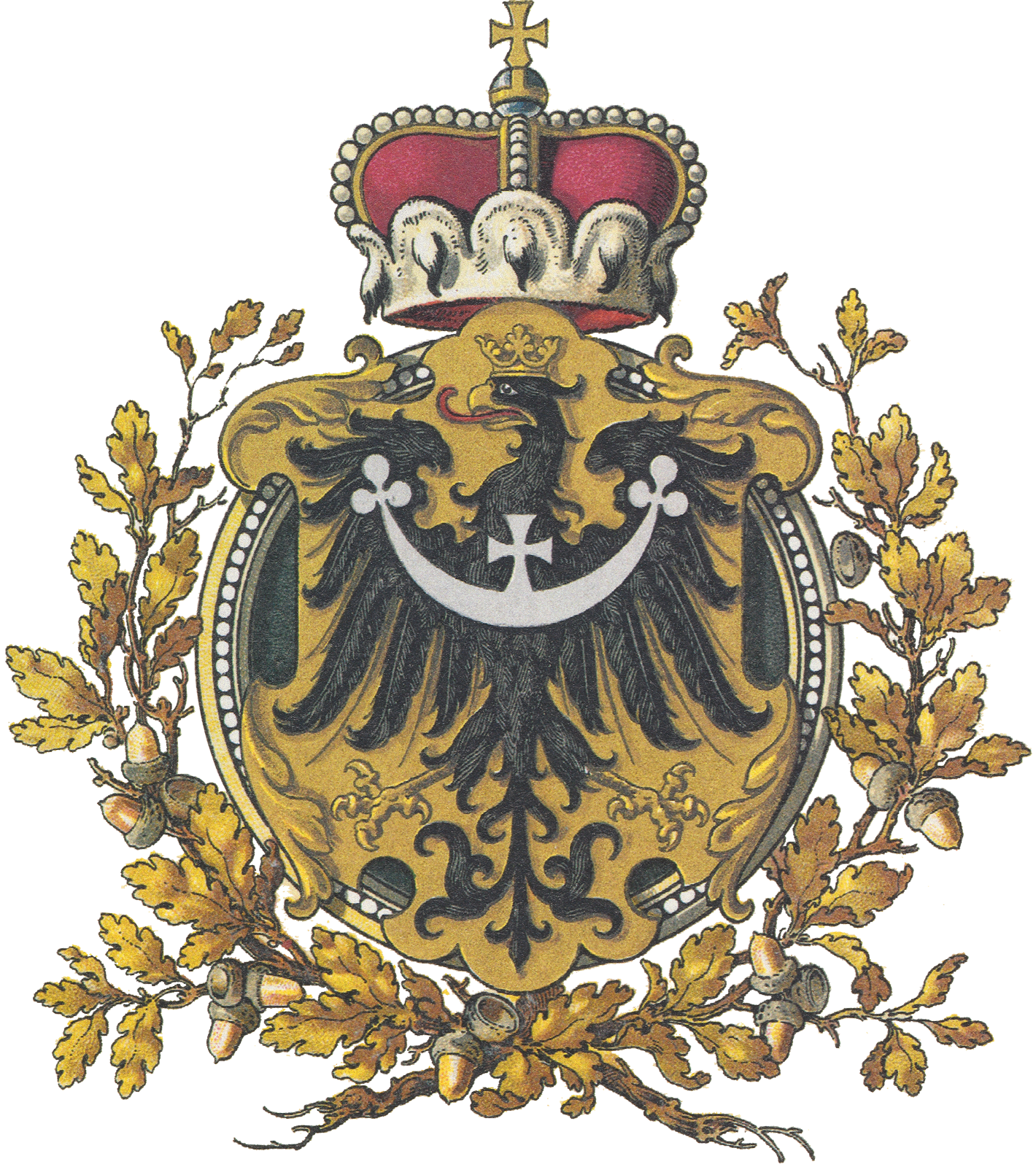
Coat of arms of the Duchy of Upper and Lower Silesia, as drawn by Hugo Gerard Ströhl (1851–1919)

== Demographics ==
According to an Austrian census, Austrian Silesia in 1910 was home to 756,949 people, speaking the following languages:

- 43% - German
- 31% - Polish
- 24% - Czech

=== Major towns ===
Towns with more than 5,000 people in 1880:

| Cities | German name | Population |
|---|---|---|
| Opava | Troppau | 20,563 |
| Bielsko | Bielitz | 13,060 |
| Cieszyn/Těšín | Teschen | 13,004 |
| Krnov | Jägerndorf | 11,792 |
| Bruntál | Freudenthal | 7,595 |
| Frýdek | Friedek | 7,374 (1890) |

=== Linguistic distribution (1851–1910) ===
| Year | Total | German | % | Polish | % | Czech | % | Other | % |
|---|---|---|---|---|---|---|---|---|---|
| 1851 | 438,569 | 209,512 | 47.8% | 138,243 | 31.5% | 88,068 | 20.1% | 2,746 | 0.6% |
| 1880 | 565,475 | 269,338 | 47.6% | 154,887 | 27.4% | 126,385 | 22.4% | 14,865 | 2.6% |
| 1890 | 605,649 | 281,555 | 46.5% | 178,114 | 29.4% | 129,814 | 21.4% | 16,166 | 2.7% |
| 1900 | 680,422 | 296,571 | 43.6% | 220,472 | 32.4% | 146,265 | 21.5% | 17,114 | 2.5% |
| 1910 | 756,949 | 325,530 | 43.0% | 235,224 | 31.1% | 180,341 | 23.8% | 15,854 | 2.1% |

=== Linguistic distribution by district (1910) ===
| District (Bezirk) | Polish name | Czech name | Area (km^{2}) | Population | German | % | Polish | % | Czech | % | Other | % |
|---|---|---|---|---|---|---|---|---|---|---|---|---|
| Bielitz (Land) | Bielsko | Bílsko | 758.13 | 82,835 | 17,631 | 21.3% | 63,580 | 76.8% | 663 | 0.8% | 961 | 1.2% |
| Bielitz (Stadt) | Bielsko | Bílsko | 4.97 | 18,568 | 15,144 | 81.6% | 2,568 | 13.8% | 136 | 0.7% | 720 | 3.9% |
| Freistadt | Frysztat | Fryštát | 316.89 | 122,030 | 15,159 | 12.4% | 75,462 | 61.8% | 28,103 | 23.0% | 3,306 | 2.7% |
| Freiwaldau | Frywałdów | Frývaldov | 736.38 | 68,823 | 66,855 | 97.1% | 66 | 0.1% | 62 | 0.1% | 1,840 | 2.7% |
| Freudenthal | Bruntal | Bruntál | 591.65 | 49,306 | 48,852 | 99.1% | 41 | 0.1% | 49 | 0.1% | 364 | 0.7% |
| Friedek (Land) | Frydek | Frýdek | 461.71 | 98,957 | 6,821 | 6.9% | 14,519 | 14.7% | 76,458 | 77.3% | 1,159 | 1.2% |
| Friedek (Stadt) | Frydek | Frýdek | 10.23 | 9,879 | 5,123 | 51.9% | 574 | 5.8% | 4,033 | 40.8% | 149 | 1.5% |
| Jägerndorf | Karniów | Krnov | 532.20 | 60,785 | 58,133 | 95.6% | 22 | 0.0% | 275 | 0.5% | 2,355 | 3.9% |
| Teschen | Cieszyn | Těšín | 730.38 | 102,552 | 17,045 | 16.6% | 77,147 | 75.2% | 6,204 | 6.0% | 2,156 | 2.1% |
| Troppau (Land) | Opawa | Opava | 642.10 | 66,990 | 33,200 | 49.6% | 560 | 0.8% | 32,006 | 47.8% | 1,224 | 1.8% |
| Troppau (Stadt) | Opawa | Opava | 10.93 | 30,762 | 27,240 | 88.6% | 274 | 0.9% | 2,039 | 6.6% | 1,209 | 3.9% |
| Wagstadt | Biełowiec | Bílovec | 351.44 | 45,462 | 14,327 | 31.5% | 411 | 0.9% | 30,313 | 66.7% | 411 | 0.9% |
| Total | | | 5147.01 | 756,949 | 325,530 | 43.0% | 235,224 | 31.1% | 180,341 | 23.8% | 15,854 | 2.1% |

=== Administration ===
Teschner Kreis/Těšínský kraj c. 1844

The Duchy of Upper and Lower Silesia was originally divided into the two districts/'circles' (Kreise, Czech: kraje) of Teschen (Kreis Teschen/Teschner Kreis, Těšínský kraj, pop. 213,040 in 1847) and Troppau (Kreis Troppau/Troppauer Kreis, Opavský kraj, pop. 260,199) with its seat at Krnov. In eastern Teschen, the autonomous Duchy of Bielsko was established in 1754. From 1784 it was administered with Moravia (Moravia-Silesia), with its Kreise subordinate to the Moravo-Silesian Gubernium in Brünn. Following the Revolutions of 1848, Austrian Silesia was separated administratively from Moravia, its Kreise and the Duchy of Bielsko were disbanded and it was re-organised into political districts (Bezirke or Bezirkshauptmannschaften). The first division consisted of seven districts – Troppau, Freiwaldau, Jägerndorf, Freudenthal, Teschen, Friedek and Bielitz – which were each constituted from several judicial districts (Gerichtsbezirke).

In Bach's reforms of 1854 it was reorganised into 22 districts or Amtsbezirke (distinct from the political districts listed above, rather corresponding to the judicial districts (Gerichtsbezirke)) plus the statutory city of Troppau:

1. Jauernig (Javorník)
2. Weidenau (Vidnava)
3. Freiwaldau (Frývaldov)
4. Zuckmantel (Cukmantl)
5. Hotzenplotz (Osoblaha)
6. Olbersdorf (Město Albrechtice)
7. Jägerndorf (Krnov)
8. Freudenthal (Bruntál)
9. Benisch (Horní Benešov)
10. Troppau (Opava)
11. Wigstadtl (Vítkov)
12. Odrau (Odry)
13. Wagstadt (Bílovec)
14. Königsberg (Klimkovice)
15. Oderberg (Bohumín)
16. Friedeck (Frýdek)
17. Freistadt (Fryštát)
18. Teschen (Cieszyn/Těšín)
19. Jablunkau (Jablunkov)
20. Schwarzwasser (Černá Voda)
21. Skotschau (Skoczów/Skočov)
22. Bielitz (Bielsko).

These districts were grouped into five Bezirksämter ('district offices'):

- The Landesgericht in Troppau, covering the city and district of Troppau and the districts of Wigstadtl, Odrau, Wagstadt and Königsberg
- Jauernig: Jauernig, Weidenau, Freiwaldau and Zuckmantel districts
- Jägerndorf: Jägerndorf, Hotzeplotz, Olbersdorf, Benisch and Freudenthal districts
- Teschen: Teschen, Oderberg, Friedek, Freistadt and Jablunkau districts
- Bielitz: Bielitz, Schwarzwasser and Skotschau districts

Judicially the Landesgericht in Troppau and Kreisgericht in Teschen remained separate, each covering one of the two disconnected parts of the crown land.

In 1860 administrative responsibility for Silesia returned to the Moravian Statthalterei in Brünn/Brno; however, it remained a formally separate crown land and its administrative divisions remained unchanged.

Administrative divisions of Silesia as a crown land of Austria in 1900

Following the compromise of 1867 the political districts were re-established and continued in some form until Austria-Hungary's dissolution, with the following districts used at various times:

- Bielitz (Bielsko)
- Freistadt (Fryštát)
- Freiwaldau (Frývaldov)
- Freudenthal (Bruntál)
- Friedek (Frýdek)
- Jägerndorf (Krnov)
- Teschen (Cieszyn/Těšín)
- Troppau (Opava)
- Wagstadt (Bílovec).

For example, in 1900, there were 8 Bezirkshauptmannschaften in Austrian Silesia (in comparison to above list without Frydek).
