= Bílý Potok (Javorník) =

- Village
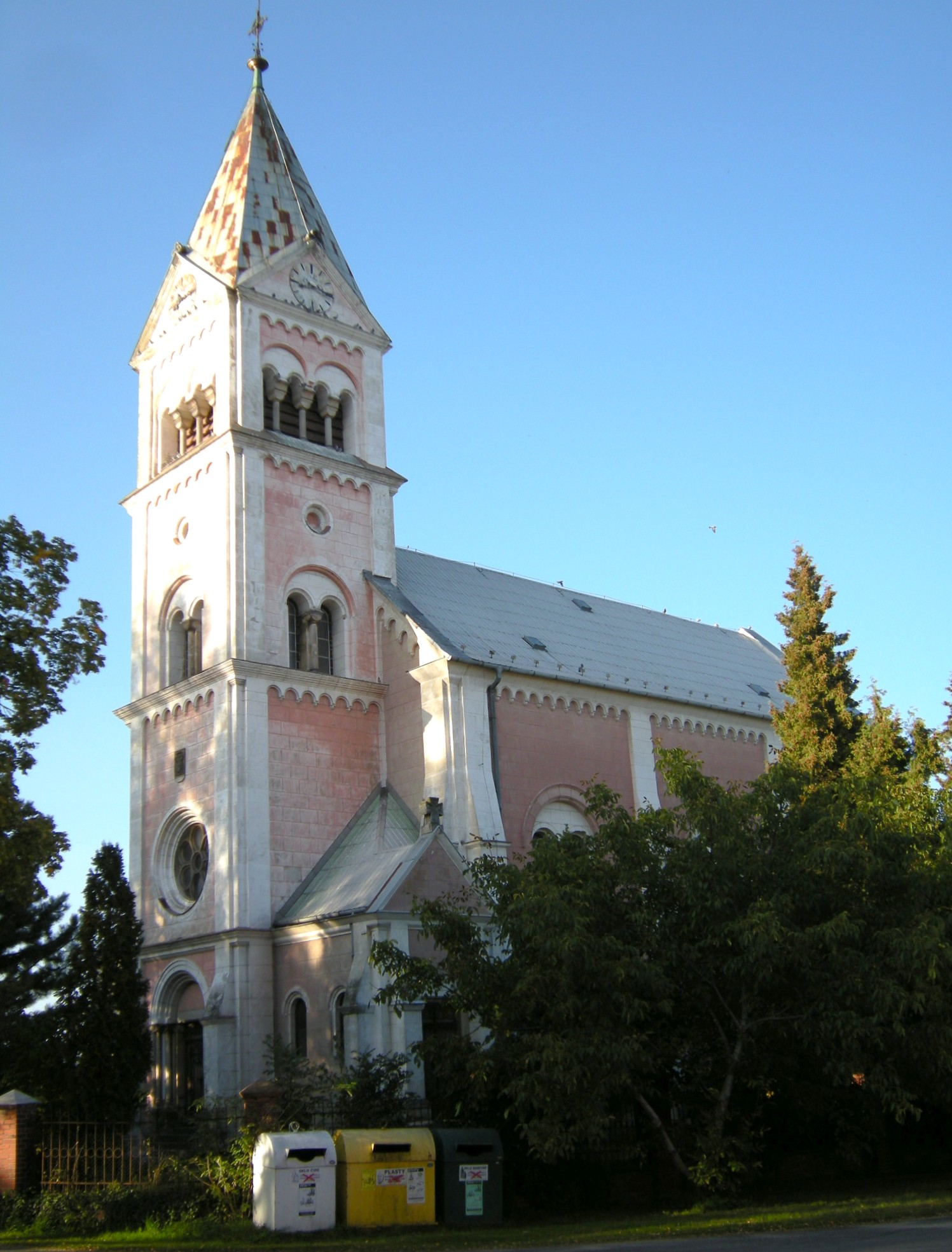
- Church or Saint Lawrence

- Location in the Czech Republic
- Coordinates: 50°24′41″N 16°59′41″E
- Country: Czech Republic
- Region: Olomouc
- District: Jeseník
- Municipality: Javorník
- First mentioned: 1310

Area
  - Total: 12.01 km^{2} (4.64 sq mi)
- Elevation: 287 m (942 ft)

Population (2021)
  - Total: 219
  - Density: 18.2/km^{2} (47.2/sq mi)
- Time zone: UTC+1 (CET)
  - Summer (DST): UTC+2 (CEST)
- Postal code: 790 70

Bílý Potok (German: Weissbach) is a village and administrative part of Javorník in the Olomouc Region of the Czech Republic. It is located in the foothills of Golden Mountains. As of census 2011, it had 230 inhabitants. The village include the nearby hamlet of Kohout.

== History ==
The Church or Saint Lawrence was built in 1893–1895. Bílý Potok was a separate municipality until 1976, when it was merged with Javorník.

== Notable people ==
- Rudolf Rittner (1869–1943), German actor
