= Horní Hoštice (Javorník) =

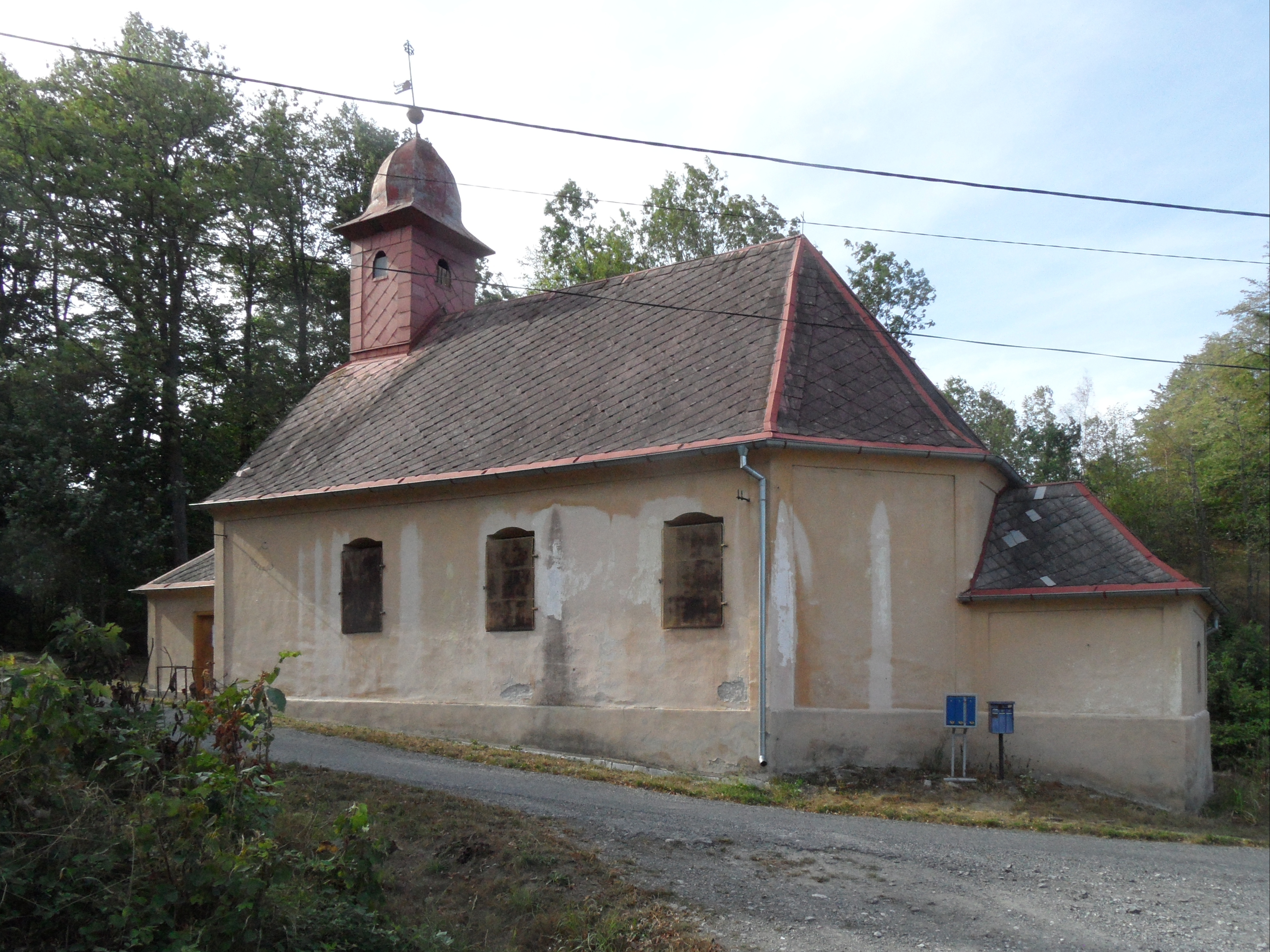
- Church of Saint John of Nepomuk in Horní Hoštice

- Location within Czech Republic
- Coordinates: 50°25′N 16°57′E
- Country: Czech Republic
- Region: Olomouc
- District: Jeseník
- First mentioned: ca. 1295
- Elevation: 311 m (1,020 ft)
- Time zone: UTC+1 (CET)
  - Summer (DST): UTC+2 (CEST)

Horní Hoštice (Polish: Gościce Górne, German: Ober Gostitz) is a small village and part of the town of Javorník in the Olomouc Region in Czech Republic. It is located in the foothills of the Golden Mountains in the Sudetes, on the border with Poland.

== History ==
The village was first mentioned in the Liber fundationis episcopatus Vratislaviensis from around 1295, when it was part of the Duchy of Nysa within fragmented Piast-ruled Poland. Later on, the duchy passed under Bohemian (Czech) suzerainty. After the 18th-century Silesian Wars, the newly-drawn border divided the village in two. The present-day Czech village Horní Hoštice remained within the Duchy of Nysa under Bohemian suzerainty, while the present-day Polish village Gościce fell to Prussia. Following the duchy's dissolution in 1850, Horní Hoštice was incorporated directly into Bohemia, and after World War I, from 1918, it formed part of Czechoslovakia. According to Statistik des Deutschen Reichs, Band 450; Teil II - Sudetendeutsche Gebiete und Memelland Horní Hoštice had 394 inhabitants in 1930 and 375 in 1939.

During the German occupation (World War II), the occupiers operated a forced labour subcamp of the Stalag VIII-B/344 prisoner-of-war camp in the village. After the war, the remaining German-speaking population was expelled in accordance to the Potsdam Agreement and the village was restored to Czechoslovakia.
