= The Merry Vineyard =

The Merry Vineyard (German:Der fröhliche Weinberg) may refer to:

- The Merry Vineyard (play), a play by Carl Zuckmayer
- The Merry Vineyard (1927 film), a German silent film
- The Merry Vineyard (1952 film), a West German film
