= Joseph Christian Freiherr von Zedlitz =

Austrian dramatist and epic poet (1790–1862)

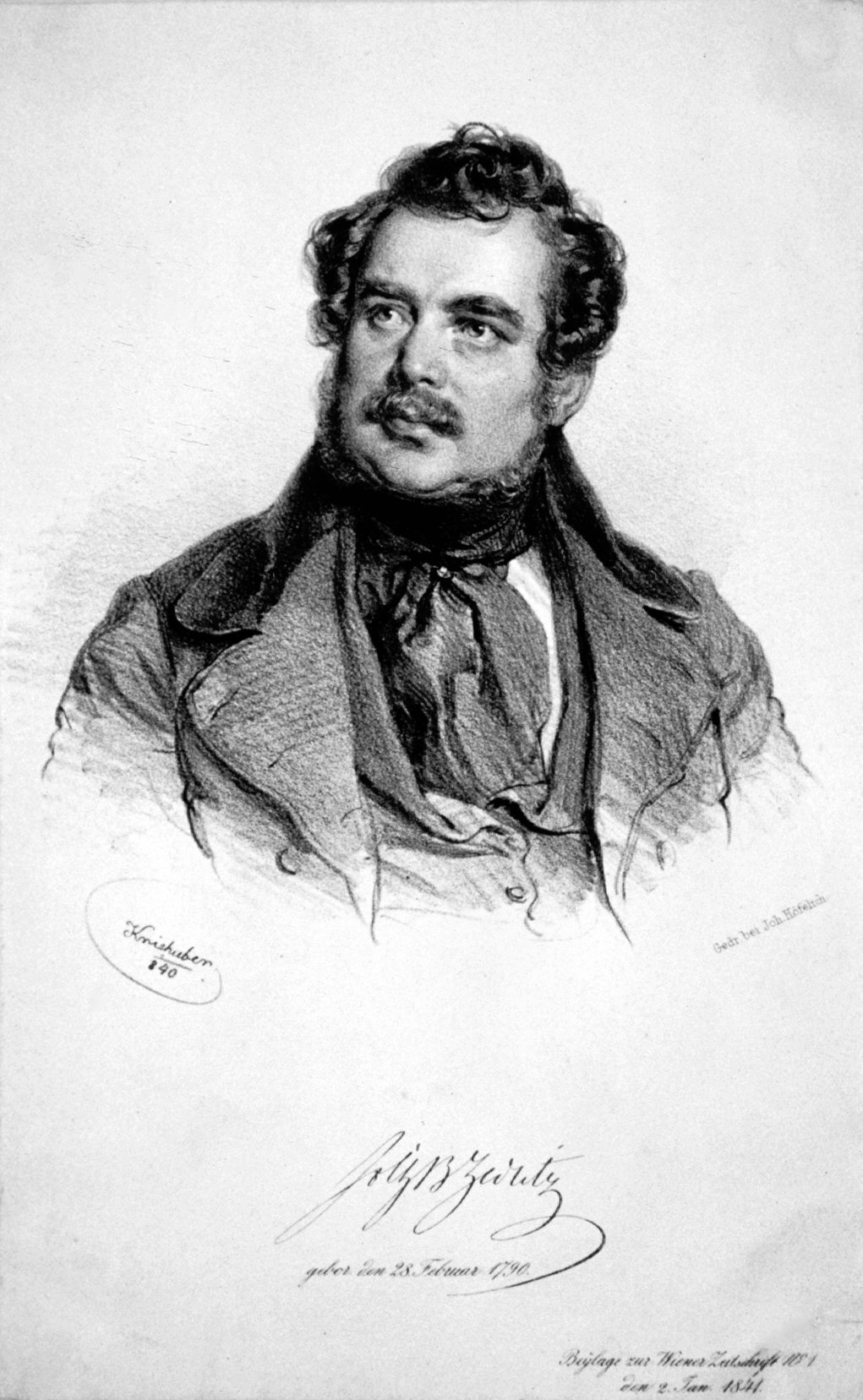
Joseph Christian Freiherr von Zedlitz

Joseph Christian Freiherr von Zedlitz (February 28, 1790 in Jánský Vrch Castle, Javorník [today in the Czech Republic] – March 16, 1862 in Vienna, Austria) was an Austrian dramatist and epic poet.

His wife died 1836, and 1837 he was nominated by the foreign service to work for the Foreign Office. He was sent as representative of the Austrian imperial court to the principalities of Sachsen-Weimar-Eisenach, Nassau, Braunschweig, Oldenburg and Reuss.

He was also a good friend of Joseph Freiherr von Eichendorff.

== Works ==
- Todtenkränze, 1828
- Gedichte, 1832, 1859
- Soldaten-Büchlein, 2 Bände, 1849/50. – Kerker und Krone, 1834 (Drama)
- Über die orientalische Frage, 1840 (politische Flugschrift)
- Übersetzungen (Lord Byron). – Ausgabe: Dramatische Werke, 4 Bände, 1830–36

== See also ==
- List of Austrian writers
