= Gościce =

- Village
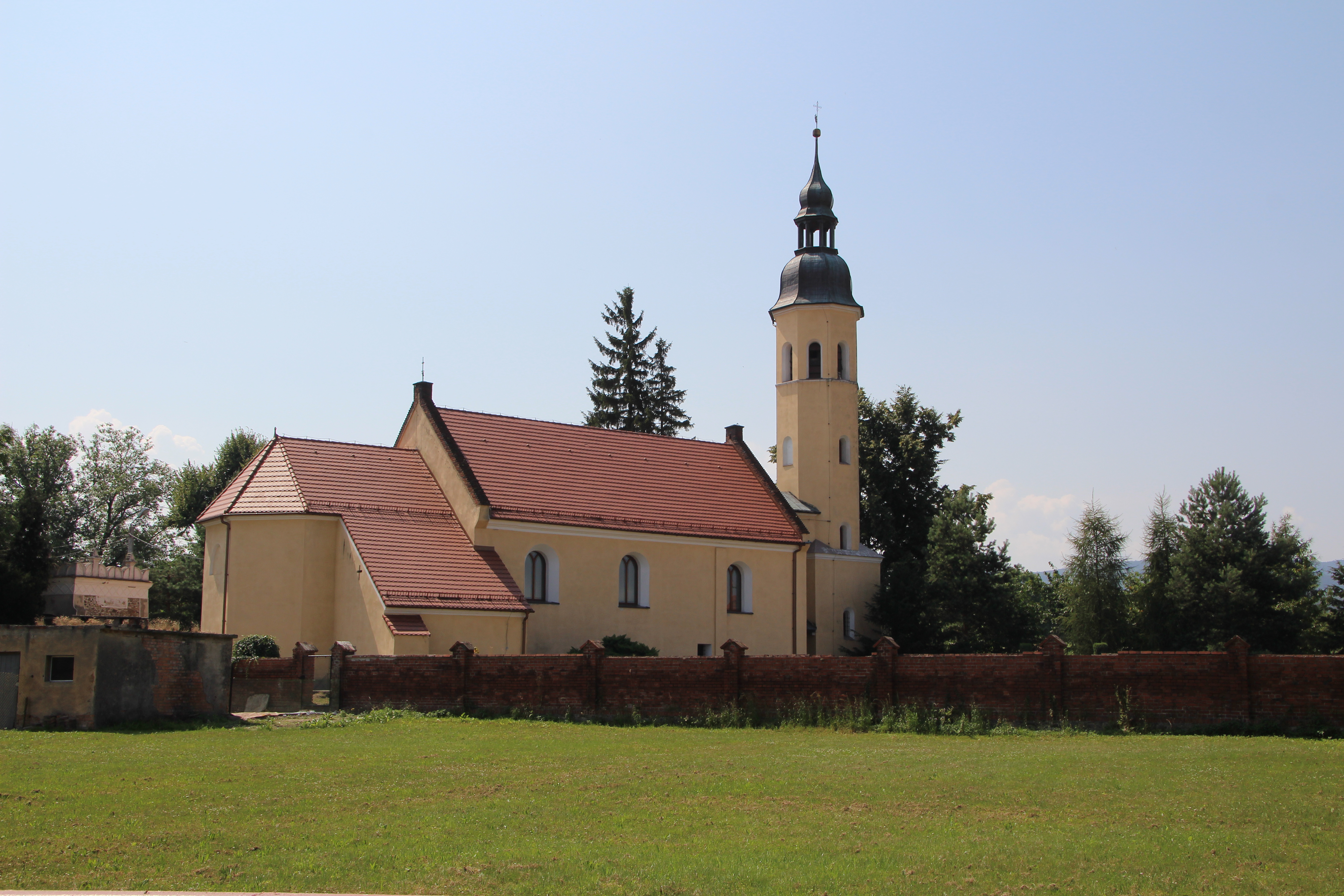
- Saint Nicholas church in Gościce

- Location within Poland
- Coordinates: 50°26′8″N 16°58′59″E
- Country: Poland
- Voivodeship: Opole
- County: Nysa
- Gmina: Paczków
- First mentioned: ca. 1295

Population (2023)
  - Total: 470
- Vehicle registration: ONY

Gościce Polish: [ɡɔɕˈt͡ɕit͡sɛ] (German: Gostitz) is a village in the administrative district of Gmina Paczków, within Nysa County, Opole Voivodeship, in south-western Poland, close to the Czech border, where neighboring Horní Hoštice is located.

== History ==
The village was first mentioned in the Liber fundationis episcopatus Vratislaviensis from around 1295, when it was part of the Duchy of Nysa within fragmented Piast-ruled Poland. Later on, the duchy passed under Bohemian (Czech) suzerainty within the Holy Roman Empire. After the 18th-century Silesian Wars, the newly drawn border divided the village in two. The present-day Polish village Gościce fell to Prussia, while the present-day Czech village Horní Hoštice remained within the Duchy of Nysa under Bohemian suzerainty. In 1936, during a massive Nazi campaign of renaming of placenames, the village was renamed to Gostal to erase traces of Polish origin. After the defeat of Germany in the war, in 1945, the village became again part of Poland and its historic name was restored. The division between Gościce and Horní Hoštice continued through the Communist era of 1945–1990, and the border was not easily crossed until Poland and the Czech Republic joined the Schengen Area in 2007.
