= Javorník (Jeseník District) =

- Town
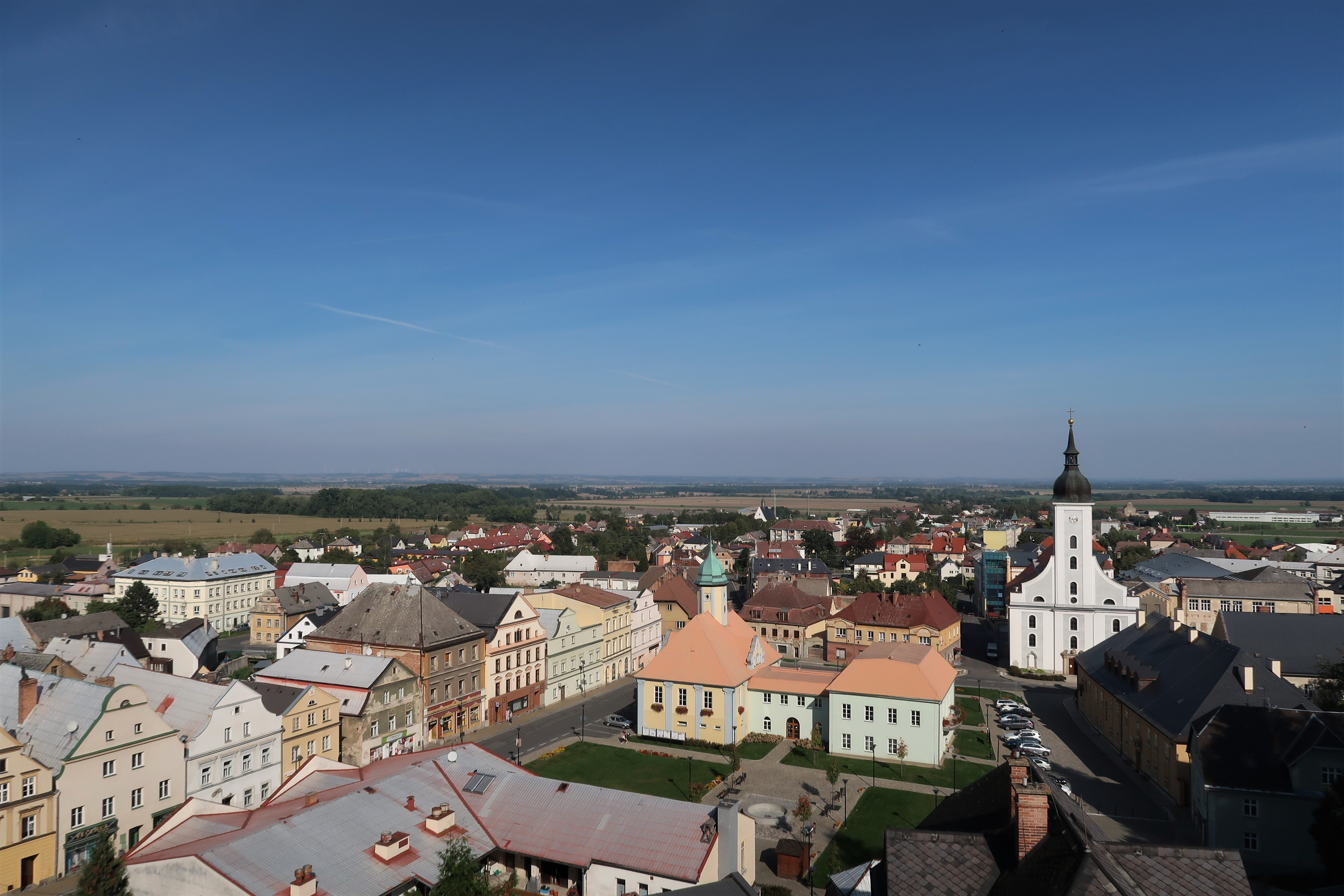
- Centre of Javorník

- Flag Coat of arms

- Location in the Czech Republic
- Coordinates: 50°23′27″N 17°0′10″E
- Country: Czech Republic
- Region: Olomouc
- District: Jeseník
- First mentioned: 1290

Government
  - Mayor: Irena Karešová

Area
  - Total: 77.48 km^{2} (29.92 sq mi)
- Elevation: 295 m (968 ft)

Population (2026-01-01)
  - Total: 2,544
  - Density: 32.83/km^{2} (85.04/sq mi)
- Time zone: UTC+1 (CET)
  - Summer (DST): UTC+2 (CEST)
- Postal code: 790 70
- Website: www.mestojavornik.cz

Javorník (Czech pronunciation: [ˈjavorɲiːk]; German: Jauernig) is a town in Jeseník District in the Olomouc Region of the Czech Republic. It has about 2,500 inhabitants. The town proper is located on the stream Javornický potok in the Golden Mountains.

Javorník was founded in the 13th century. The historic town centre is well preserved and is protected as an urban monument zone. The most important monument is the Jánský Vrch Castle, which is protected as a national cultural monument.

== Administrative division ==
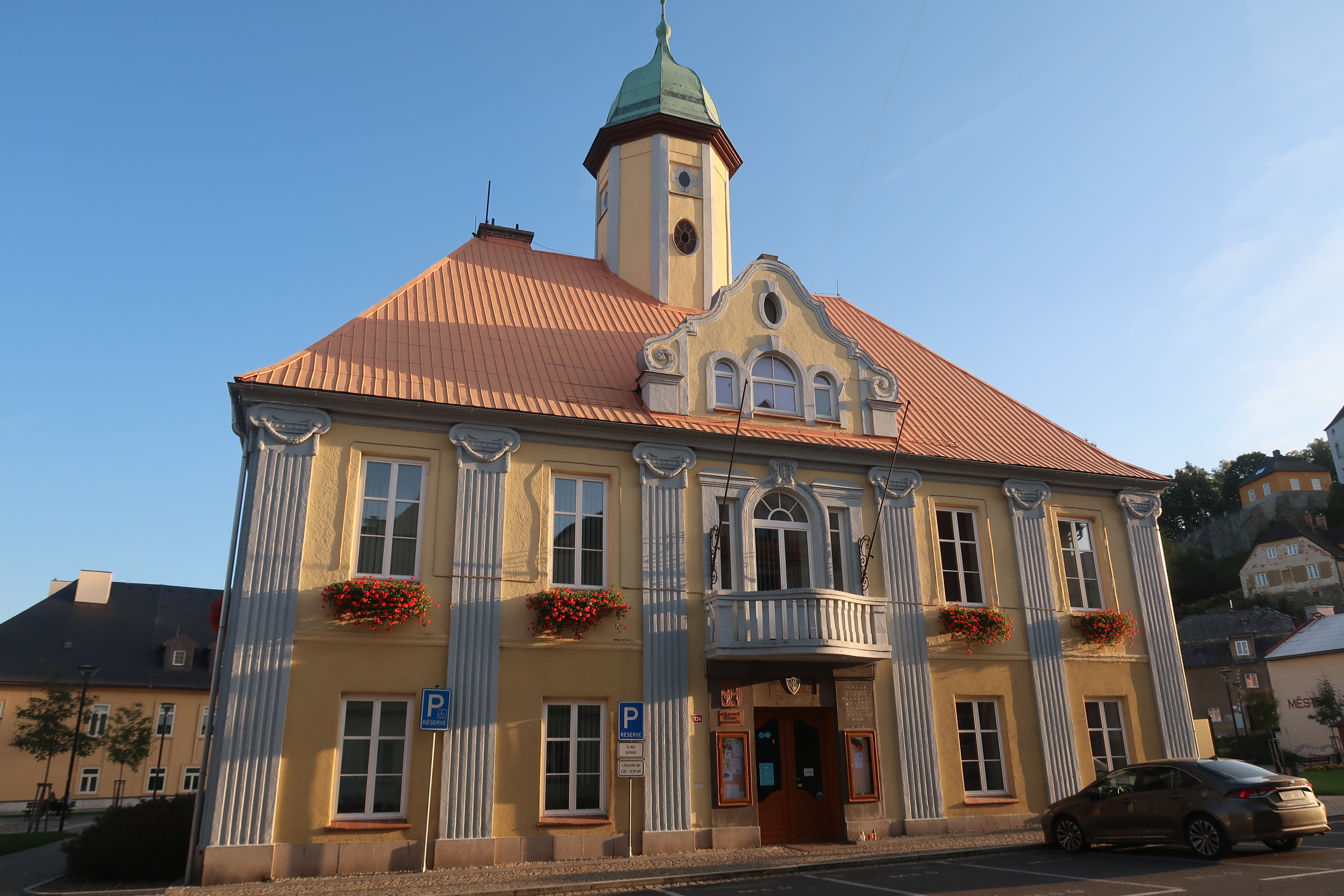
Town hall

Javorník consists of five municipal parts (in brackets population according to the 2021 census):

- Javorník (2,140)
- Bílý Potok (219)
- Horní Hoštice (54)
- Travná (56)
- Zálesí (25)

== Etymology ==
The town's name is derived from the Czech word javor, i.e. 'maple'.

== Geography ==
Javorník is located about 23 kilometres (14 mi) northwest of Jeseník and 90 km (56 mi) north of Olomouc, on the border with Poland. The town proper is situated in the valley of the stream Javornický potok.

The larger part of the municipal territory lies in the Golden Mountains, only the eastern part lies in the Vidnava Lowland. The highest point is the mountain Borůvková hora at 899 m (2,949 ft) above sea level, located on the Czech–Polish border.

== History ==
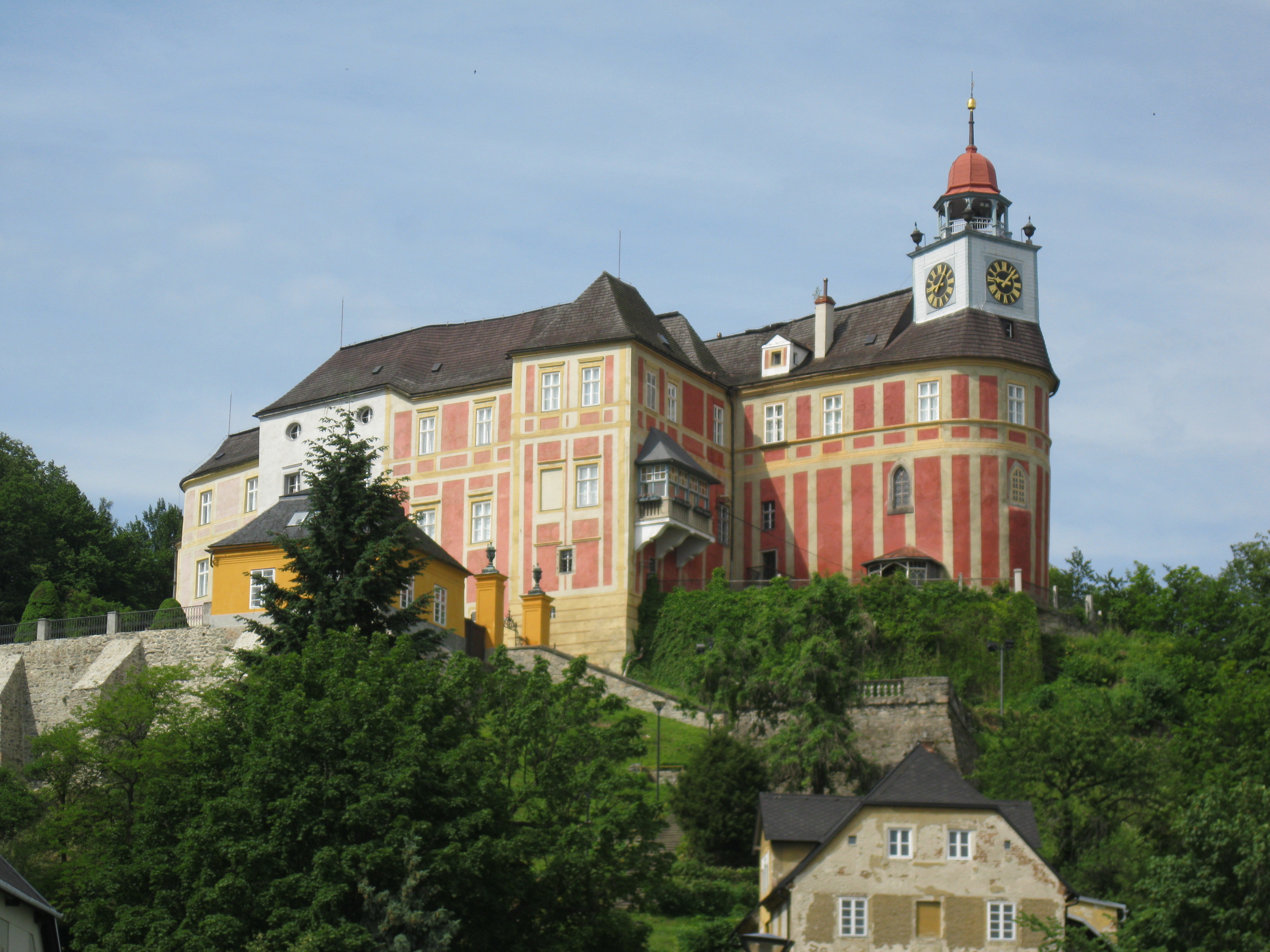
Jánský Vrch Castle

=== 13th–14th centuries ===
The first written mention of Javorník is from 1290. However, it was probably established earlier, because the Church of the Holy Cross dates from the 1260s. A medieval fortress was built here at the turn of the 13th and 14th century and was first mentioned in 1307. The village and then the castle were owned by the Bishopric in Wrocław. Part of the settlement in the castle grounds gradually took on an urban character, and in 1373 Javorník was first mentioned as a town, although it was not granted town privileges until 1549.

=== 15th–17th centuries ===
In 1428, during the Hussite Wars, Javorník and its fortress were conquered by the Hussites, who held it until 1432. In 1432, Javorník was returned to the bishops of Wrocław. In 1509, when Prince-Bishop Johann V Thurzo came to power, new development occurred. He had rebuilt the fortress into a Renaissance castle, known as Jánský Vrch Castle. He also helped develop silver mining and establish hammer mills in the area.

In 1576, most of the houses were destroyed by a fire. Worse disasters came in the 17th century, when the town was hit by Swedish incursions during the Thirty Years' War and the plague epidemic. However, the town soon recovered, even though it was considered ugly. Unlike other towns in the area, Javorník avoided Northern Moravia witch trials.

=== 18th–19th centuries ===
In the 1720s, new representative building were built in Javorník, which reflected economic prosperity. The development of the town was stopped by the Silesian Wars. After the Prussian victory in the First Silesian War in 1742, Habsburg monarchy lost nearly all of its Silesian possessions. However, Javorník together with the so-called Bohemian Silesia remained under Habsburg control. After the Seven Years' War, during the rule of Prince-Bishop Philipp Gotthard of Schaffgotsch, a new prosperous period for the town began. In 1767, he moved his court on the Jánský Vrch and Javorník became not only the administrative centre, but also the cultural centre of Upper Silesia. Schaffgotsch hosted here many artistic personalities, the most famous was Carl Ditters von Dittersdorf.

After Schaffgotsch's death in 1795, Javorník partially lost its importance, but remained economic centre with developed crafts and textile manufactories. In 1825 a devastating fire once again ravaged the town. Javorník was recovering only slowly and never regained the same importance in the region as it had during the golden age in the second half of the 18th century. Most of the manufacturies never fully recovered. In 1897, the local railway was built, which helped to create various smaller businesses.

=== 20th century ===
According to the Austro-Hungarian census of 1910, the town had 2,052 inhabitants, 1,956 of whom had permanent residence there and were German-speaking. Most populous religious group were Roman Catholics with 2,019 (98.4%).

During World War II, approximately 30 French and Soviet POWs were interned at the old town prison in Javorník. Other and larger prisoner-of-war camps were located in Zálesí, Travná, and in the hamlet of Račí údolí.

From 1938 to 1945 it was annexed by Nazi Germany and adminitered as part of the Reichsgau Sudetenland. By 1938, local ethnic-German population became overwhelmingly pro-Nazi with many locals joining the Sudetendeutsches Freikorps, a para-military Nazi-Germany sponsored and trained organisation that was conducting terrorist attacks against the Czechoslovak authorities. One of the most notable attacks of the Freikorps in the town took place on 22 September 1938. A group of 12 members of the Czechoslovak Border Guard was retreating through the town after being attacked from Germany when it was ambushed by over 100 local members of Freikorps. The Czechoslovak soldiers were disarmed and abducted to Germany where they were interned by local authorities in the concentration camp in Paczków.

After 1945, under the Beneš decrees most Sudeten Germans were held at several internment camps and then expelled. Many of them were also beaten and killed by numerous militias and paramilitary groups with strong ties to the Communist Party and the Red Army. The town was repopulated by Czech families.

Following the Communist coup d'état of 1948, Czechoslovak government confiscated most of the property which belonged to the Archdiocese of Wrocław, their forests were divided among state-owned enterprises. No larger company remained in Javorník.

== Demographics ==
Historical population

Year	Pop.	±%
1869	5,816	—
1880	5,975	+2.7%
1890	5,770	−3.4%
1900	5,336	−7.5%
1910	5,102	−4.4%

Year	Pop.	±%
1921	5,099	−0.1%
1930	5,127	+0.5%
1950	2,651	−48.3%
1961	3,240	+22.2%
1970	3,086	−4.8%

Year	Pop.	±%
1980	2,948	−4.5%
1991	3,018	+2.4%
2001	2,947	−2.4%
2011	2,798	−5.1%
2021	2,494	−10.9%

Source: Censuses

== Economy ==
By the mid-1960s, the only major employers in Javorník were a small manufacturer of metal furniture and a company producing stuffed toys. As the social conditions in the town continued to deteriorate, in the 1980s the Communist government decided to build here a subsidiary of MEZ Postřelmov (electrical engineering plants). After the Velvet Revolution in 1989, the company found it hard to compete in the new economic environment and closed down in the early 1990s. At present, the economy relies mainly on tourism.

== Transport ==
The I/60 road from Jeseník to the Czech–Polish border runs through the town. There is the Bílý potok / Paczków road border crossing.

Javorník is the starting point and terminus of the railway line of local importance from Lipová-lázně.

== Sights ==
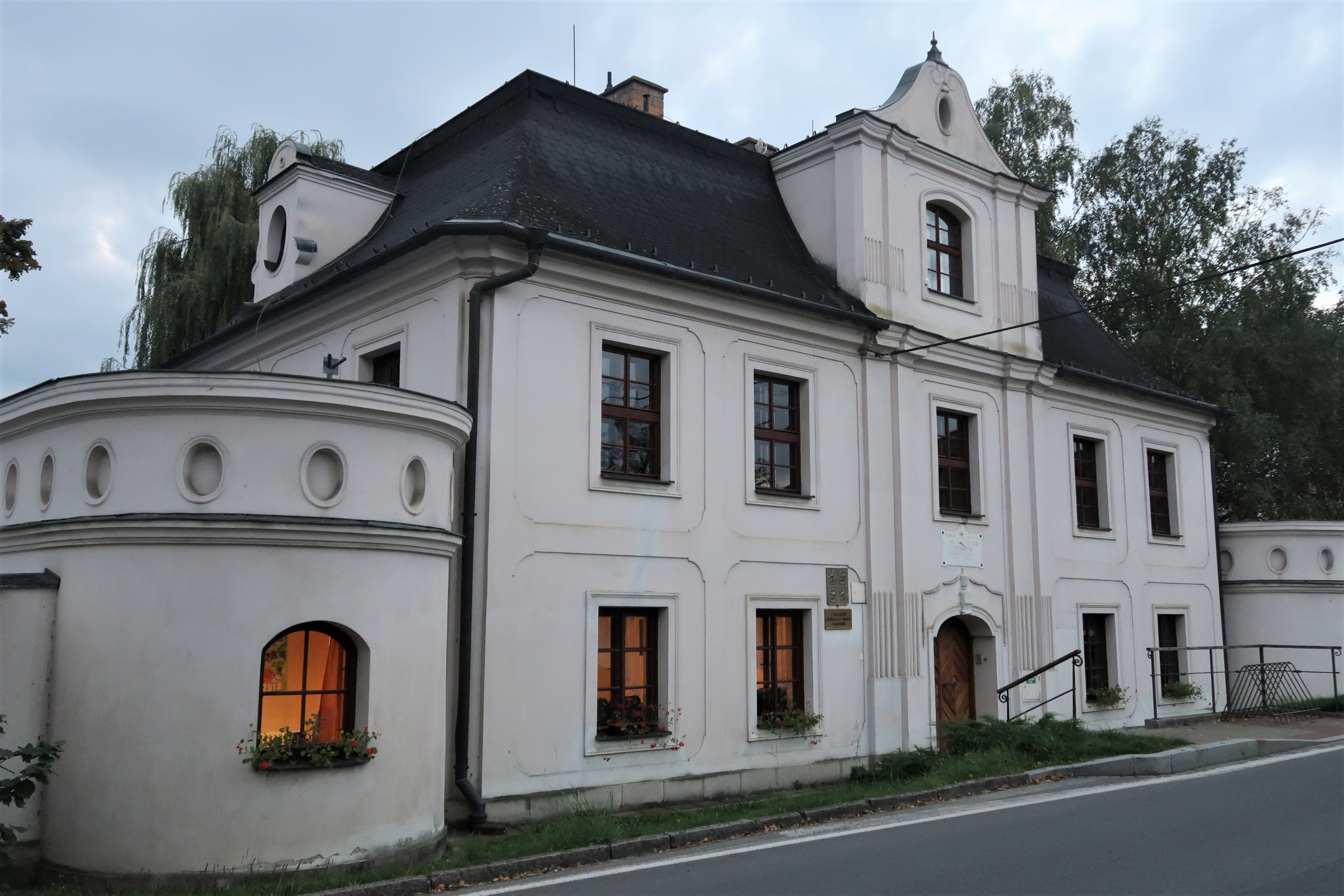
Ditters' House

The complex of the Jánský Vrch Castle is the main landmark of the town, protected as a national cultural monument. The castle is open to the public. It contains one of the largest collections of smoking pipes in the Czech lands and a collection of curtains and net curtains.

The main landmark of the town square is the Church of the Holy Trinity. It was built in the Baroque style in 1716–1718. The early Gothic cemetery Church of the Holy Cross dates from the first half of the 13th century.

The town hall on the town square is a pseudo-Mannerist house from the early 20th century. Other valuable buildings in the town centre are burgher houses from the 19th century with medieval cores, mostly in the Mannerist and Empire styles.

The Neoclassical monument of Carl Ditters von Dittersdorf dates from 1793. It was built as a thank you to Count Philipp Gotthard von Schaffgotsch for the establishment of the Jánský vrch settlement. The Ditters' House from the 1780s is also an architectural monument. Today this late Baroque building houses a primary art school.

== Notable people ==
- Philipp Gotthard von Schaffgotsch (1716–1795), German count, Prince-Bishop of Wrocław
- Carl Ditters von Dittersdorf (1739–1799), composer; Kapellmeister at Jánský Vrch in 1770–1794
- Johann Nepomuk Rust (1775–1840), Austrian surgeon
- Joseph Freiherr von Eichendorff (1788–1857), German poet; stayed at Jánský Vrch in 1856–1857
- Joseph Christian Freiherr von Zedlitz (1790–1862), Austrian writer and poet
- Melchior von Diepenbrock (1798–1853), cardinal, Prince-Bishop of Wrocław; died here
- Robert Theer (1808–1863), Austrian painter and lithographer
- Adolf Theer (1811–1868), Austrian painter and lithographer
- Albert Theer (1815–1902), Austrian painter and lithographer
- Emil Sax (1845–1927), economist
- Adolf Bertram (1859–1945), German cardinal, Archbishop of Wrocław; died in Jánský Vrch and was buried here

== Twin towns – sister cities ==
Javorník is twinned with:

- Otmuchów, Poland
- Złoty Stok, Poland
