= Rudolf Rittner =

German actor

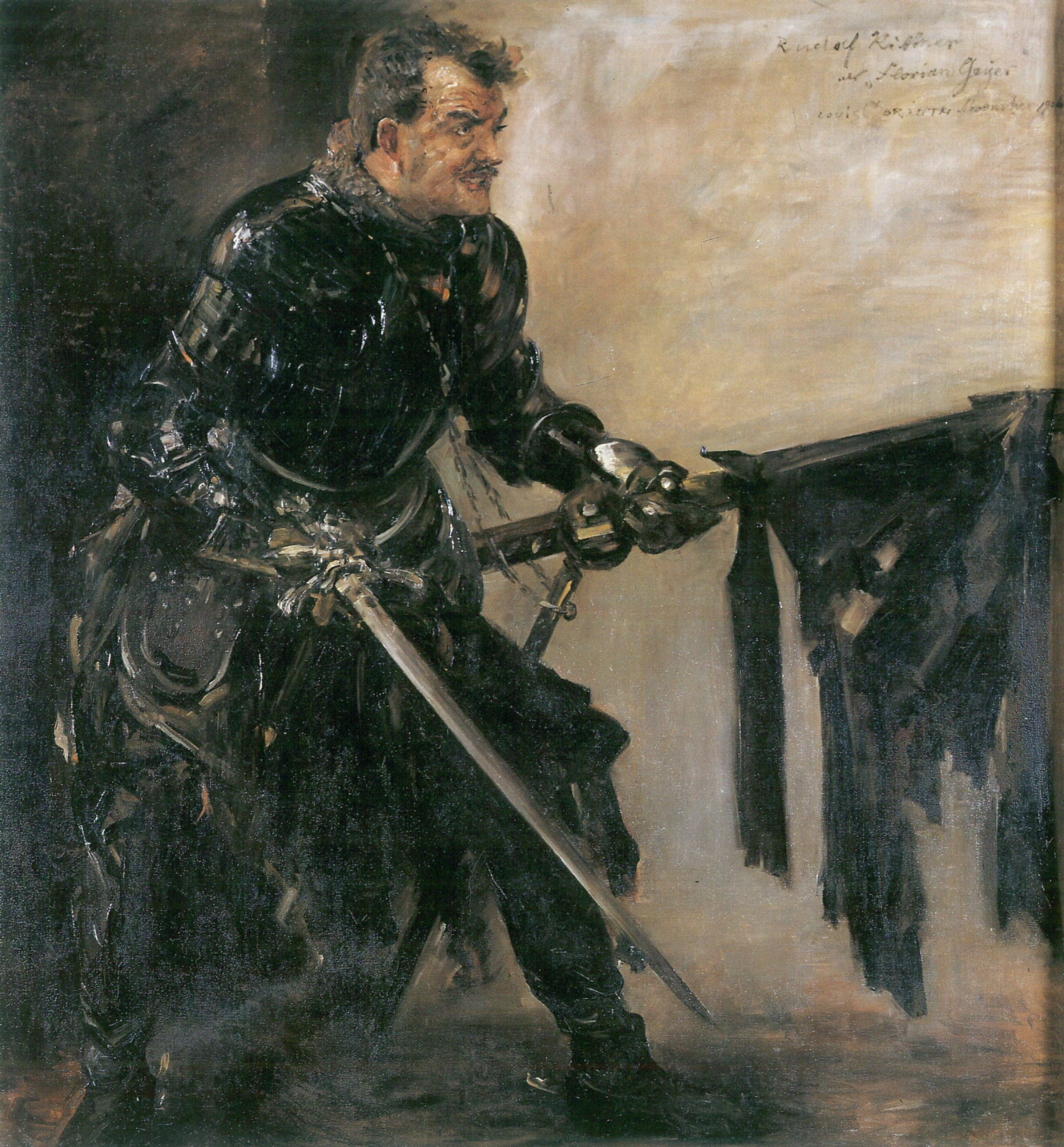
- Rudolf Rittner as Florian Geyer, 1906 painting by Lovis Corinth
- Born: 30 June 1869; Weissbach, Silesia, Prussia
- Died: 4 February 1943 (aged 73); Weissbach, Silesia, Nazi Germany
- Occupations: Actor, playwright
- Years active: 1890s–1924 (theater and film)
- Notable work: Die Nibelungen

Rudolf Rittner (30 June 1869 – 4 February 1943) was a German actor born in Weissbach, Silesia, famous for playing knight and folk hero Florian Geyer in Gerhart Hauptmann's drama of the same name. The well-known German painter Lovis Corinth portrayed him in 1906. Only one year later, at the age of 38, Rittner being at the peak of his career retired as theatrical actor.

In 1922, he returned as actor in several German movies, especially in Fritz Lang's 1924 silent masterpiece Die Nibelungen with Rittner starring as Markgraf Rüdiger von Bechlarn.

When he died in 1943, Rittner left two dramas, one of them being Narrenglanz (A Fool's Glory), an allegory on modern acting. Rudolf Rittner died in Weissbach and is buried on the local cemetery.

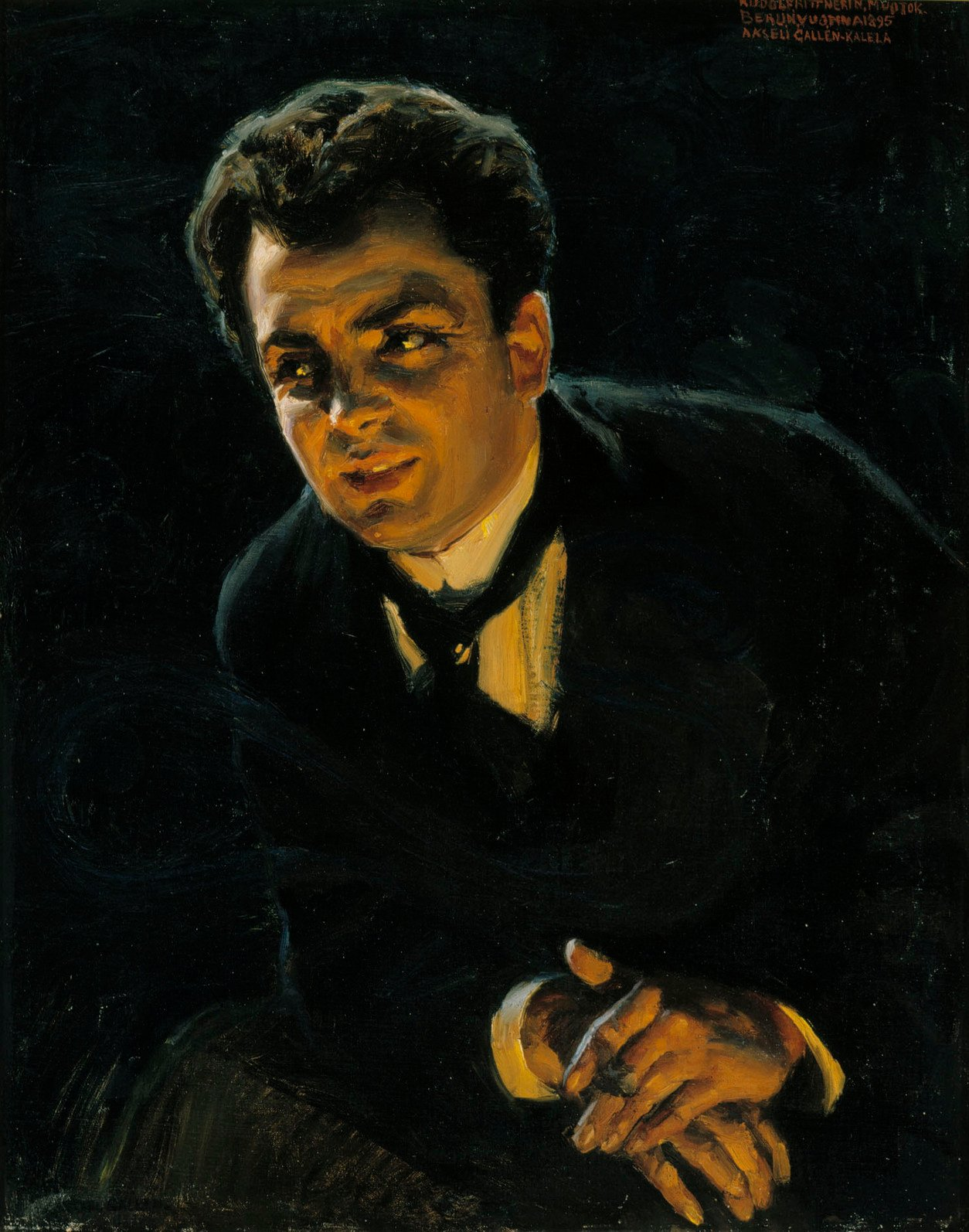
Portrait of Rittner by Akseli Gallen-Kallela, 1895

== Filmography ==
- The Count of Charolais (1922)
- A Glass of Water (1923)
- Die Nibelungen (1924)
- Chronicles of the Gray House (1925)
- The Poacher (1925)
- The Man in the Fire (1926)
- The Master of Nuremberg (1927)
- The Merry Vineyard (1927)
- Father and Son (1930)
