= The Merry Vineyard (1927 film) =

1927 German silent comedy film

- Directed by: Jacob Fleck; Luise Fleck
- Written by: Carl Zuckmayer (play); Adolf Lantz
- Produced by: Hermann Fellner; Arnold Pressburger; Josef Somlo
- Starring: Rudolf Rittner; Camilla Horn; Lotte Neumann
- Cinematography: Otto Kanturek
- Music by: Willy Schmidt-Gentner
- Production company: F.P.G. Film
- Distributed by: Deutsche Lichtspiel-Syndikat
- Release date: 20 December 1927
- Country: Germany
- Languages: Silent; German intertitles

The Merry Vineyard (German: Der fröhliche Weinberg) is a 1927 German silent comedy film directed by Jacob Fleck and Luise Fleck and starring Rudolf Rittner, Camilla Horn and Lotte Neumann. It was based on a play by Carl Zuckmayer, and was remade in 1952 as a sound film.

The playwright had strong reservations about having his work translated on screen but never opposed any film adaptation.

The film's art direction was by Oscar Friedrich Werndorff.

== Cast ==
- Rudolf Rittner as Jean Baptiste Gunderloch
- Camilla Horn as Klärchen Gunderloch, daughter of above
- Lotte Neumann as Annemarie Most, housekeeper of Jean Baptiste
- Gyula Szőreghy as Eismayr, landlord of Landskrone inn
- Camilla von Hollay as Babettchen Eismayr
- Fritz Odemar as Knuzius, fiancée of Klärchen
- Carl de Vogt as Jochen Most skipper on the Rhine
- Heinrich Gotho as Rindsfuß, wine merchant
- Karl Harbacher as Stenz, wine merchant
- Bodo Serp as Vogelsberger - wine merchant
- Elisabeth Neumann-Viertel as Frl. Stenz
- Friedrich Lobe as Hahnesand, traveller for a wine firm
- Oscar Ebelsbacher as Löbche Bär, traveller for a wine firm
- Paul Morgan as Meyer & Sohn
- Karl Gerhardt as Kurrle, registrar and auctioneer
- Else Reval as Ms. Rindsfuß
- Geza L. Weiss as son of Meyer

== Bibliography ==
- Goble, Alan. The Complete Index to Literary Sources in Film. Walter de Gruyter, 1999.
