= Uhelná =

- Municipality
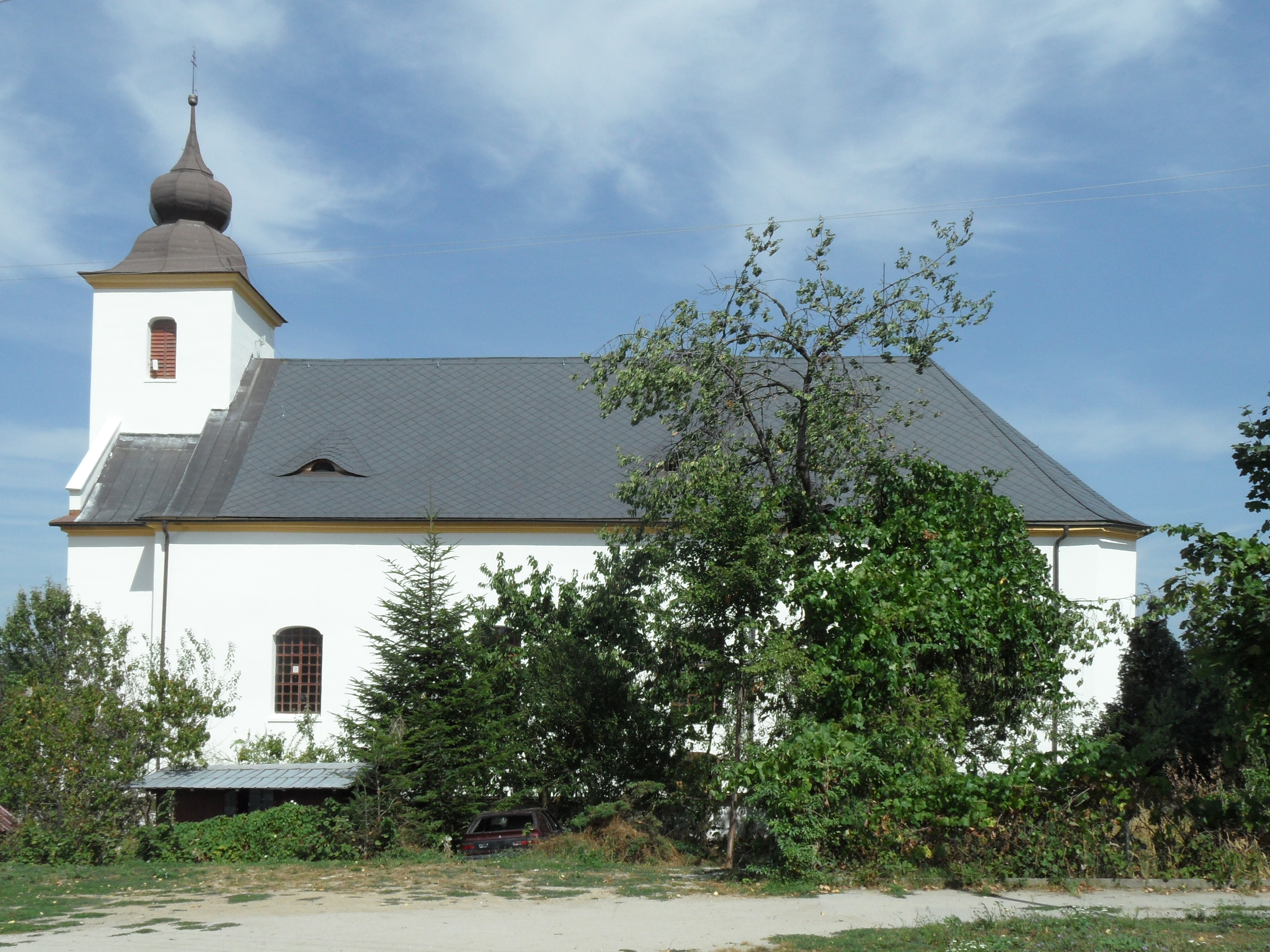
- Church of Saint Catherine

- Flag Coat of arms

- Location in the Czech Republic
- Coordinates: 50°21′54″N 17°1′39″E
- Country: Czech Republic
- Region: Olomouc
- District: Jeseník
- First mentioned: 1290

Area
  - Total: 22.49 km^{2} (8.68 sq mi)
- Elevation: 276 m (906 ft)

Population (2026-01-01)
  - Total: 470
  - Density: 21/km^{2} (54/sq mi)
- Time zone: UTC+1 (CET)
  - Summer (DST): UTC+2 (CEST)
- Postal codes: 790 65, 790 70
- Website: www.uhelna.cz

Uhelná (until 1948 Serksdorf; German: Sörgsdorf) is a municipality and village in Jeseník District in the Olomouc Region of the Czech Republic. It has about 500 inhabitants.

== Administrative division ==
Uhelná consists of six municipal parts (in brackets population according to the 2021 census):

- Uhelná (337)
- Červený Důl (13)
- Dolní Fořt (54)
- Horní Fořt (43)
- Hraničky (6)
- Nové Vilémovice (24)

== Etymology ==
The initial German name of the village was Sörgsdorf (meaning "Sörg's village"). The Czech name Serksdorf was created by transcription of the German name. In 1948, the name Uhelná (adjective form of 'coal') was introduced. It refers to the coal mining that used to be done there.

== Geography ==
Uhelná is located about 20 kilometres (12 mi) northwest of Jeseník and 87 km (54 mi) north of Olomouc. The municipal territory briefly borders Poland in the south. Most of the municipal territory lies in the Golden Mountains, but the northern part with the villages of Uhelná, Dolní Fořt and Horní Fořt lies in the Vidnava Lowland. The highest point, located on the Czech–Polish border, is at 799 m (2,621 ft) above sea level. The stream Lánský potok originates here and flows across the municipality.

== History ==
The first written mention of Uhelná (under its initial name Serksdorf) is from 1290.

== Demographics ==
Historical population

Year	Pop.	±%
1869	2,094	—
1880	2,121	+1.3%
1890	2,023	−4.6%
1900	1,825	−9.8%
1910	1,790	−1.9%

Year	Pop.	±%
1921	1,729	−3.4%
1930	1,792	+3.6%
1950	715	−60.1%
1961	790	+10.5%
1970	643	−18.6%

Year	Pop.	±%
1980	556	−13.5%
1991	531	−4.5%
2001	549	+3.4%
2011	503	−8.4%
2021	477	−5.2%

Source: Censuses

== Transport ==
The I/60 road, which connects Jeseník with the Czech–Polish border, runs through the municipality.

== Sights ==
The main landmark of Uhelná is the Church of Saint Catherine. It was built in 1801–1803 and is a unique example of local folk architecture of this period.

== Notable people ==
- Robert Latzel (1845–1919), Austrian myriapodologist and entomologist
