= Golden Mountains (Sudetes) =

Mountain range in the Czech Republic and Poland

- Polish: Góry Złote; Czech: Rychlebské hory
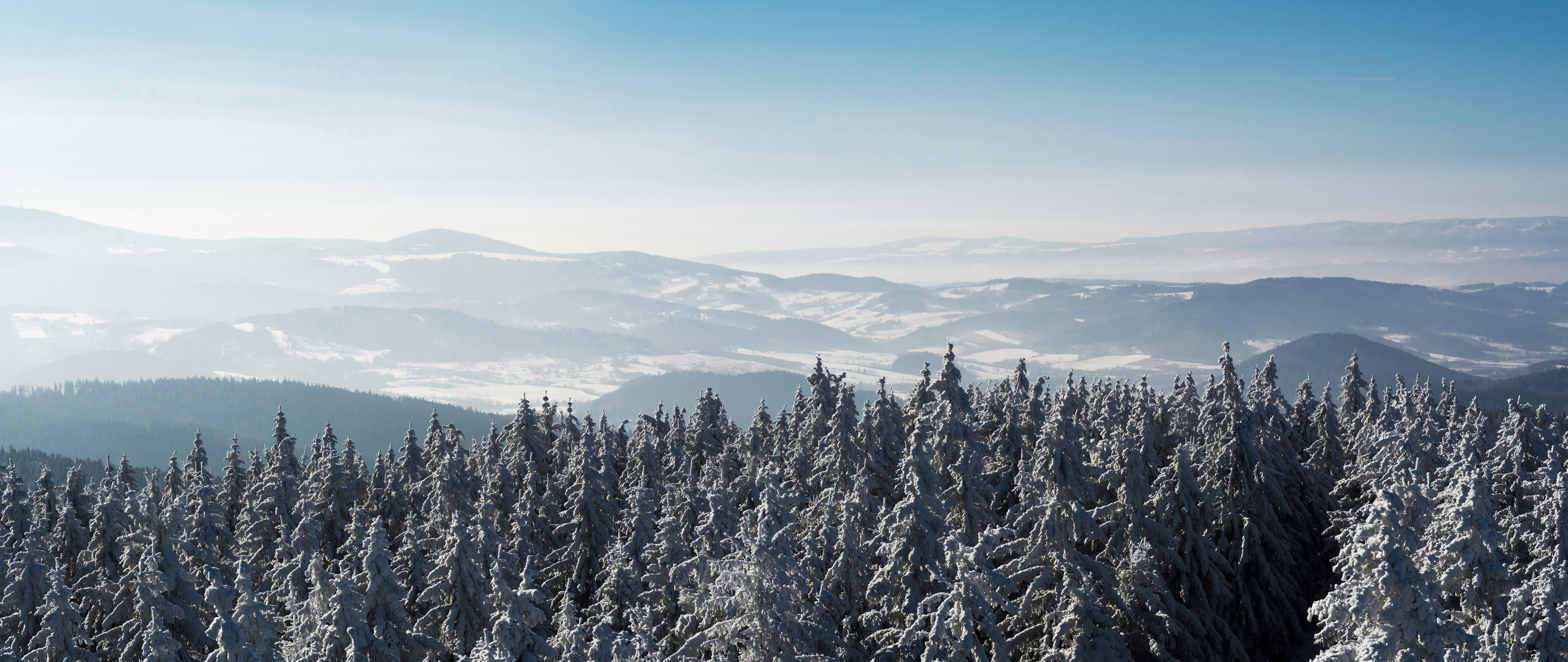
- Golden Mountains seen from 900 metres above sea level

Highest point
- Peak: Smrk
- Elevation: 1,127 m (3,698 ft)

Geography
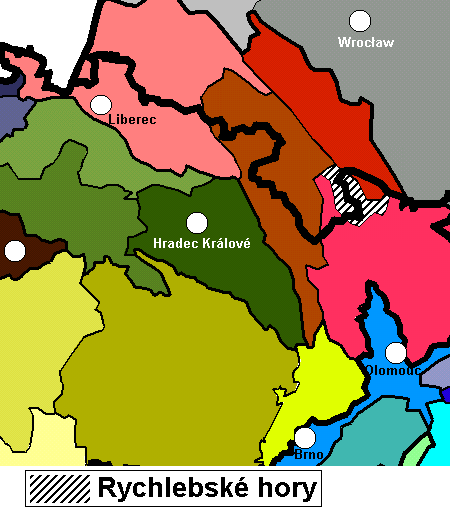
- Countries: Czech Republic and Poland
- Region/ Voivodeship: Olomouc; Lower Silesian
- Range coordinates: 50°15′N 17°00′E
- Parent range: Eastern Sudetes

The Golden Mountains (Czech: Rychlebské hory, Polish: Góry Złote, German: Reichensteiner Gebirge) are a mountain range in the Sudetes province on the border between Poland and the Czech Republic. Various ores were mined here from the 13th to the 20th century, including gold hence the name Golden Mountains. There is a gold mine open to the public in Złoty Stok. It is the wildest, least civilized and least visited mountain range in Poland.

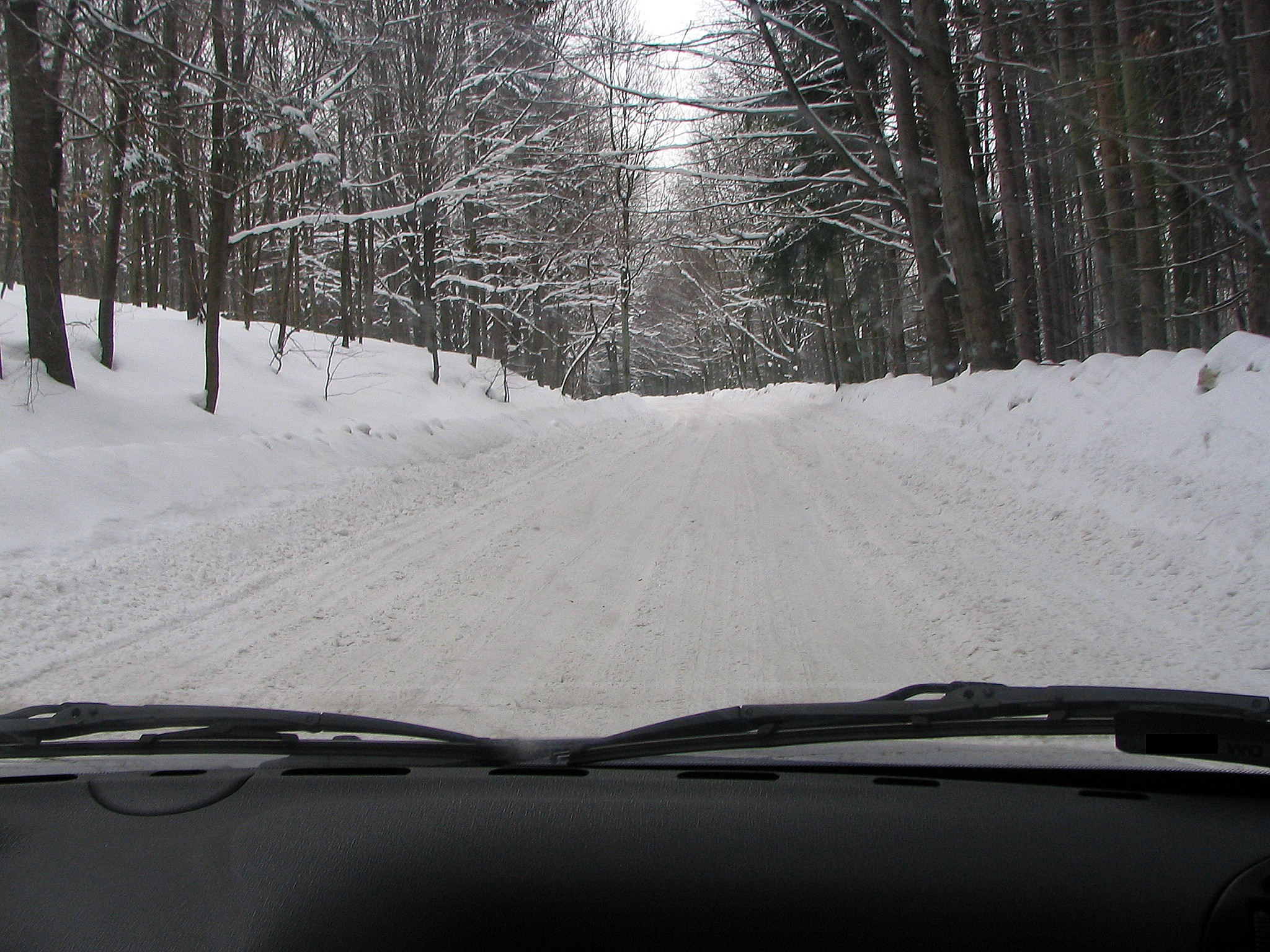
Voivodeship Road nr 390 in winter

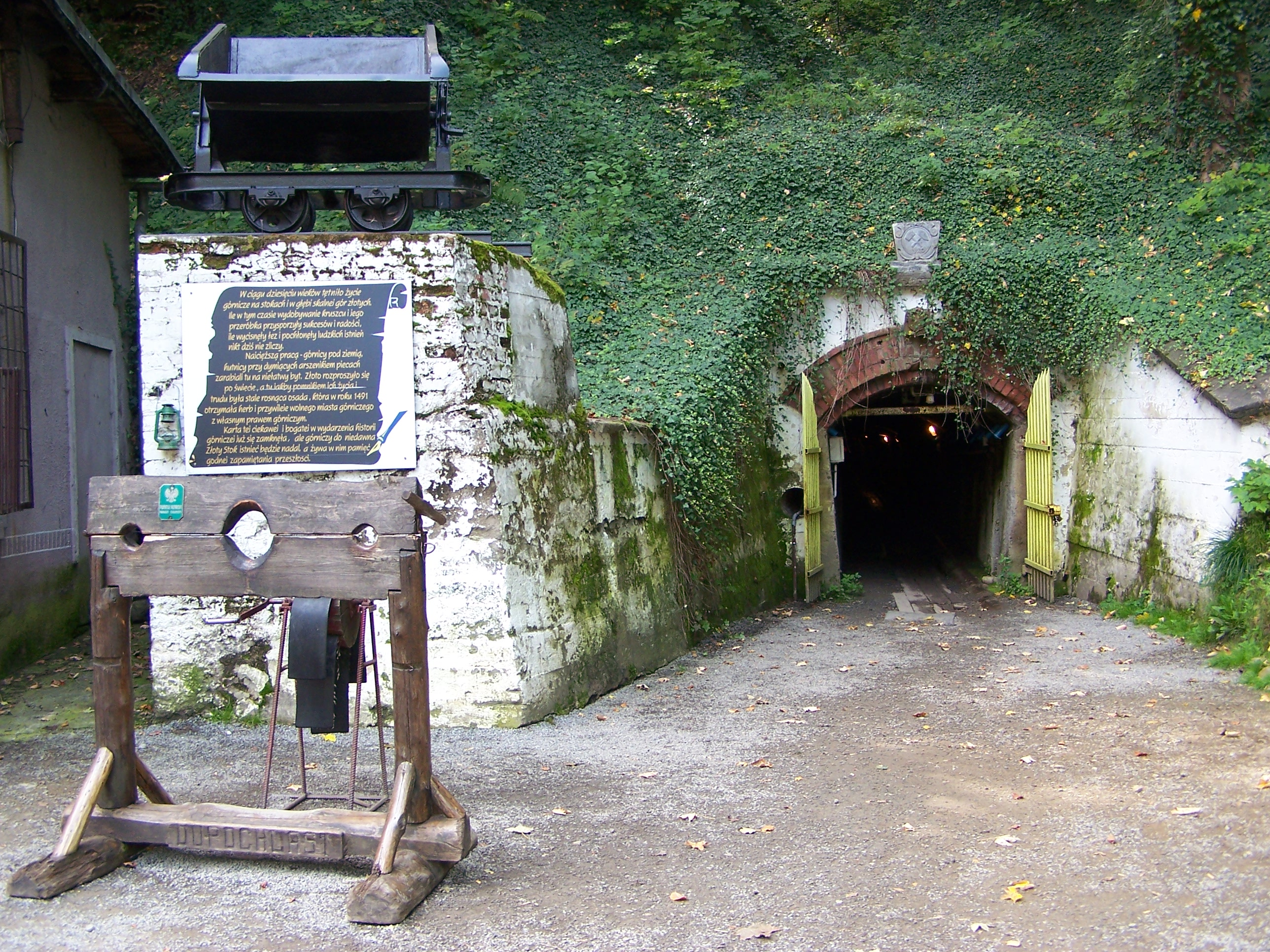
Entrance to the gold mine in Złoty Stok

== See also ==
- Bielice, Lower Silesian Voivodeship
- Crown of Polish Mountains
