= Sudeten Foreland =

Region in Poland and the Czech Republic

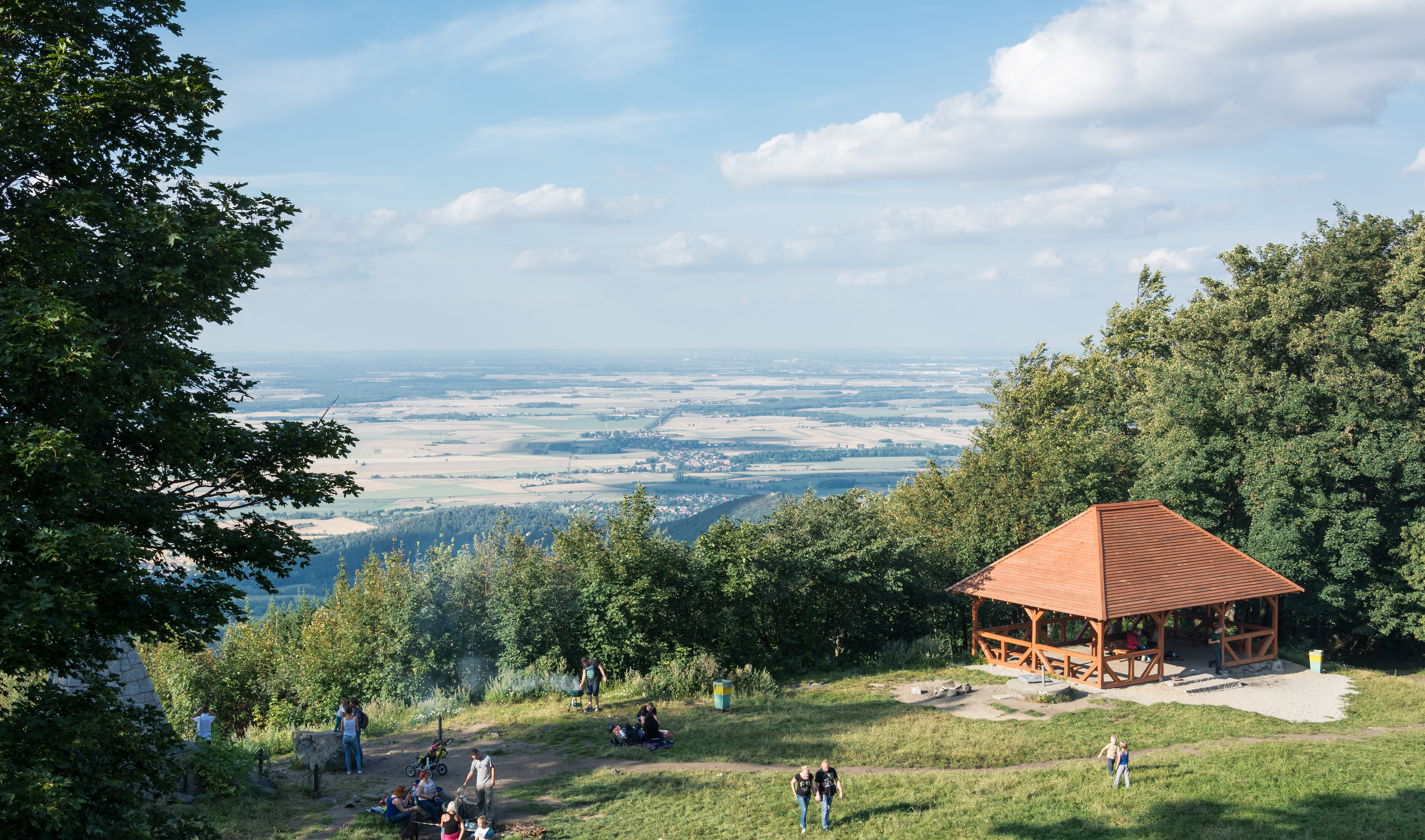
- View from Ślęża

Highest point
- Peak: Ślęża
- Elevation: 718 m (2,356 ft)

Geography
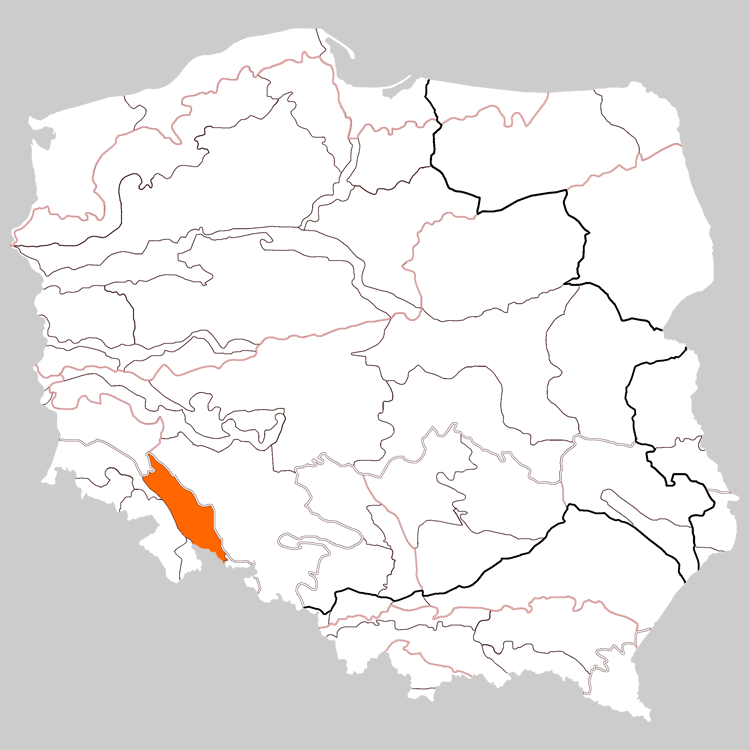
- Sudeten Foreland in the geomorphological system of Poland
- Countries: Poland, Czech Republic
- Range coordinates: 50°27′N 17°10′E
- Parent range: Sudetes

Sudeten Foreland or Sudeten Foothills (Polish: Przedgórze Sudeckie, Czech: Krkonošsko-jesenické podhůří or older Sudetské podhůří, German: Sudetenvorland) is a geomorphological macroregion in the eastern part of the Sudetes proper. The region is located within Poland and a small portion extends into the Czech Republic.

The highest elevation is Ślęża at 718 m above sea level. From the south the Sudeten Foreland borders with the Eastern Sudetes, from the west with the Central Sudetes, from the north with the Silesian-Lusatian Lowlands, and from the east with the Silesian Lowlands.

== Rivers and waters ==
Nysa Kłodzka, Bystrzyca, Oława, Ślęza, Jezioro Otmuchowskie, Lake Mietkowskie and Paczkowski Bay.

== Main cities ==
Świdnica, Dzierżoniów, Bielawa (partly), Świebodzice (partly), Strzegom, Ząbkowice Śląskie, Strzelin (partly), Pieszyce (partly), Ziębice, Paczków, Sobótka (partly), Żarów, Piława Górna, Jaworzyna Śląska, Otmuchów, Niemcza, Javorník (Czech Republic), Złoty Stok (partly), Bardo, and Žulová (Czech Republic).

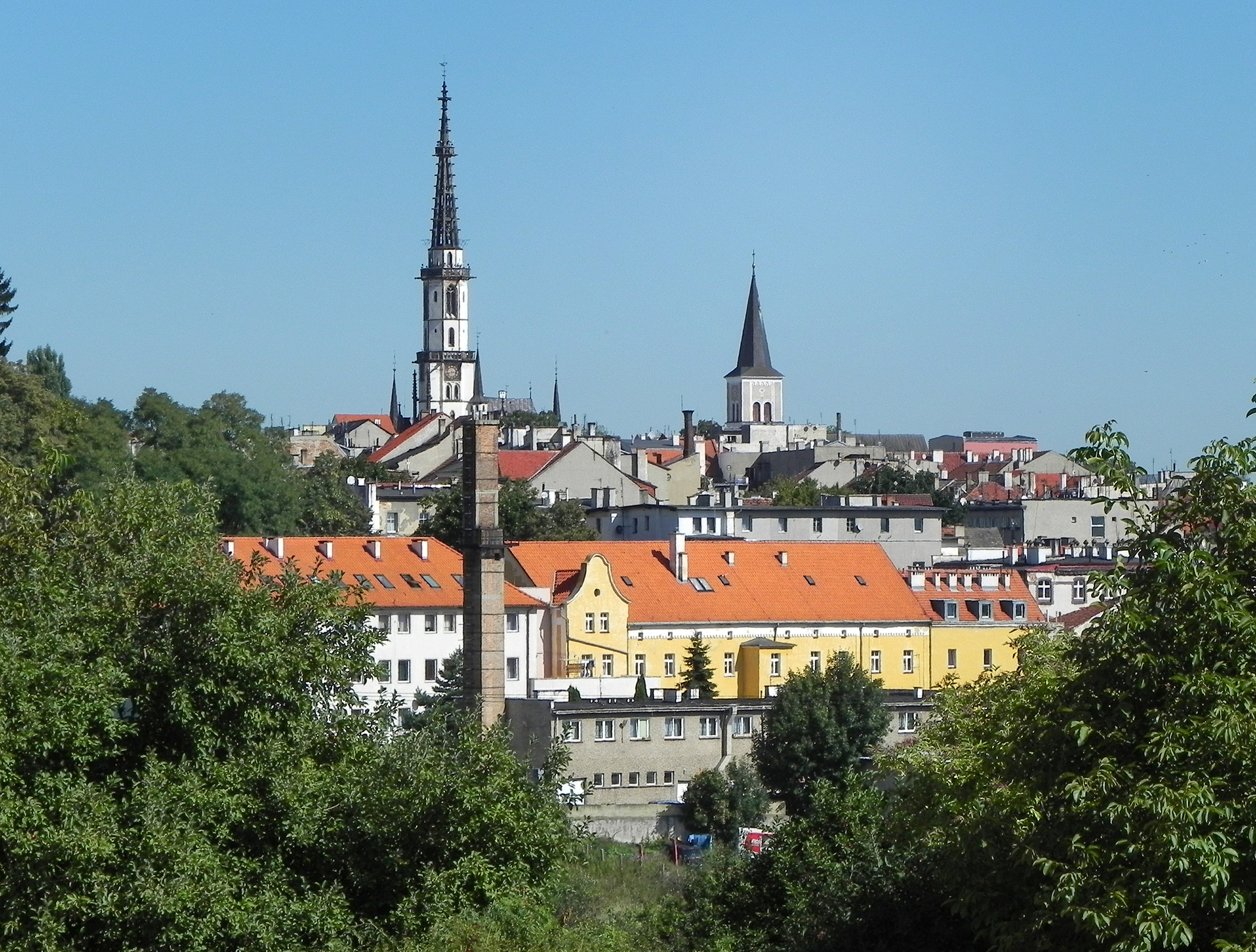
Ząbkowice Śląskie

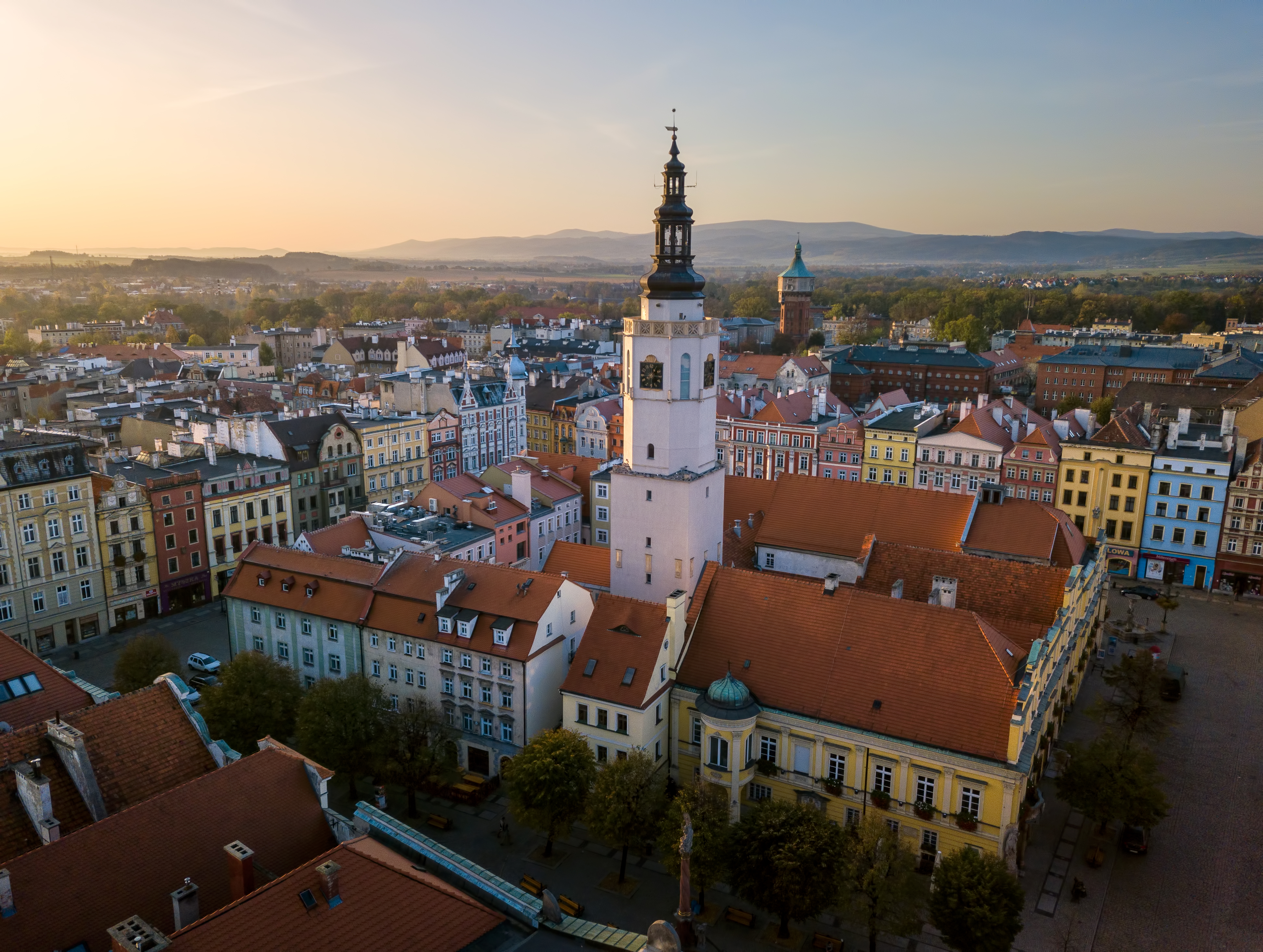
Świdnica

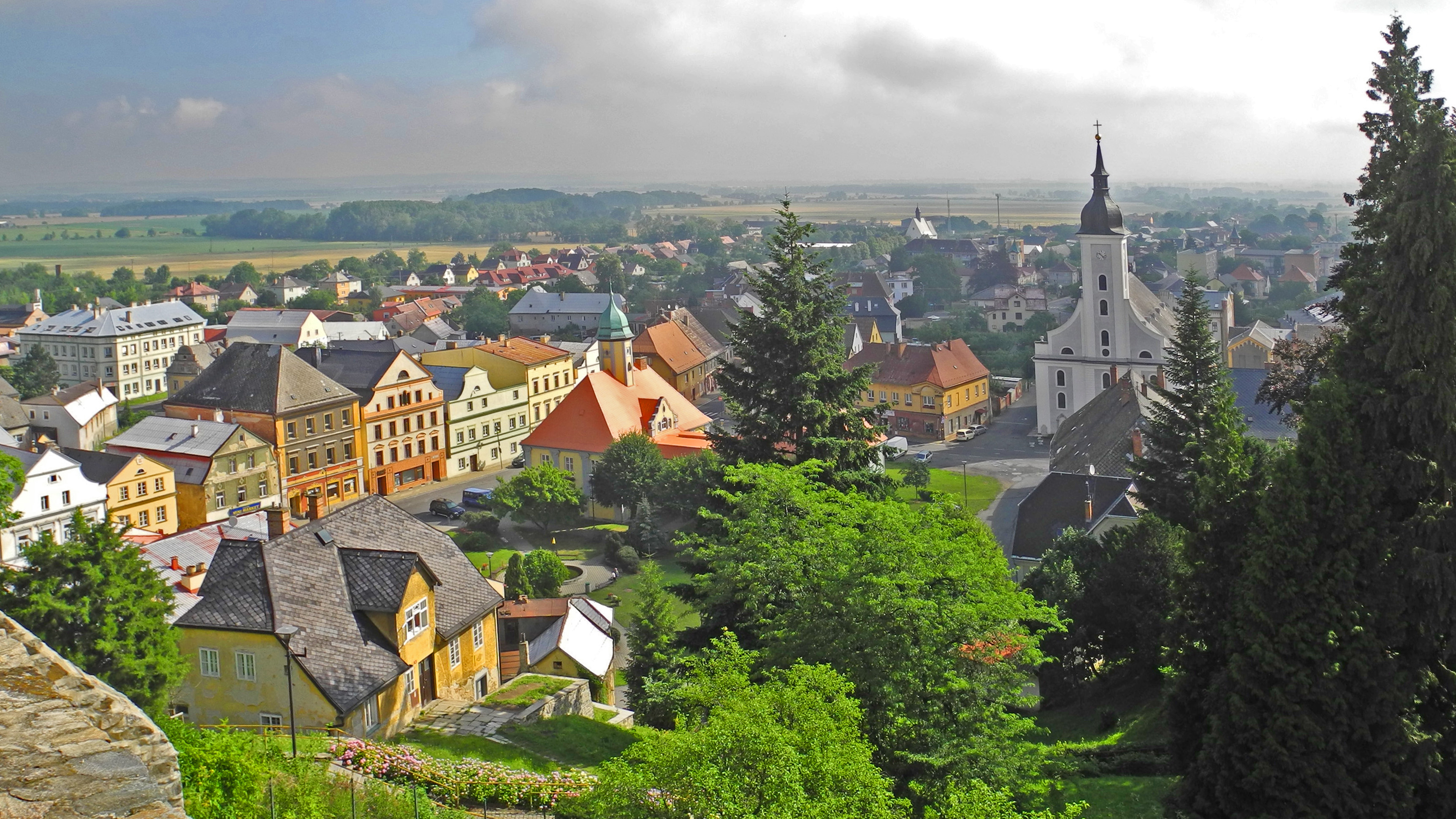
Javorník

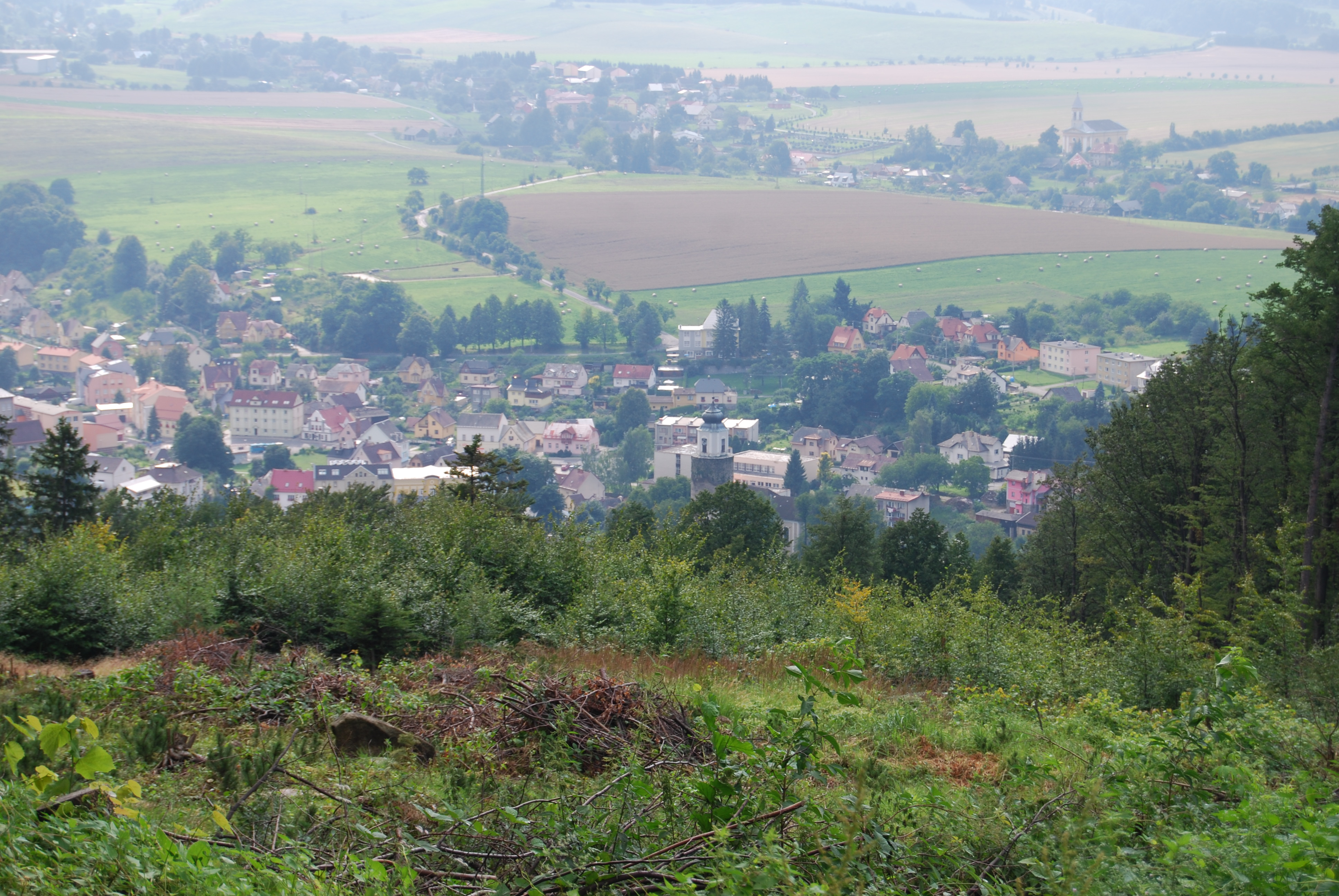
Žulová

== History ==
During World War II, Nazi Germany operated the Gross-Rosen concentration camp with several subcamps in the region.

== Cuisine ==
The officially protected regional traditional foods, as designated by the Ministry of Agriculture and Rural Development of Poland, are the Krupiec linden honey of the Ząbkowice Land (Miód lipowy krupiec z Ziemi Ząbkowickiej) and the Sudetes Foothills jarred kiełbasa (Kiełbasa w słoiku z Przedgórza Sudeckiego).

== Literature ==
- Jerzy Kondracki: Geografia regionalna Polski. Wyd. 3. Warszawa: Wydawnictwa Naukowe PWN, 2014. ISBN 978-83-01-16022-7 OCLC 924755614
- Wojciech Walczak: Dolny Śląsk. Cz. 2, Obszar przedsudecki. Warszawa: Państwowe Wydawnictwo Naukowe, 1970. OCLC 749530821
- Przedgórze Sudeckie. Skala 1:50 000. Wyd. 1. Wrocław: Studio PLAN, 2013.
