= Muna (Mikulovice) =

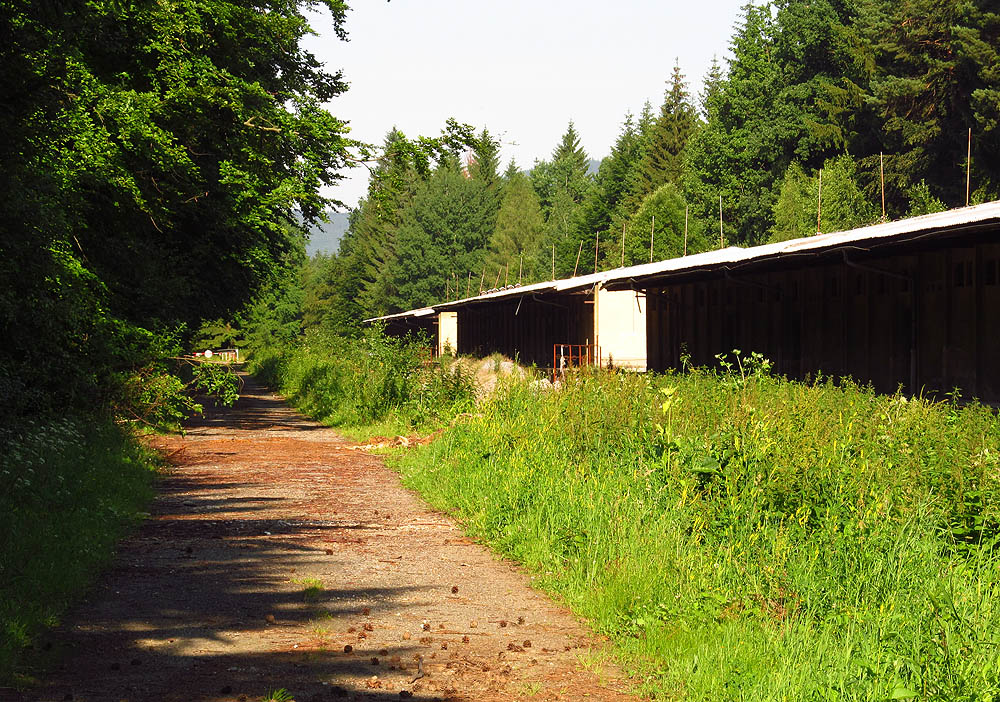
Former railway station at Munam where POWs arrived and from where Sudeten Germans were transferred out of Czechoslovakia

The Muna site is a former POW camp from World War II, ammunition factory and storage plant in the territory of Mikulovice in the Olomouc Region of the Czech Republic, close to the Czech–Polish border. Nowadays, the forested region serves as an industrial park and an area of informal group of non-profit organisation Městečko neziskových organizací. There are 145 buildings of various sizes and age in the area of about 200 ha (490 acres), most of them are heavily damaged or completely ruined.

== History ==
It was decided to build the military ammunition manufacturing plant and depot in the forests between Mikulovice and Salisov hamlet in 1938 after occupation of Czechoslovak border regions by Nazi Germany. Initially, the project Heeres-Munitionsanstalt Niklasdorf development relied on local unfree labourers, later (from 1941) British and Soviet prisoners of war were employed on the site.

There was cca 3 km long spur from railway station in Ondřejovice forking the Mikulovice – Zlaté Hory railway. It ended in a loop of radius 200 m and there was a train station with cargo platform. There were several epidemics in the course of the war, besides other epidemic typhus. The site was used to collect Sudeten Germans before their expulsion to Germany after the end of World War II. Up to 52,000 persons passed through the camp.

The following years brought various tenants into Muna premises: training camp for the Czechoslovak police, an artillery military base that collected and stored trophy (German) and Soviet artillery material and also special school for training Greek guerrilla fighters.

Between 1960s and 1990s, the Muna was managed by the army unit number 8189 and further buildings were built (mainly houses along the access road from Mikulovice). During this years, it served as storage of ammunition for hand guns, artillery and missiles (including anti-aircraft missiles). Nuclear weapon carriers were disposed here complying to SALT II treaty in the 1980s. The number of buildings peaked in mid 1990s (145 buildings). The area was double fenced with a high-voltage barrier which was never commissioned but its remainders are still to be found nowadays.

The army left the area in 2005 and Muna property was transferred to the Mikulovice municipality. The northern part (more densely developed and closer to the town centre) is used as an industrial zone today, the southern part is cultivated by Městečko neziskových organizací. Some of the buildings were sold to private owners and some were destroyed and their material reused.

== Městečko neziskových organizací ==
The Brontosaurus Movement (Jeseníky branch) initiated founding of the informal group Městečko neziskových organizací ("Town of non-profit organisations") in 2011. The members are non-profit organisations that own and maintain some of the local buildings. The number of members is increasing and currently includes:

- Ars Vitae
- Centrum branných aktivit Jeseníky
- Czech Debate Society, z.s.
- Česká tábornická unie – T. O. Kamarádi Šumperk
- Hnutí Brontosaurus – Regionální centrum Jeseníky
- Hnutí Brontosaurus – Základní článek Muna
- Junák - český skaut – Havířov base
- Lacrosse klub Kroměříž
- Royal Rangers in the Czech Republic
- Sdružení přátel Jaroslava Foglara
- Sedm paprsků
- Svět nemocných dětí
- TJ Jiskra Jeseník

=== Muna festival ===
The movement Hnutí Brontosaurus together with members of the Městečko neziskových organizací organized three years of Muna festival between 2010 and 2012, nicknamed the first forest festival in the Czech Republic. The attendance was around a few hundred people.
