= Písečná (Jeseník District) =

- Municipality
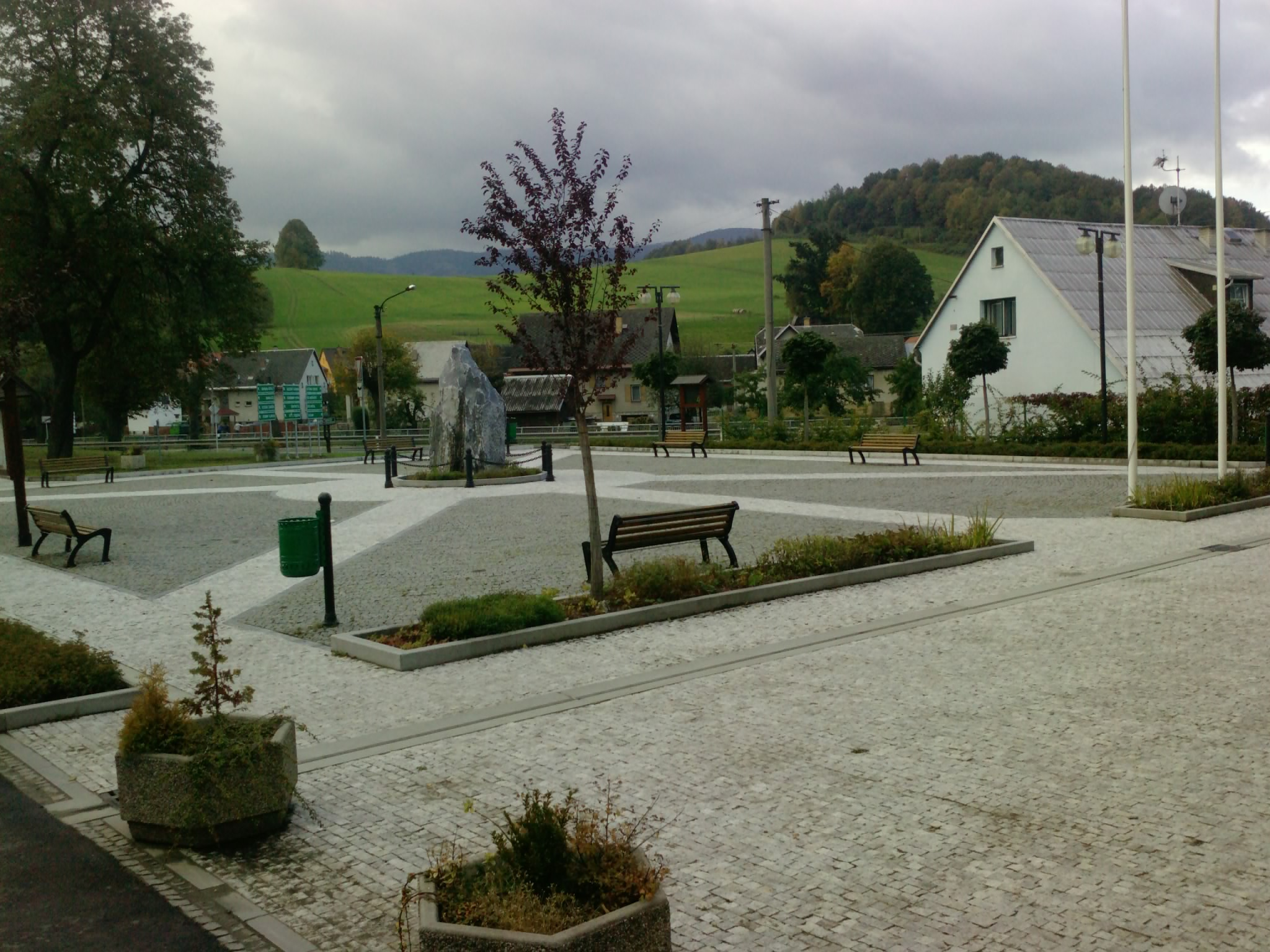
- Square in Písečná

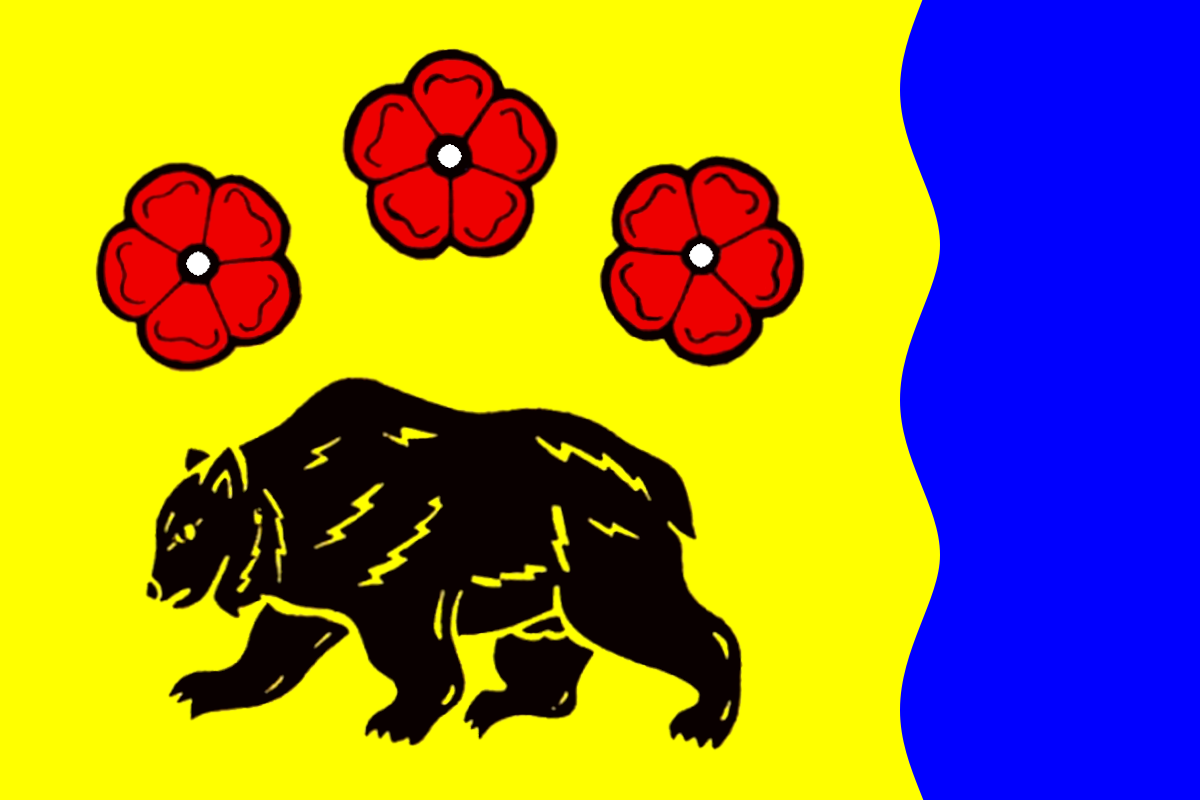
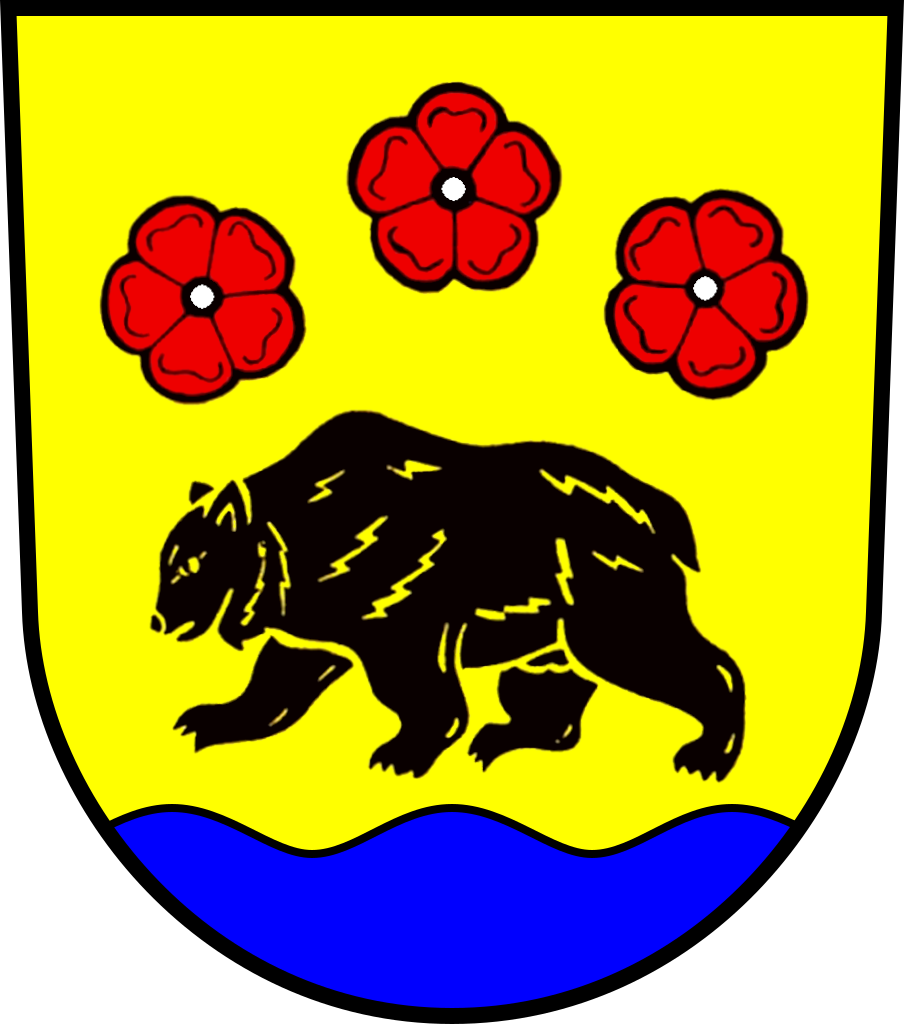
- Flag Coat of arms

- Location in the Czech Republic
- Coordinates: 50°16′23″N 17°15′14″E
- Country: Czech Republic
- Region: Olomouc
- District: Jeseník
- First mentioned: 1373

Area
  - Total: 8.43 km^{2} (3.25 sq mi)
- Elevation: 403 m (1,322 ft)

Population (2026-01-01)
  - Total: 1,025
  - Density: 122/km^{2} (315/sq mi)
- Time zone: UTC+1 (CET)
  - Summer (DST): UTC+2 (CEST)
- Postal code: 790 82
- Website: www.pisecna.cz

Písečná (Czech pronunciation: [ˈpiːsɛtʃnaː]; until 1948 Sandhýbl; German: Sandhübel) is a municipality and village in Jeseník District in the Olomouc Region of the Czech Republic. It has about 1,000 inhabitants.

== Administrative division ==
Písečná consists of three municipal parts (in brackets population according to the 2021 census):

- Písečná (786)
- Chebzí (15)
- Studený Zejf (114)

== Etymology ==
In Czech, the name Písečná literally means 'sandy'.

== Geography ==
Písečná is located 6 kilometres (4 mi) northeast of Jeseník and 74 km (46 mi) north of Olomouc. It lies mostly in the Zlatohorská Highlands, but a small part of the municipal territory extends into the Golden Mountains. The highest point is at 729 m (2,392 ft) above sea level. The built-up area is situated in the valley of the Bělá River. The municipality is partially located in the Jeseníky Protected Landscape Area.

== History ==
A large village called Waltersdorf was located somewhere in the area of the today's municipality. It was first mentioned in 1284 and extinct before 1420. Today's Písečná is rather associated with another village or part of the village called Wüstekirche, which was first mentioned in 1373 and abandoned after 1443. A hundred years later, the area was resettled again and named Sandhübel.

In the 16th century, the settlement was part of the Duchy of Nysa under Bohemian suzerainty. After the duchy's dissolution in 1850, it was incorporated directly into Bohemia. Following World War I, from 1918, it formed part of Czechoslovakia.

During World War II, the German occupiers operated three forced labour subcamps of the Stalag VIII-B/344 prisoner-of-war camp in the village. The Allied POWs worked at the local brickworks, paper mill and quarry.

In 1948, the municipality was renamed from Sandhýbl to its current name.

== Demographics ==
Historical population

Year	Pop.	±%
1869	1,001	—
1880	1,090	+8.9%
1890	1,218	+11.7%
1900	1,359	+11.6%
1910	1,480	+8.9%

Year	Pop.	±%
1921	1,418	−4.2%
1930	1,639	+15.6%
1950	1,068	−34.8%
1961	1,095	+2.5%
1970	1,006	−8.1%

Year	Pop.	±%
1980	1,079	+7.3%
1991	1,069	−0.9%
2001	1,060	−0.8%
2011	994	−6.2%
2021	915	−7.9%

Source: Censuses

== Transport ==
The I/44 road (the section from Jeseník to the Czech–Polish border in Mikulovice) runs through the municipality.

Písečná is located on the Krnov–Jeseník railway line.

== Sights ==
The main landmark of Písečná is the Church of Saint John the Baptist. A chapel, probably built in the 14th century, was rebuilt into the current Baroque church in 1753.
