= Głuchołazy =

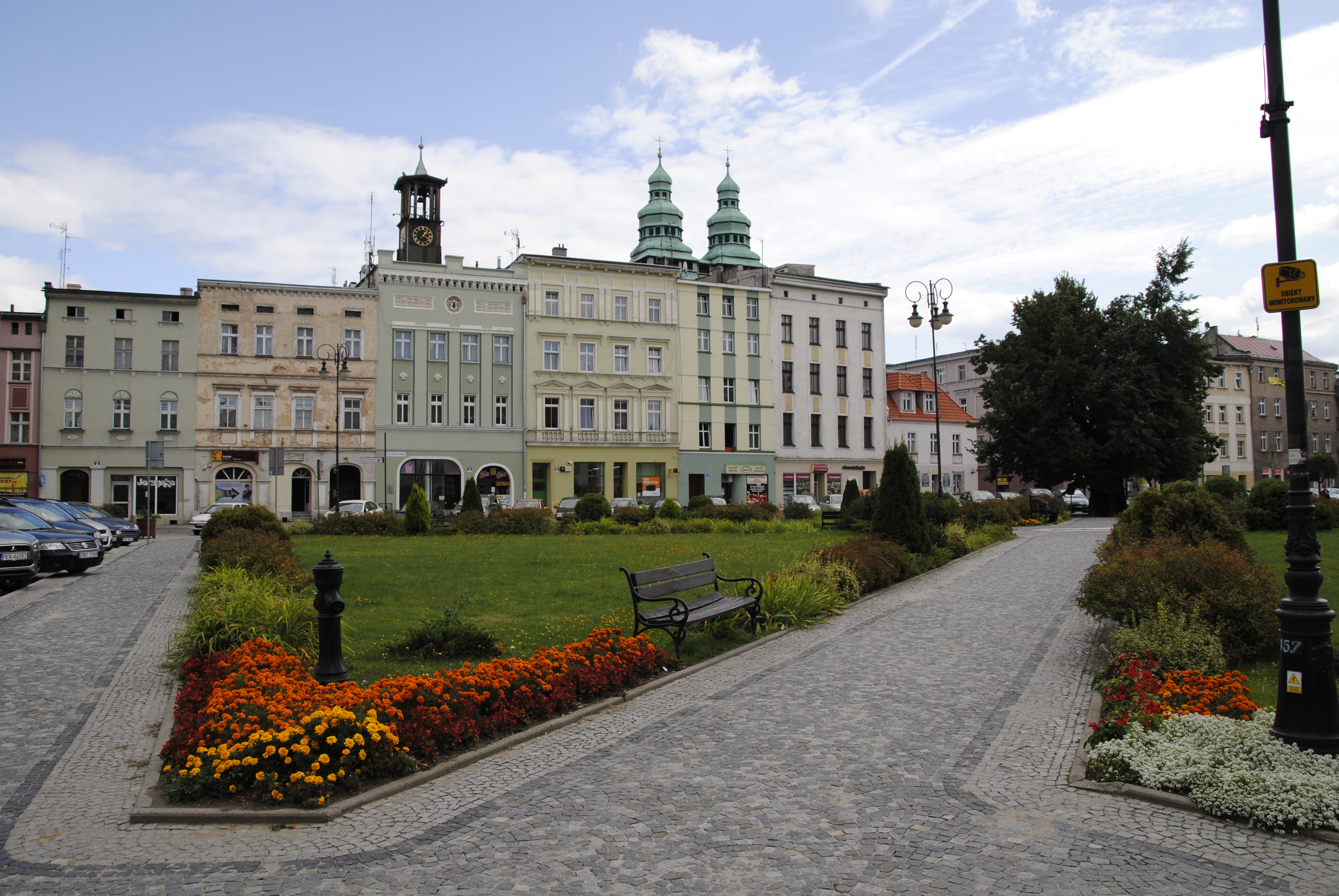
- Market Square and Old Town

- Flag Coat of arms
- Interactive map of Głuchołazy
- Location within Poland
- Coordinates: 50°18′47″N 17°22′27″E
- Country: Poland
- Voivodeship: Opole
- County: Nysa
- Gmina: Głuchołazy
- Town rights: 1222

Government
  - Mayor: Edward Szupryczyński

Area
  - Total: 6.83 km^{2} (2.64 sq mi)

Population (2019-06-30)
  - Total: 13,534
  - Density: 1,980/km^{2} (5,130/sq mi)
- Time zone: UTC+1 (CET)
  - Summer (DST): UTC+2 (CEST)
- Postal code: 48-340
- Area code: +48 77
- Car plates: ONY
- Website: www.glucholazy.pl

Głuchołazy (Polish: [gwuxo'wazɨ] Gu-ho-wah-zi; German: Ziegenhals, also known by other names) is a historic town in southwestern Poland with approximately 13,534 inhabitants as of 2019. It is located within the Nysa County of Opole Voivodeship (province), near the border with the Czech Republic, and is the administrative seat of Gmina Głuchołazy.

== Geography ==
The town is located in the historic Lower Silesia region on the northern slopes of the Opawskie Mountains, in the valley of the Bělá River. As of 2019, it has 13,534 inhabitants.

== Symbol and etymology ==
Głuchołazy has a canting arms – the shield features a goat's head in reference to its former name Koziaszyja (in Polish), Ziegenhals (in German) and Capricolium (in Latin), which literally means "goat's neck". Other archaic Polish name for the town is Cygenhals. The Czech name Hlucholazy and regional Silesian Guchołazy are also used by their native speakers.

== History ==
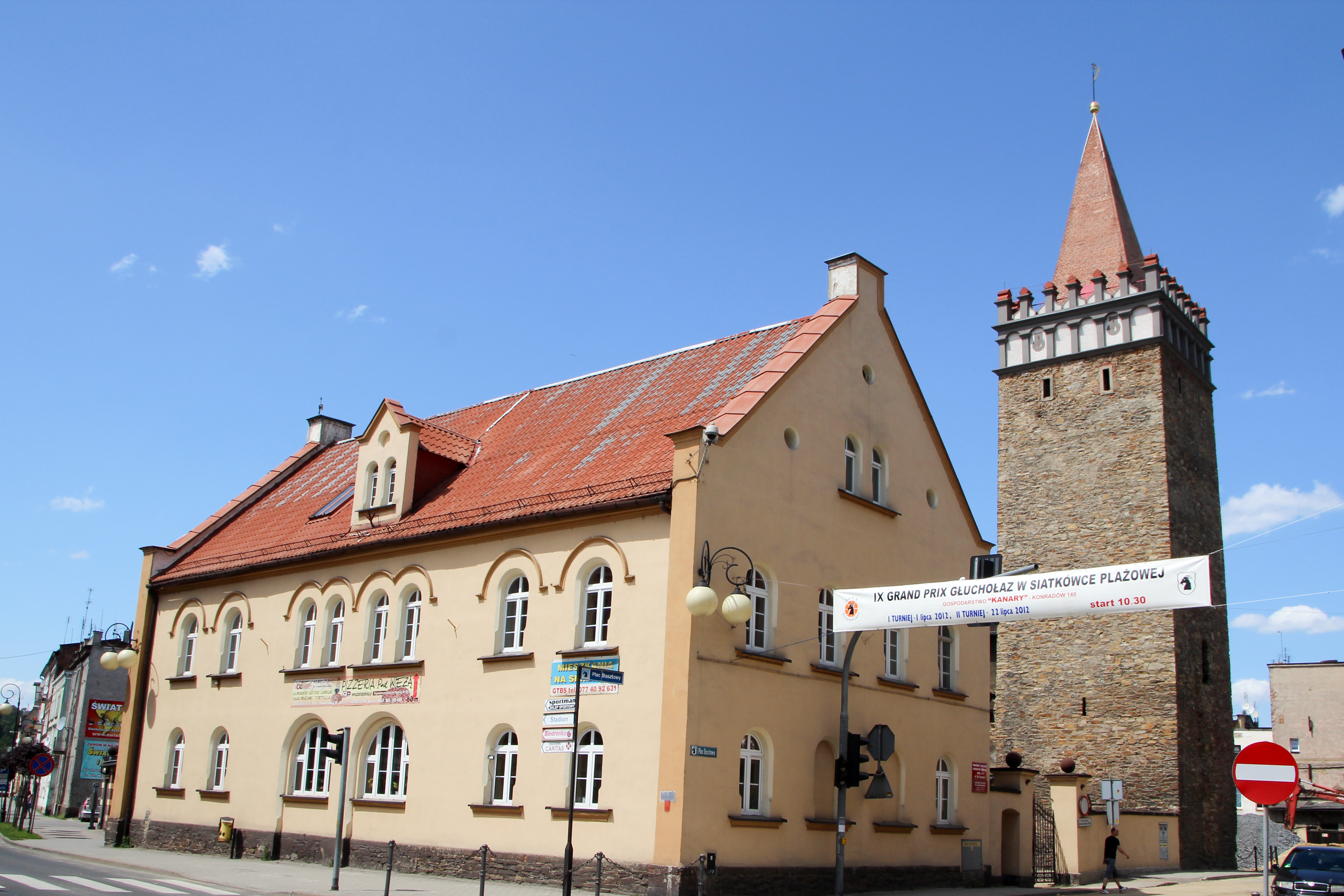
Culture Centre and the medieval Upper Gate Tower in the Old Town

The settlement in the episcopal Duchy of Nysa within fragmented Poland was established about 1220 by Bishop Wawrzyniec of Wrocław, who invited German settlers to build up a stronghold against the threatening forces of the Přemyslid margrave Vladislaus III of Moravia, brother of King Ottokar I of Bohemia. It was granted town rights between 1220 and 1249. In the mid-13th century, the church of St. Lawrence was built, the name of which probably refers to the town's founder, bishop Wawrzyniec (Lawrence). The place soon became an important site of iron ore and gold mining, later run by the Thurzó and Fugger families. By the mid-14th century the defensive walls and tower were erected. The town was devastated in 1428 during the Hussite Wars. In 1445 it passed to Duchy of Głogówek under local Polish Duke Bolko V the Hussite and in 1450 it was again reintegrated with the Duchy of Nysa, and remained part of it in the following centuries.

The town was plundered during the Thirty Years' War (1618–1648). After the First Silesian War and the 1742 Treaty of Breslau the Duchy of Nysa was partitioned and Głuchołazy became a Prussian bordertown, while the adjacent area around Zlaté Hory remained with Austrian Silesia. In 1834 the town suffered a fire, and in the following decades large parts of the medieval walls were demolished. In the 19th century it became a spa town.

During World War II, the Germans established the E355, E371, E476 and possibly also E574 forced labour subcamps of the Stalag VIII-B/344 prisoner-of-war camp in the town. In the final stages of the war, the populace was evacuated in January 1945. In 1945, a German-conducted death march of thousands of prisoners of several subcamps of the Auschwitz concentration camp passed through the town towards the Gross-Rosen concentration camp. Leon Foksiński, who escaped from the death march in Głuchołazy, is an honorary citizen of the town. Retreating Germans blew up bridges behind them, and finally left the town in May 1945. After the war the remaining German population was expelled and with the implementation of the Oder-Neisse line in 1945, the area was transferred to the Republic of Poland, all in accordance to the Potsdam Agreement. The town was repopulated by Poles, many of whom were displaced from former eastern Poland annexed by the Soviet Union, as well as settlers from war-devastated central Poland, especially from the area of Myszków. The first post-war mayor of Głuchołazy was Szymon Koszyk, pre-war Polish activist, writer and publicist in Upper Silesia and participant in the Silesian Uprisings.

The town was severely affected during the 2024 Central European floods.

== Sports ==
The local football club is GKS Głuchołazy. It competes in the lower leagues.

== Notable people ==
- Michał Bajor (born 1957), actor and musician
- Kamil Bortniczuk (born 1983), politician, member of the Polish Sejm, Polish Minister of Sport and Tourism
- Ewa Chrobak (born 1958), activist, author of the logo of the Order of the Smile
- Jakub Ćwiek (born 1982), fantasy writer
- Roman Dąbrowski (born 1972), footballer
- Roland Gumpert (born 1944), engineer and founder of the Gumpert sports car company
- Szymon Koszyk (1891-1972), writer, soldier, national activist, first mayor of Głuchołazy
- Lothar Mosler (1913-1995), historian
- Agnieszka Śnieżek (born 1991), female basketball player
- Andrzej Sośnierz (born 1951), politician and physician
- Carl Stangen (1833-1911), entrepreneur
- Mieczysław Walkiewicz (born 1949), politician, member of the Polish Sejm

== Twin towns – sister cities ==
See twin towns of Gmina Głuchołazy.

== Gallery ==
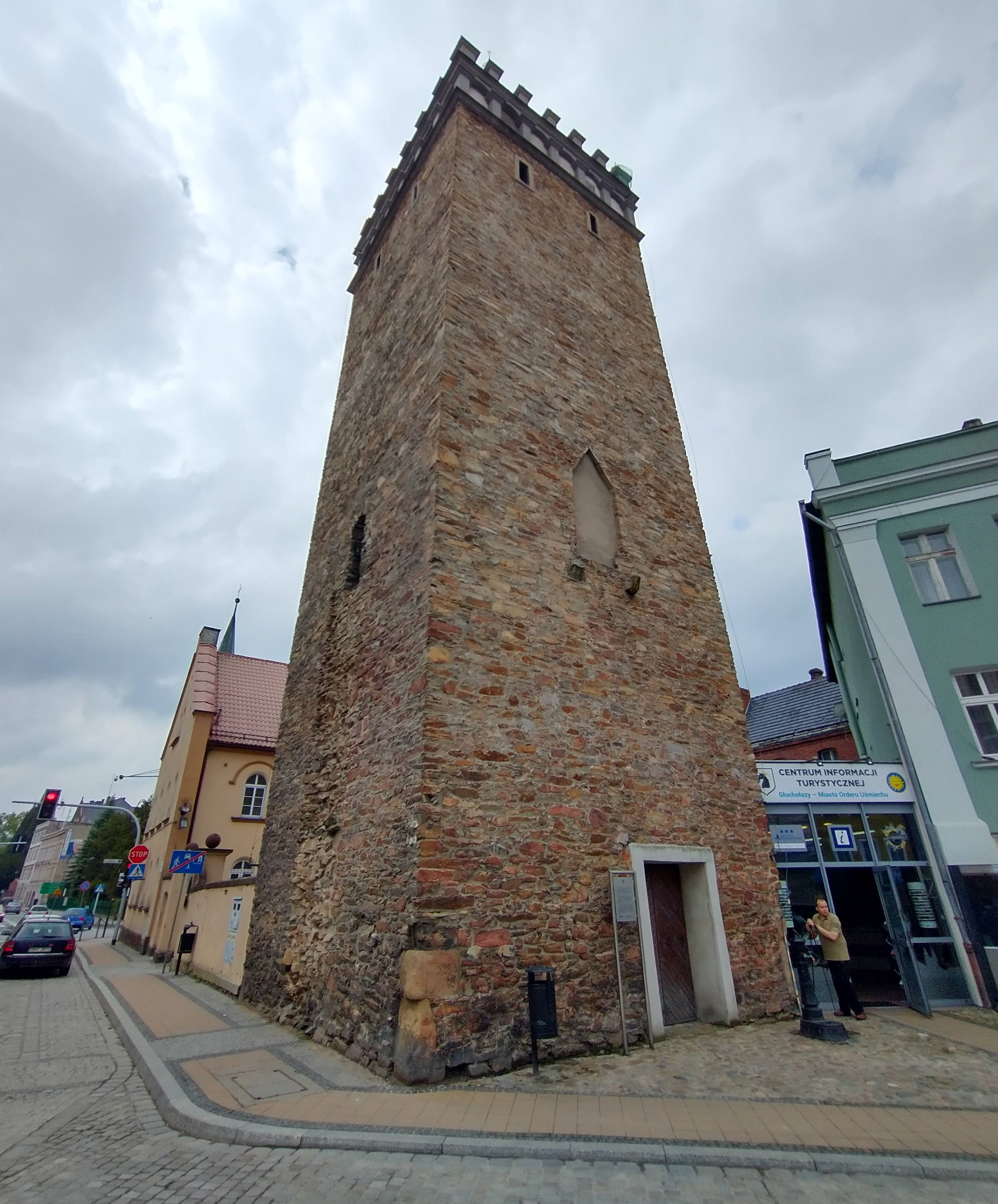
Upper Gate Tower, a remnant of the medieval defensive walls

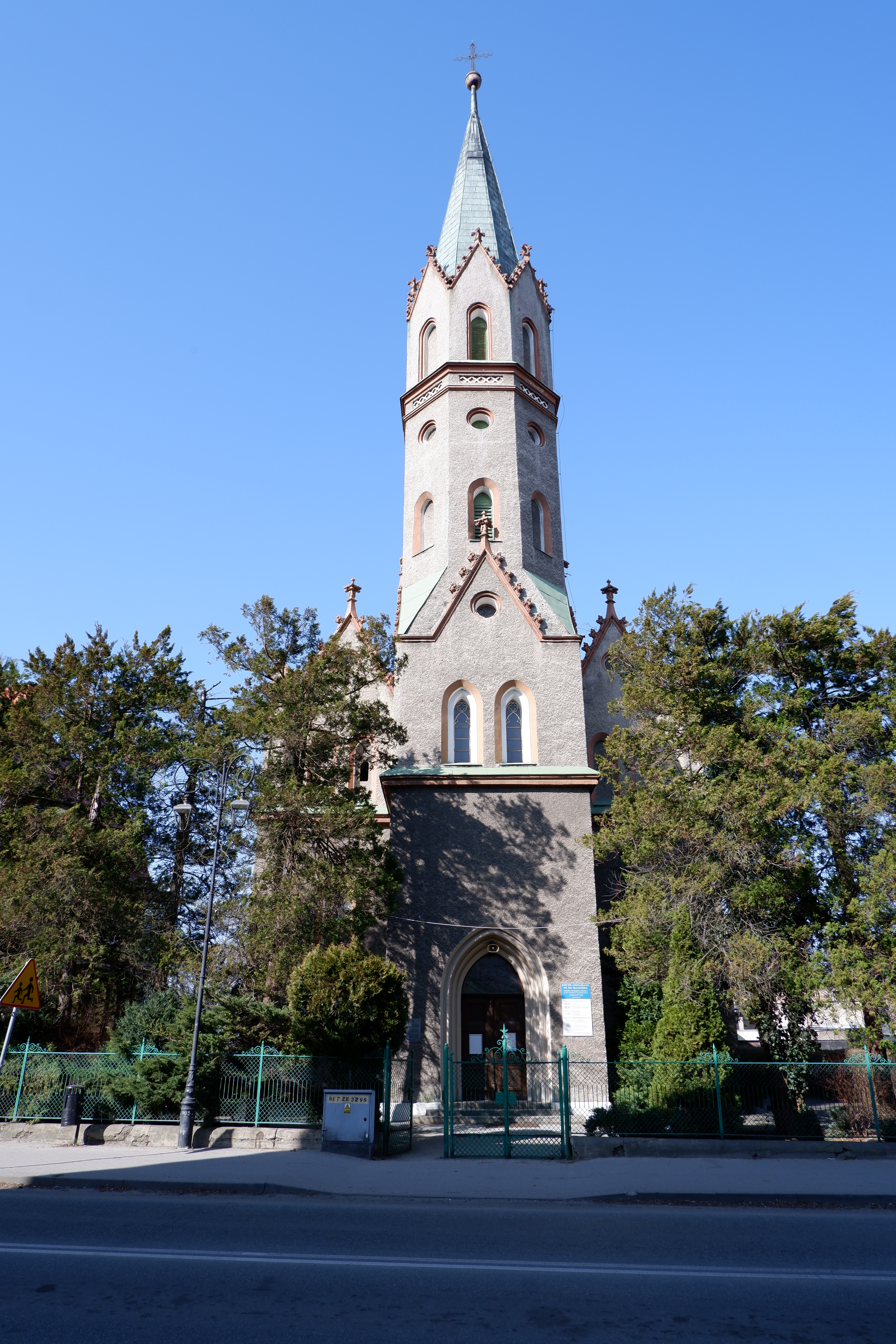
Saint Francis of Assisi Church

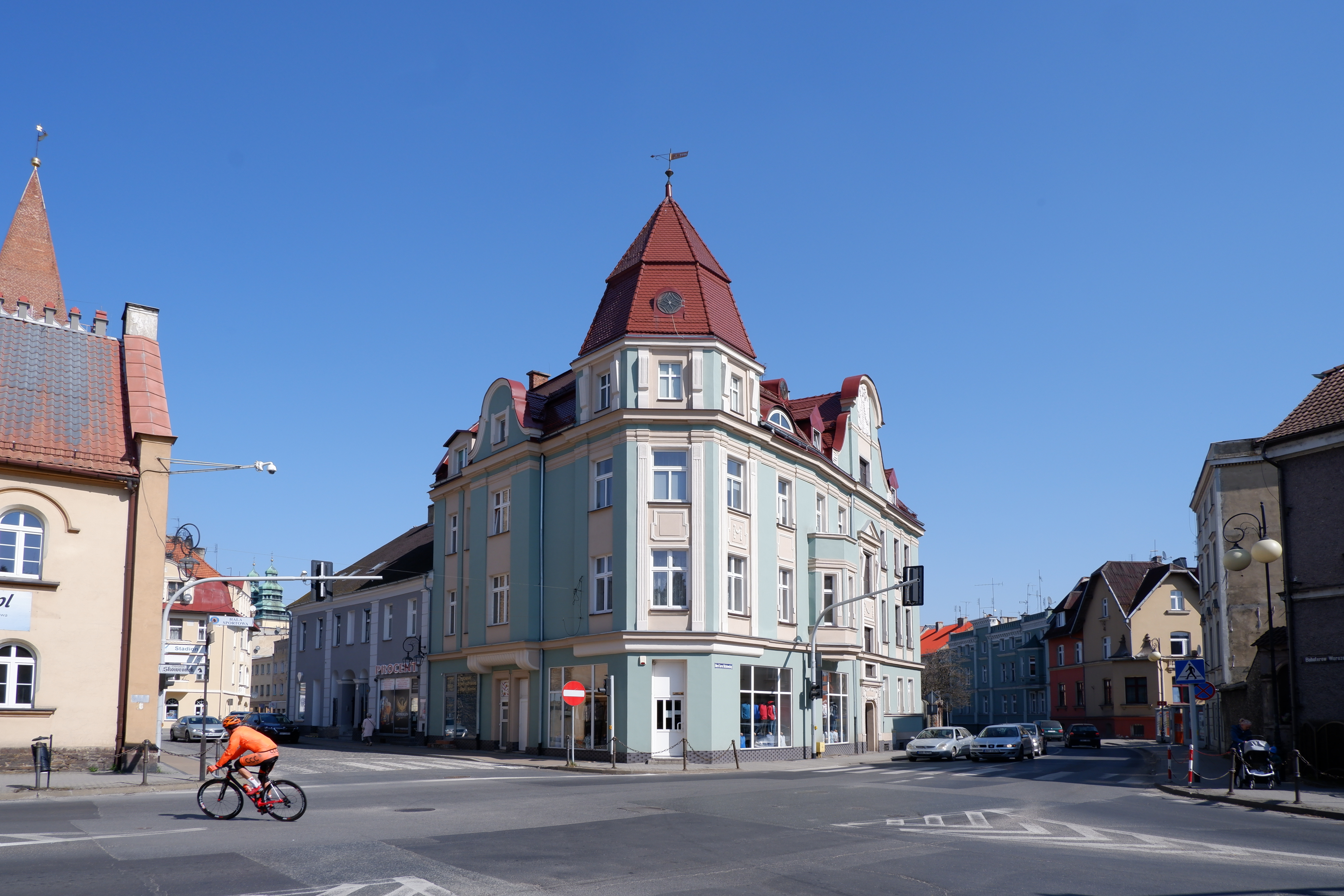
Town centre

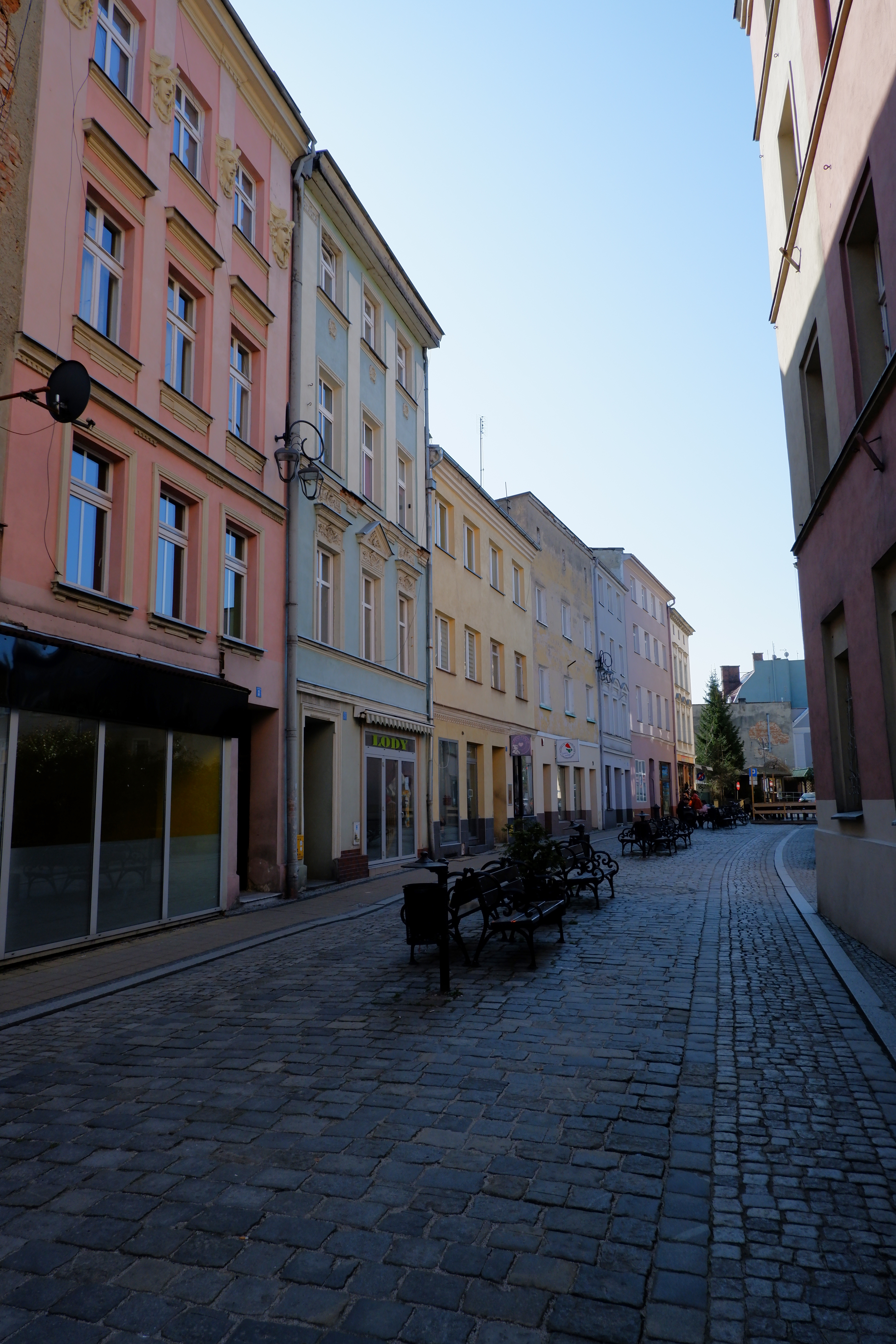
Pedestrian zone in the old town

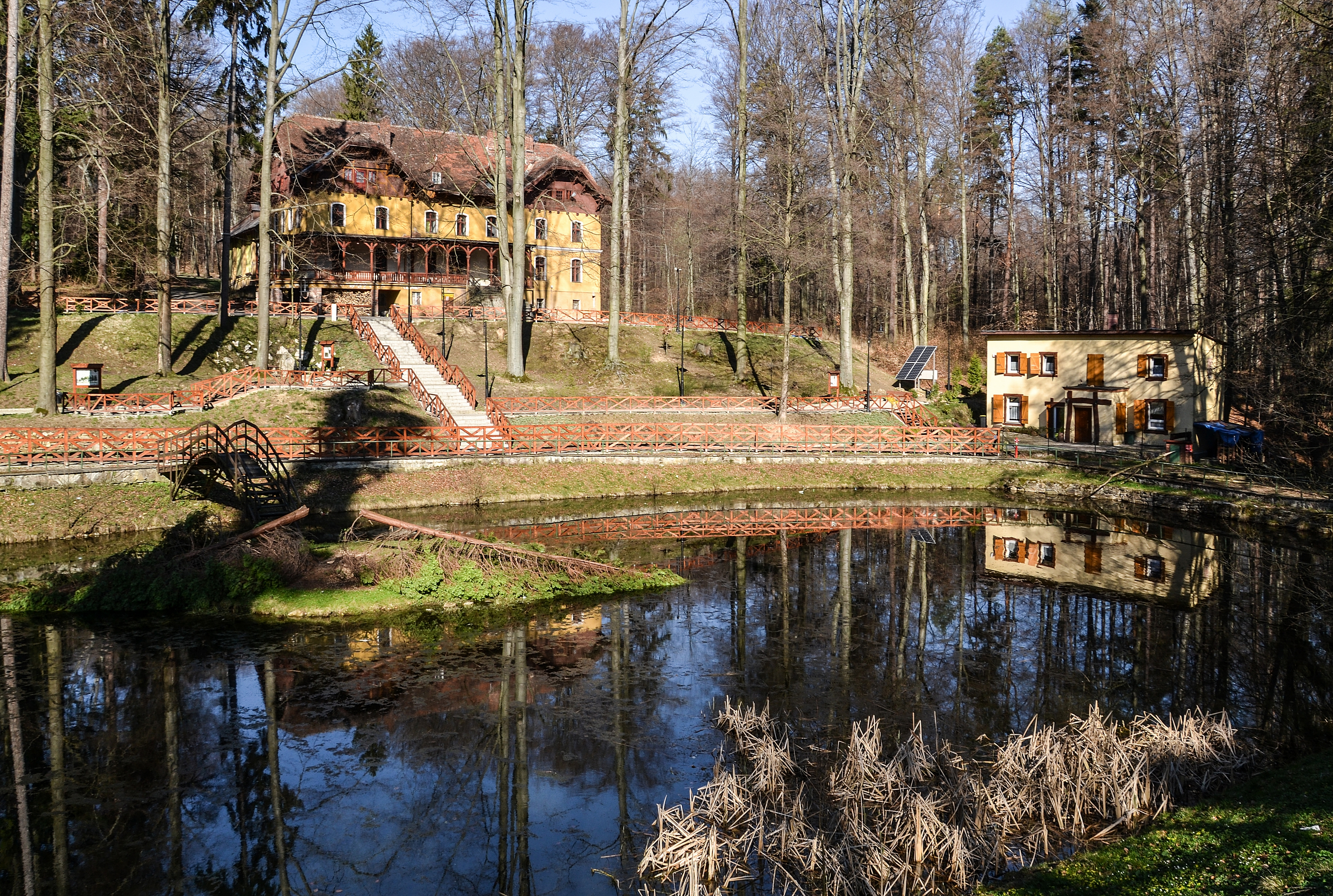
Spa Park in spring

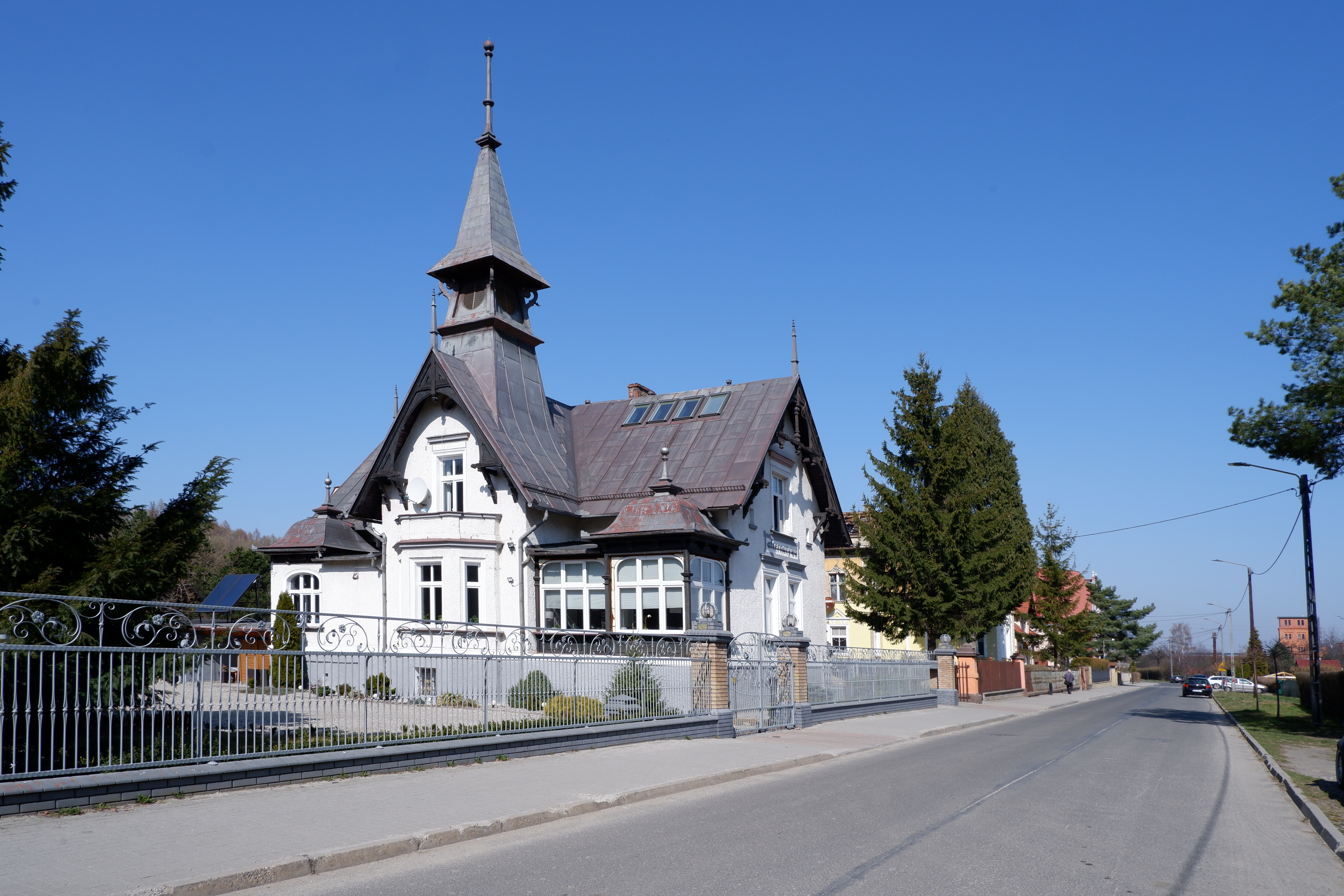
Villas in spa district

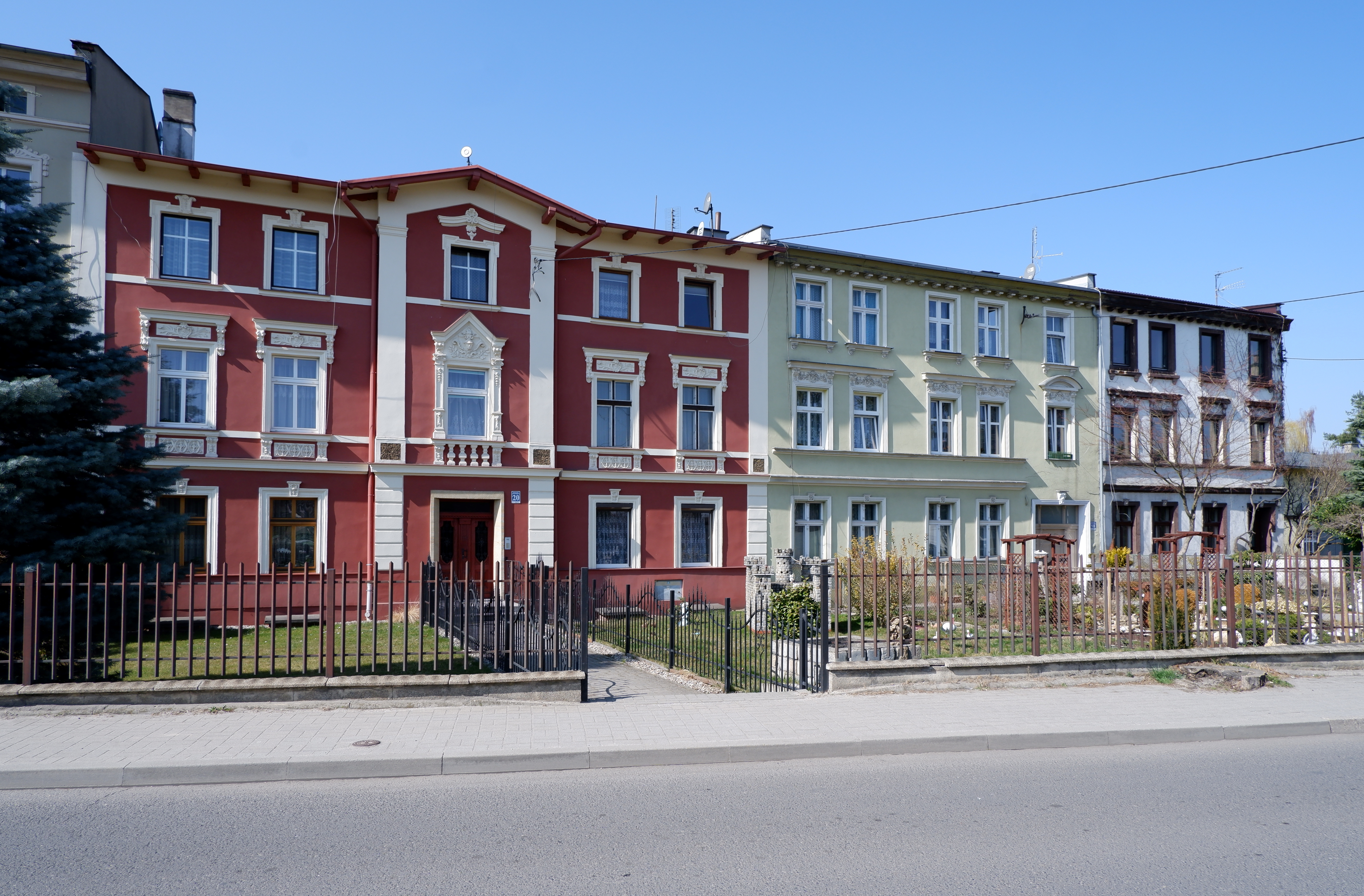
Historic tenements

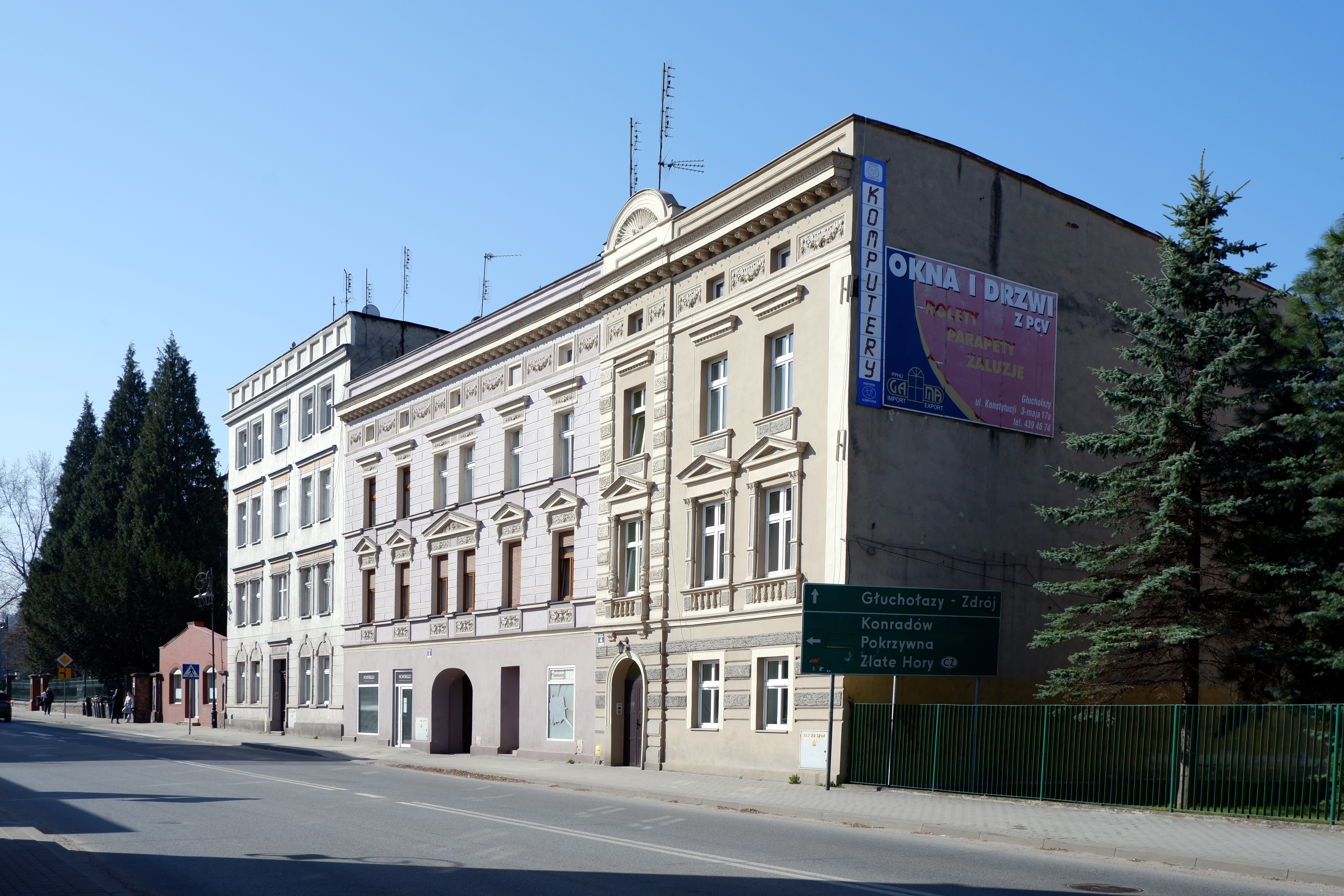
Bohaterów Warszawy Street

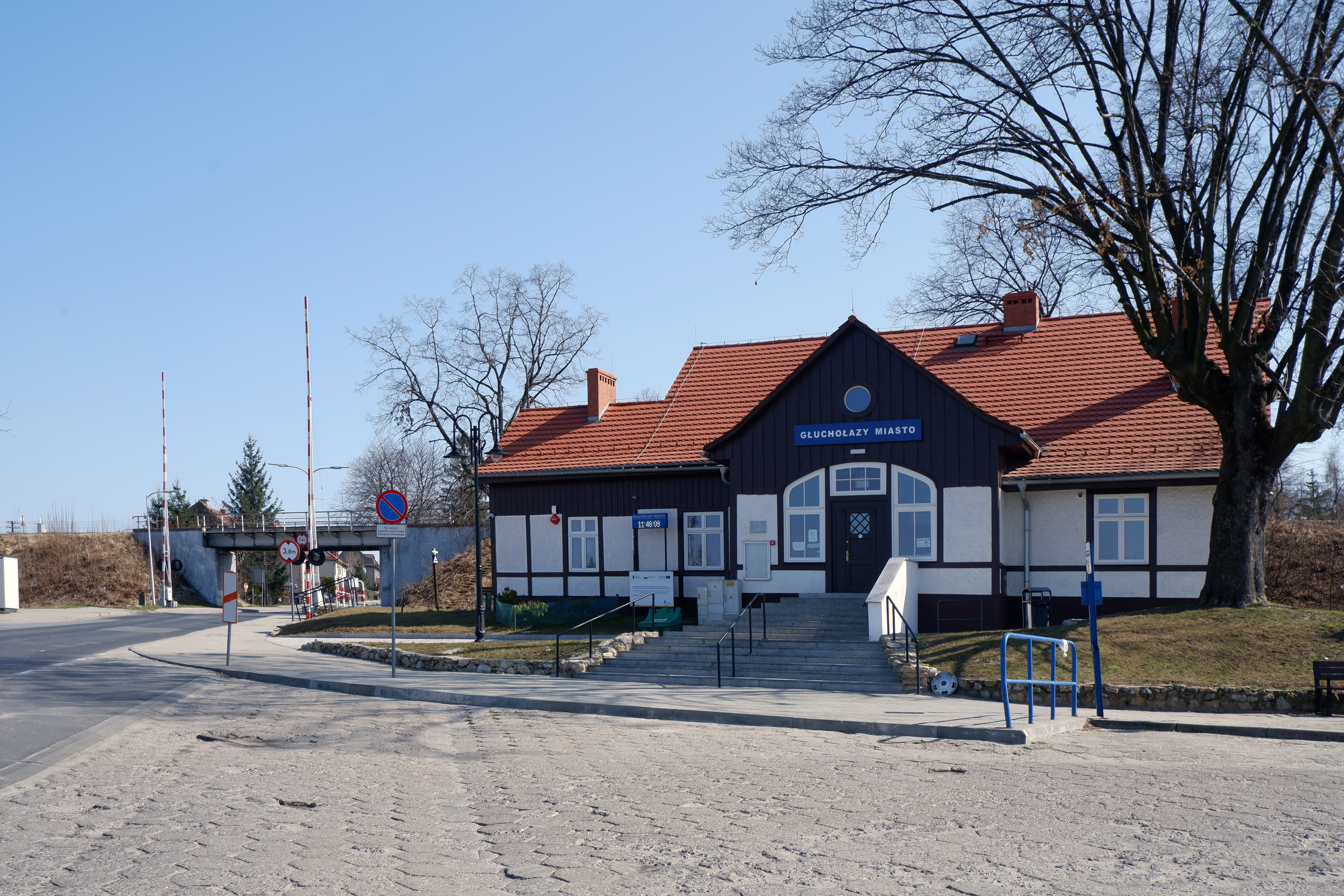
Railway station
