= Otmuchów Lake =

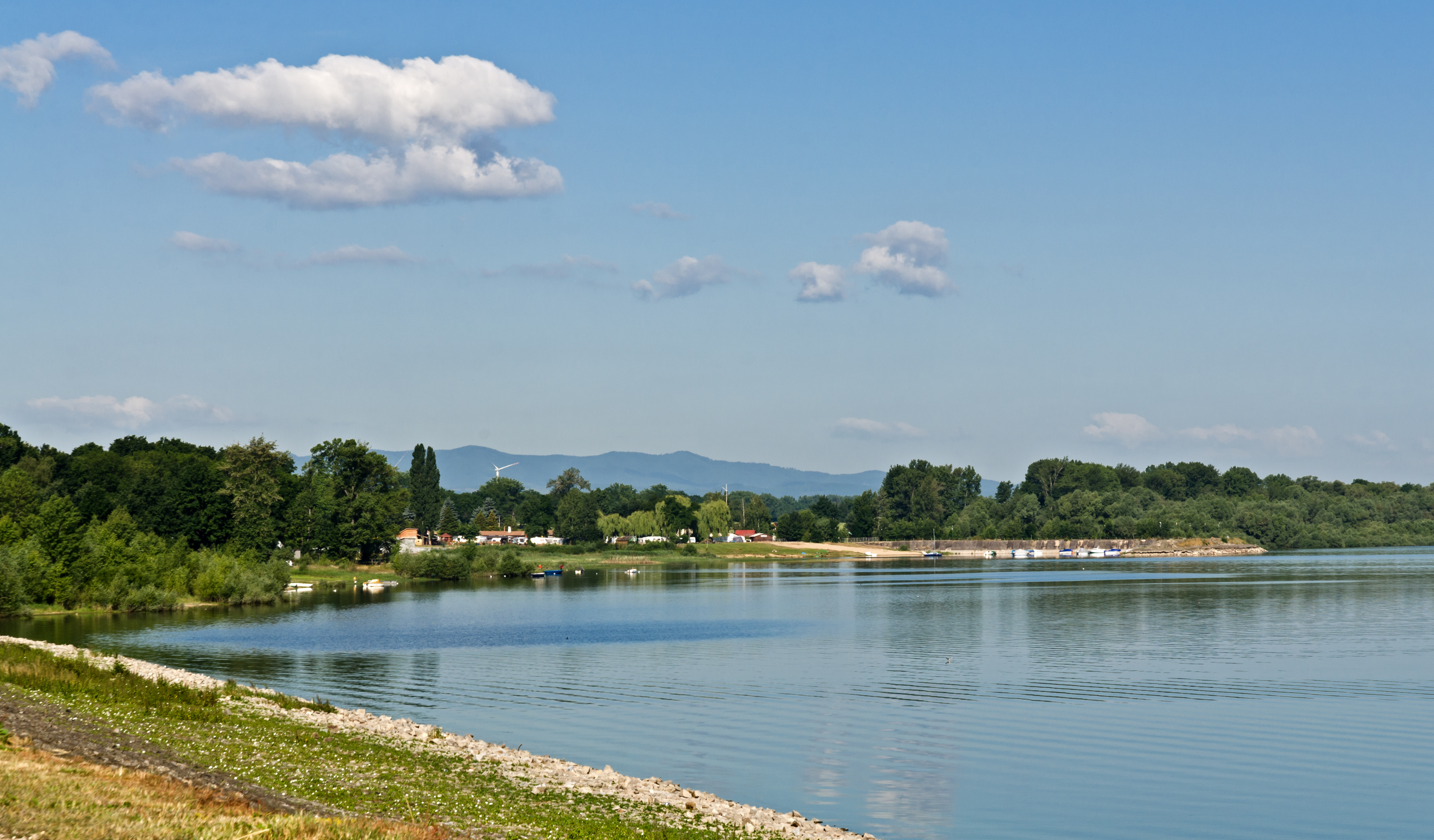
- Otmuchów Lake

- Location within Opole Voivodeship
- Coordinates: 50°27′48″N 17°07′20″E
- Type: reservoir
- Primary inflows: Nysa Kłodzka
- Primary outflows: Nysa Kłodzka
- Basin countries: Poland
- Surface area: 20.6 km^{2} (8.0 sq mi)
- Average depth: 18.4 m (60 ft)
- Water volume: 130.45×10^{6} m^{3} (105,760 acre⋅ft)

Otmuchów Lake is a dam reservoir and retention reservoir built in the years 1928 to 1933, known by the former name Staubecken Ottmachau and situated on the river Nysa Kłodzka, just to the North of the town of Otmuchów. At the maximum level of damming at 18.6 metres the reservoir has an area of 20,6 km^{2} and the capacity 130,45 hm³.

The reservoir closes its drainage basin of the river Nysa Kłodzka at an area of 2352 km^{2}. The capacity was newly estimated in 2001 at 130,45 mln m³, after the river sedimentation in the reservoir had reached 215 metres.

The ceremonial opening of the reservoir with the name Ottmachauer See and commissioning of the hydroelectric power plant occurred on the 17 June 1933. The four turbine hydroelectric power plant, located at the outflow, has two Kaplan turbines with the power of 4.8 MW and supplies energy to the power grid of the country. The flow is at a rate of 2 × 21.5 m³/s at 16 m level difference.

The reservoir belongs to the Kaskady Nysy Kłodzkiej, which is made up of four reservoirs: Topola Reservoir, Kozielno Reservoir making Paczkowski Lake, Otmuchów Lake and Nyskie Lake.

Close by near the lake is located a unique national scale habitat of the grey heron. The reservoir is rich in fish, especially in Zander. To the other side of the town Otmuchów is located the Nyskie Lake.

Around the area of the dam nest Northern wheatears. There are greater scaups, mainly velvet scooters, long-tailed ducks or common scoters and red-throated loons and black-throated loons. In Eastern part of the reservoir in the more densely reeds and willow thickets there are three species of grebes, little bitterns, spotted crakes and Western marsh harriers, and to the end of April there are Savi's warblers species of bird. Various species also rest in the area and are the Eurasian curlews, Northern lapwings, grey plovers and dunlins and curlew sandpipers. There are also ruddy turnstones, Eurasian oystercatchers and red-necked phalarope.

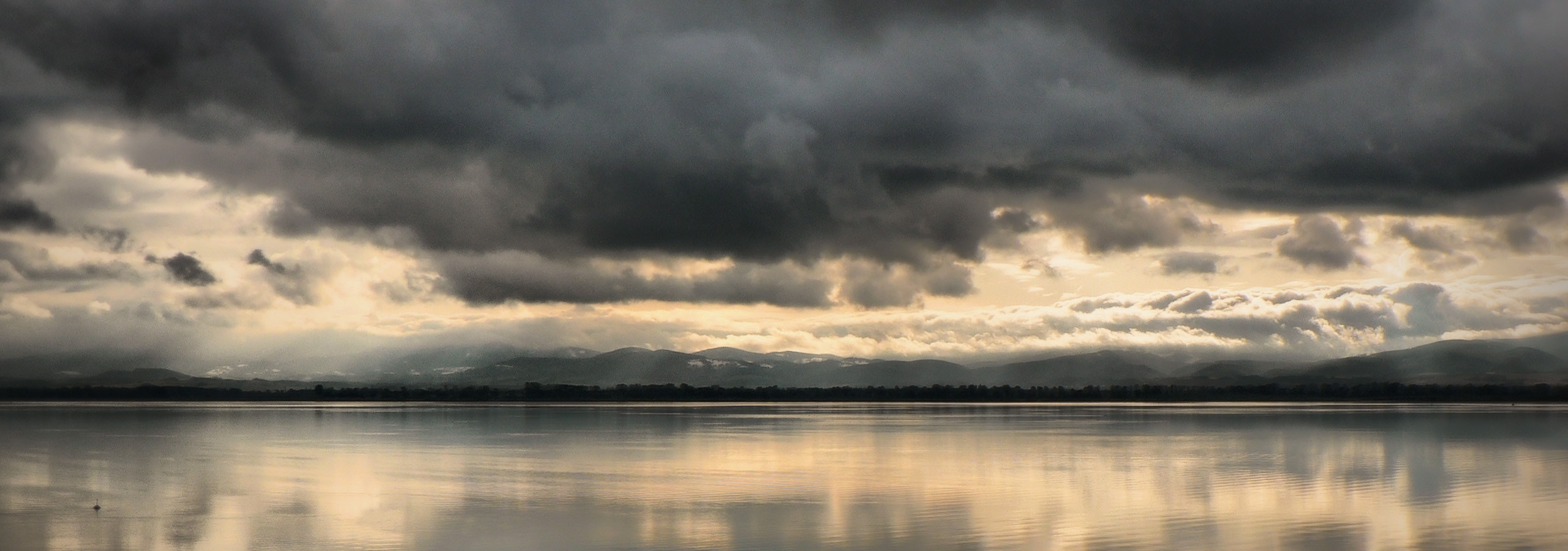
View of the lake with the Golden Mountains
