= Carl Stangen =

19th-century German businessman

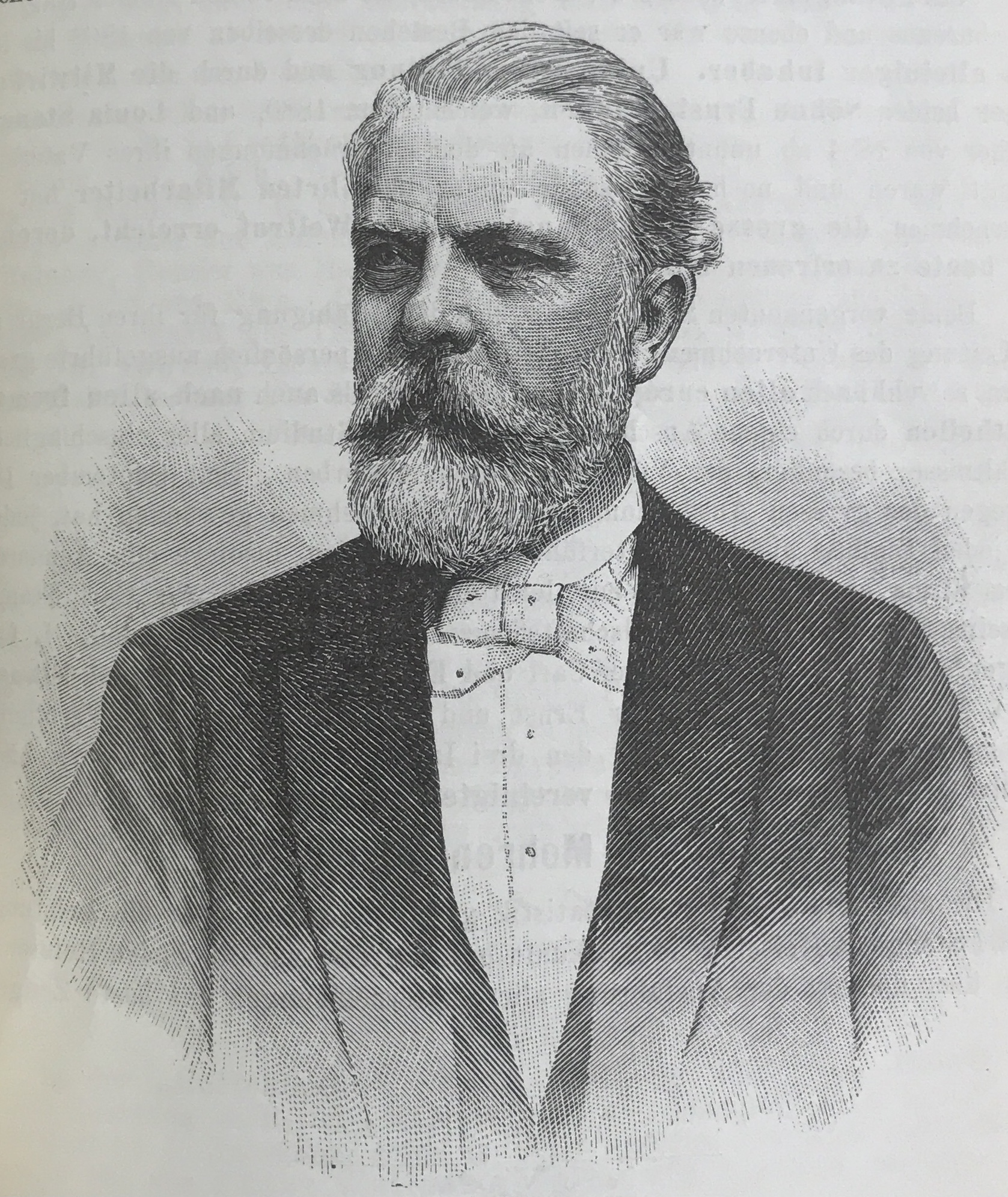
Carl Stangen (after a phoyo br Wilhelm Fechner)

Carl Friedrich Stangen (5 May 1833 – 21 November 1911) was a German entrepreneur, world traveller and writer. He founded Carl Stangens Reisebüro, Germany's first international travel agency, which earned him the designation as the German Thomas Cook.

== Life and career ==
Stangen was born in 1833 in the Upper Silesia city of Bad Ziegenhals, the son of the officer Ernst Friedrich Stangen. At the age of ten, he was sent by his father to the military educational institution in Annaburg. There, he was a pupil from 1843 to 1848. After he had been classified as unfit for medical reasons, he returned to Silesia and began a professional career in the postal service. Stangen administered the post office in Tannhausen near Bad Charlottenbrunn. In his spare time he wrote novellas and poems for newspapers and magazines.

His brother Louis Stangen (1828 in Otmuchów - 1876 in Jedlina-Zdrój) began in 1863 with the company headquarters in Breslau, to organise special and social trips. He asked his brother Carl to join the company. In 1863 and 1864, they both published travel guides and newspapers. In 1867, Louis arranged for Carl to move to Berlin. In 1868, Carl Stangen opened a travel agency there, initially with his brother. In November 1868, he went into business for himself and opened Carl Stangens Reisebüro (contemporarily Carl Stangen's Reise-Bureau). It was initially located at Mohrenstraße 10, and later a building was constructed in the oriental style at Friedrichstraße 72. The building, designed by the architect Gustav Gause, was called the Arab House.

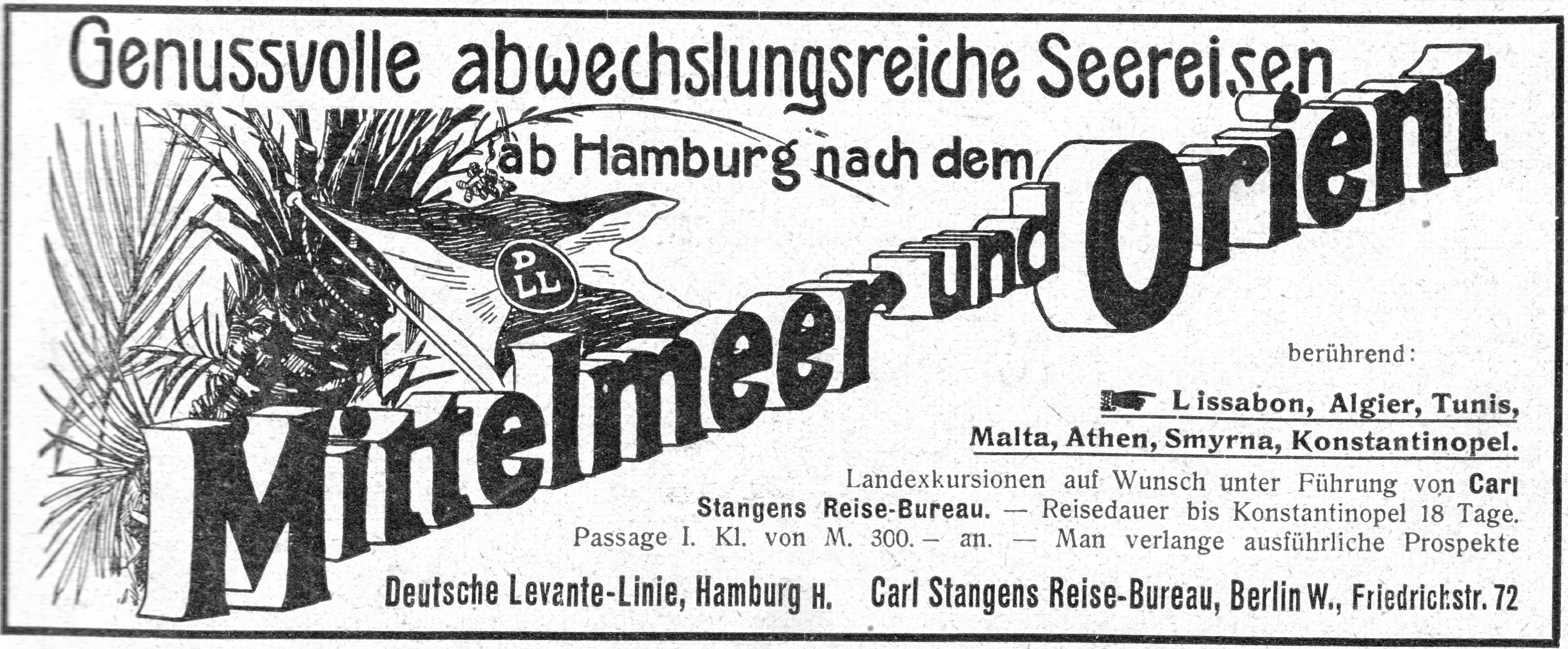
Advertisement from 1904 with the business address: Friedrichstraße 72

Between 1868 and 1899, Stangen's travel agency operated 686 trips. Among other things, a trip to Egypt was offered in 1873 and a world tour in 1878. During the Chicago World's Fair in 1893, a group called Stangen's Party formed and travelled across the North American continent. He founded and ran the travel guides and magazines Der Tourist (1884) and Stangens illustrierte Reise- und Verkehrszeitung (1894).

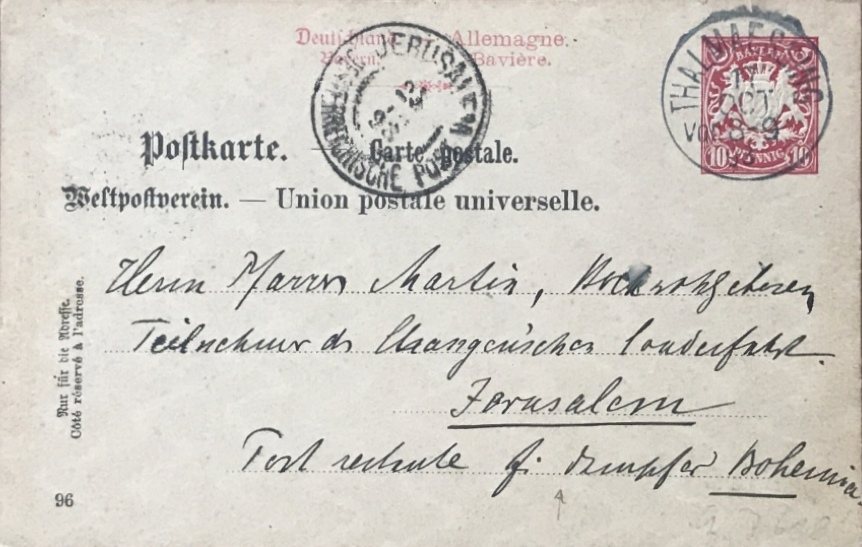
Postcard to a priest as a passenger of SS Bohemia (Stangen's special trip to Jerusalem for the opening of the Church of the Redeemer in 1898.)

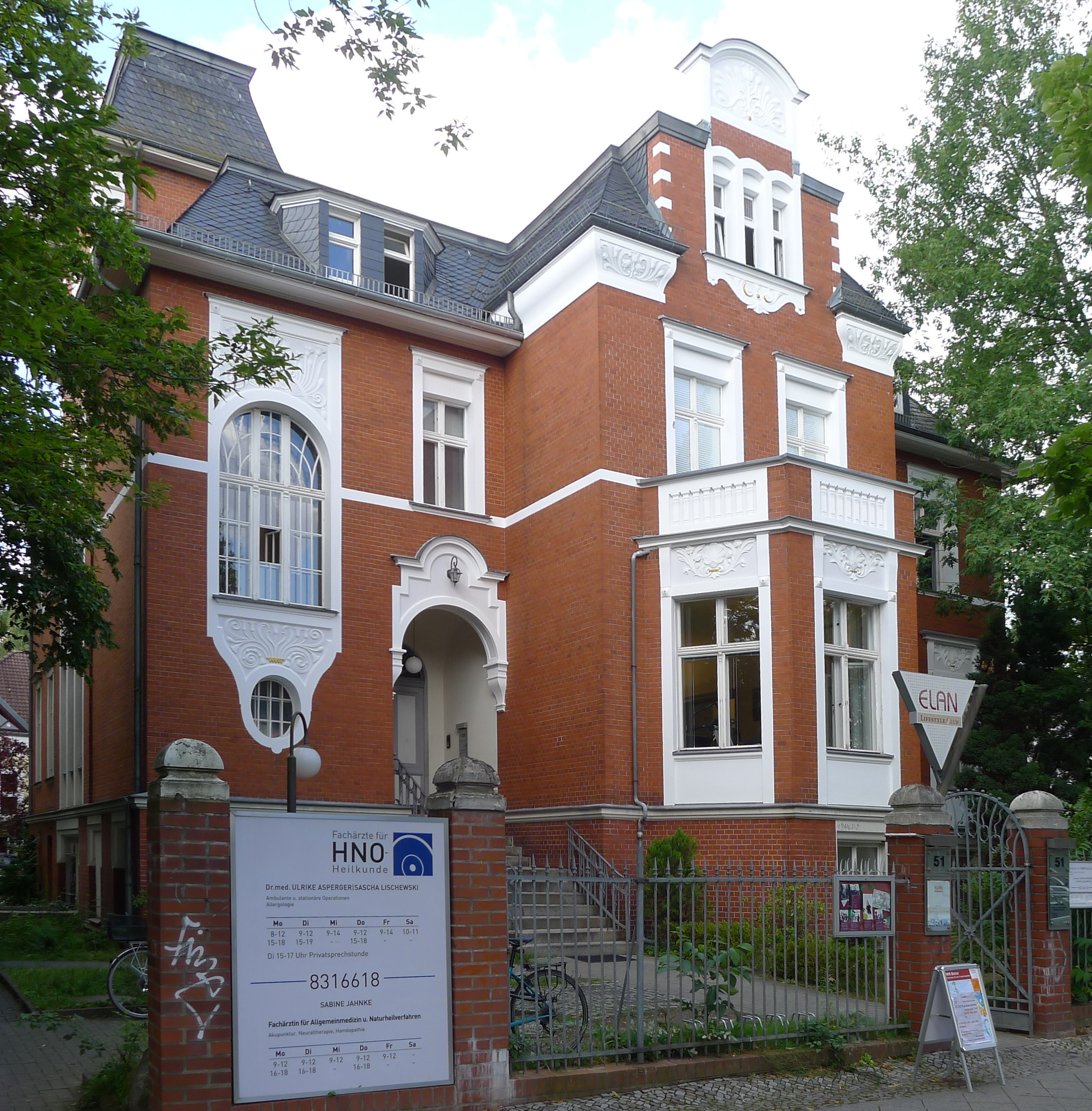
Villa Stangen in Berlin-Lichterfelde

Due to the conveniently located port of departure in Trieste, Stangen often used Österreichischer Lloyd, whose Berlin agency he also acted as, for Orient voyages and chartered the SS Bohemia from them. Due to this business connection, he was also able to offer Orient trips in October 1898, during which the participants, most of whom came from Protestant church circles, were able to take part in the Wilhelm II's voyage to the Levant in 1898, which the German Emperor carried out on 31 October 1898 as part of his Wilhelm II's voyage to the Levant in 1898 (so-called festive trip) could take part in the opening of the Church of the Redeemer, Jerusalem. For this purpose, he again chartered the SS Bohemia from the ÖL (see postcard to a participant shown opposite) and, due to the great demand, also the SS Thalia. For this voyage Carl Stangen had specially advertised in the Kreuzzeitung from 31 July 1898 (No. 353, supplement).

At the beginning of 1905, Carl Stangen sold his travel agency to the Hamburg America Line when the Hapag board of directors wanted to become more involved in tourism after the great success of their cruises. Hapag, which had previously also operated a travel agency Unter den Linden itself, renamed the company "Reisebüro der Hamburg-Amerika Linie". This merger of the two travel agencies moved Hapag up among the largest tourism providers, and the Berlin office was located on Unter den Linden. Stangen's sons Ernst and Louis continued the travel agency under their management. The company still exists today as Hapag-Lloyd Reisebüro.

In addition to his work for his father's travel agency, Stangen's son Ernst ran an "Orient-Waren-Lager" for the import and sale of "art and industrial objects from abroad". He had the Villa Stangen built at Drakestraße 51 in Lichterfelde in 1899.

== Work ==
Stangen presented his planned trips in extensive illustrated brochures. These detailed the dates and itineraries of the trips as well as the costs. There are also descriptions of particularly noteworthy journeys.

The tour operator was also the author of various travel guides. He published such guides for Palestine and Syria (1877, 1893) as well as Egypt (1882, 1893). Stangen's Illustrirter Führer durch Berlin Potsdam und Umgebungen" (Stangen's Illustrated Guide to Berlin, Potsdam and the Surroundings) was also published by S. Fischer Verlag in several editions in the 1880s and 1890s. The colour of the linen cover was based on the red colour introduced by Karl Baedeker for his travel guides. In his travel programmes, moreover, Stangen referred to the travel guides available for the respective destinations from other publishers, such as Baedeker, Meyer, Grieben and Woerl.

In order to provide his tour participants with inexpensive travel guides, Stangen also took over inexpensive editions from other publishers and had them bound with a special cover with reference to his company. Thus, for the trips he organised to the World's Fair Paris 1900, a Guide to Paris and the Surroundings (VI. edition) is available as a "Special Edition for Carl Stangen's Reise-Bureau. Berlin W., Friedrichstraße 72", which had appeared in the series Leo Woerl's Reisehandbücher.

In 1897, Joseph Abraham Stargardt published the book Aus der Mappe eines Weltbummlers. Ethnographische Genrebilder im Auftrag von Albert Halske gezeichnet von A. Wanjura [from the Portfolio of a World Traveller], in which Stangen reports on the eight-month world trip he organised between 1878 and 1879 with the participation of eight travellers. For the participants of the special trip to the opening of the Jerusalem Redeemer Church in 1898, Stangen published souvenir sheets A Trip to the Orient. The 60-page booklet, illustrated with many photos, does not, however, describe exactly the course of the special voyage, but rather the course of the Orient voyages from Trieste to Cairo and Palestine in general, which he organised several times using steamers of Österreichischer Lloyd.

== Memorial and final resting place ==
Stangen died at age 78 in Berlin-Lichterfelde, where he had lived since 1901. He was buried in the Parkfriedhof there. His gravestone has not survived.

On the occasion of his 175th birthday, a celebration was held at the "Carl Stangen Memorial Oak", which his old friends and schoolmates from the old military educational institution in Annaburg had planted on his 75th birthday (5 May 1908), and a commemorative plaque was unveiled.
