= Bělá (Eastern Neisse) =

Bělá Biała Głuchołaska
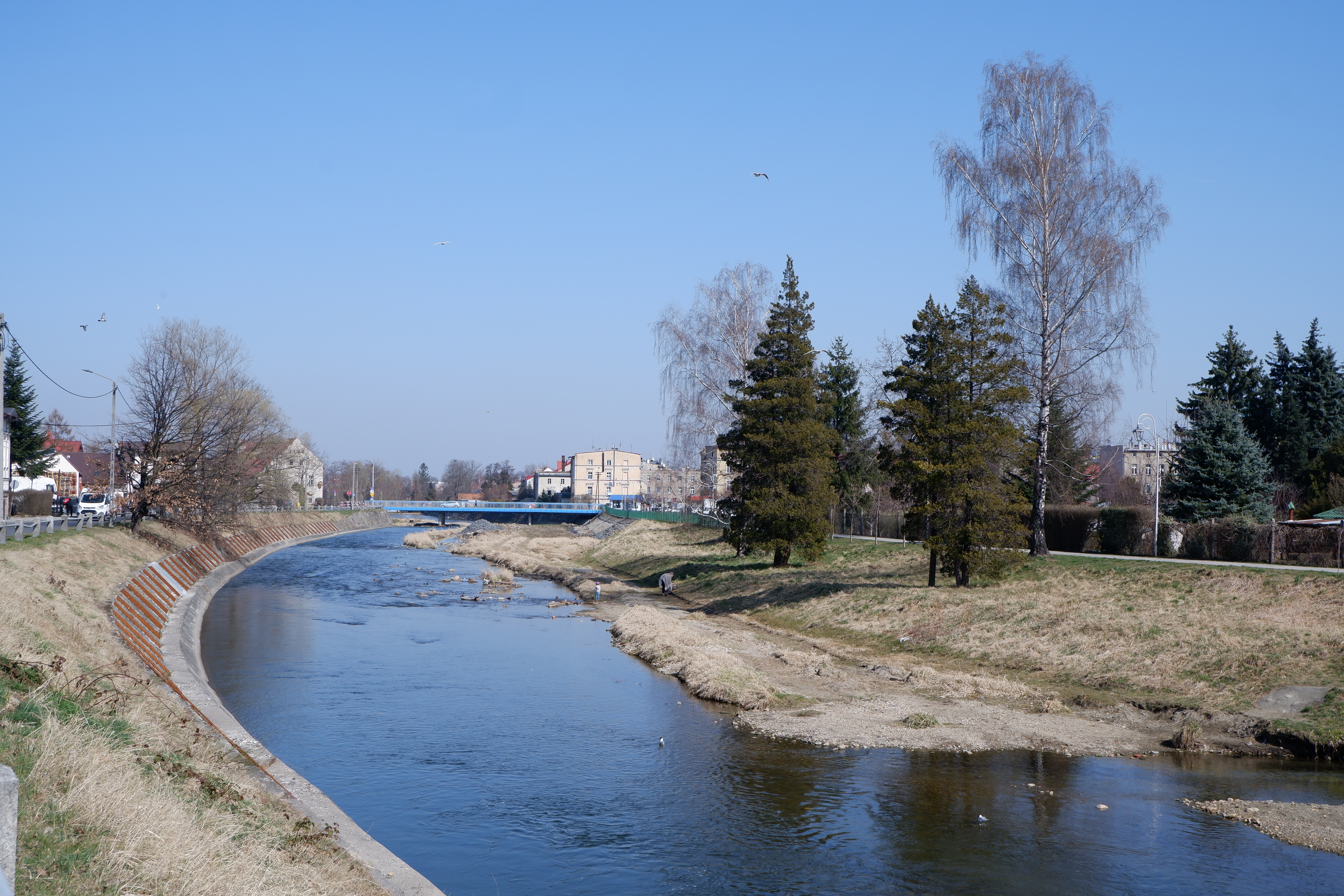
- The Bělá in Głuchołazy

Location
- Countries: Czech Republic; Poland
- Regions/ Voivodeships: Olomouc; Opole

Physical characteristics
- Source
  - location: Bělá pod Pradědem, Hrubý Jeseník
  - coordinates: 50°6′55″N 17°14′32″E
  - elevation: 908 m (2,979 ft)
- Mouth
  - location: Eastern Neisse
  - coordinates: 50°27′8″N 17°17′21″E
  - elevation: 196 m (643 ft)
- Length: 54.9 km (34.1 mi)
- Basin size: 396 km^{2} (153 sq mi)
- Discharge
  - average: 4.9 m^{3}/s (170 cu ft/s) in Głuchołazy

Basin features
- Progression: Eastern Neisse→ Oder→ Baltic Sea

The Bělá (Czech pronunciation: [ˈbjɛlaː]; Polish: Biała Głuchołaska) is a river in the Czech Republic and Poland, a right tributary of the Eastern Neisse. It flows through the Olomouc Region in the Czech Republic and through the Opole Voivodeship in Poland. It is 54.9 km (34.1 mi) long.

== Etymology ==
Bělá is a common Czech name of watercourses, derived from the Czech word bílá (i.e. 'white'). Names of rivers with this colour in the name often referred to the stony or pebbly nature of the river bed.

== Characteristic ==
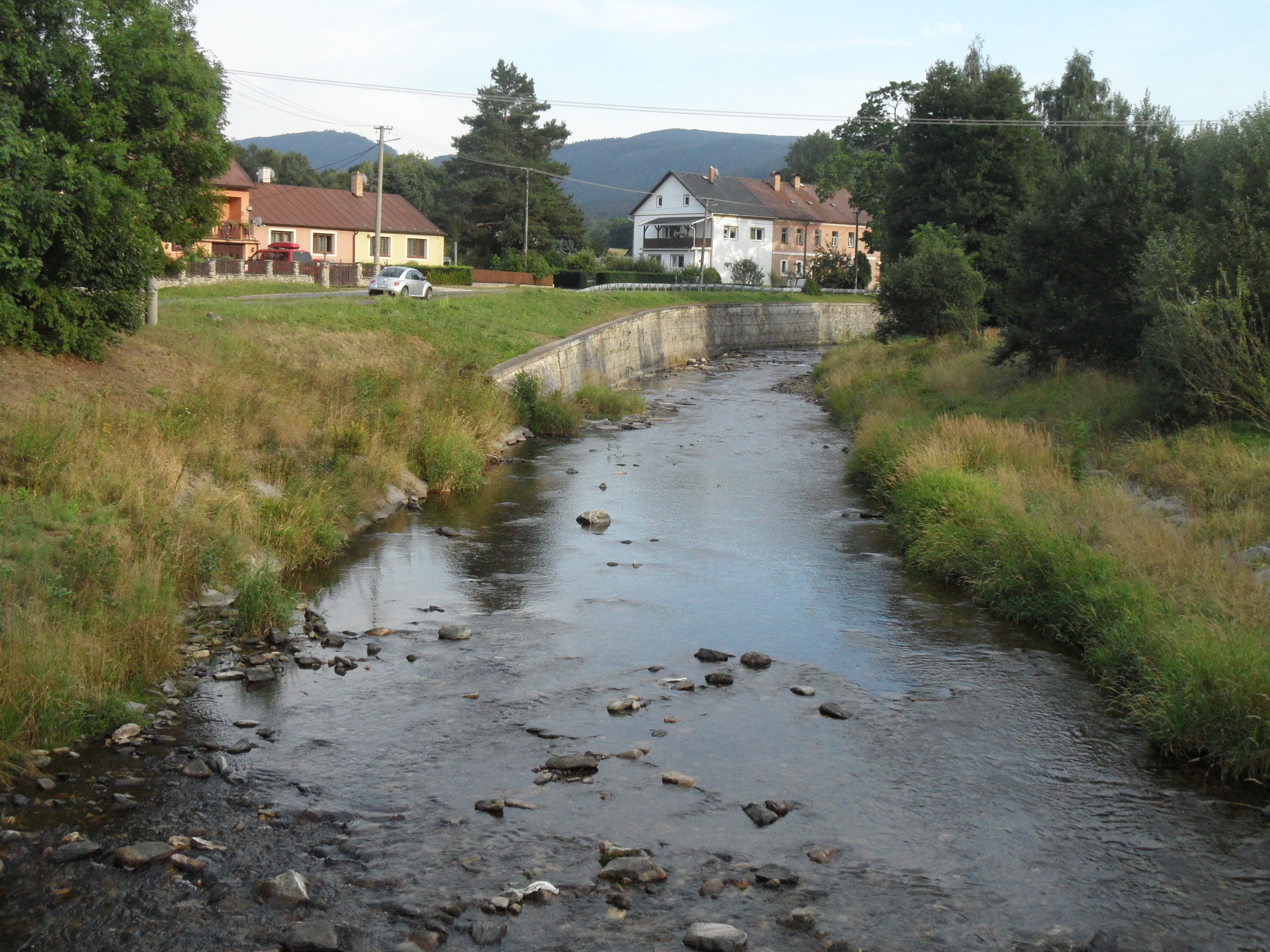
Upper course of the Bělá in Bělá pod Pradědem-Adolfovice

The Bělá originates in the territory of Bělá pod Pradědem in the Hrubý Jeseník mountain range at an elevation of 908 m (2,979 ft) and flows to Biała Nyska, where it merges with the Eastern Neisse River at an elevation of 196 m (643 ft). It is 54.9 km (34.1 mi) long, of which 33.0 km (20.5 mi) is in the Czech Republic. Its drainage basin has an area of 396 km^{2} (153 sq mi), of which 278.3 km^{2} (107.5 sq mi) is in the Czech Republic.

The average discharge in the town of Głuchołazy (before the confluence with the Mora) is 4.9 m^{3}/s (170 cu ft/s). The average discharge in Mikulovice, 4.9 km before the Czech–Polish state border, is 3.79 m^{3}/s (134 cu ft/s).

The longest tributaries of the Bělá are:

Tributary	Length (km)	Side
Mora / Kunětička	21.6	left
Staříč	14.2	left
Olešnice	13.9	right
Šumný potok	9.8	right

== Course ==
The river flows through the territories of Bělá pod Pradědem, Jeseník, Česká Ves, Písečná, Hradec-Nová Ves and Mikulovice in the Czech Republic, and continues through the territories of the gminas of Głuchołazy and Nysa in Poland.

== Bodies of water ==
The reservoir Nyskie Lake was constructed at the confluence of the Bělá and Eastern Neisse rivers. Otherwise, no fishponds or reservoirs are built on the Bělá.

== Nature ==
Most of the Bělá in the Czech Republic flows within the Jeseníky Protected Landscape Area. After crossing the border, the river flows along the western border of the Opawskie Mountains Landscape Park.

Among the protected species of animals that live in the river is the fish alpine bullhead, living in the upper course of the river.

== See also ==
- List of rivers of the Czech Republic
- List of rivers of Poland
