= Nyskie Lake =

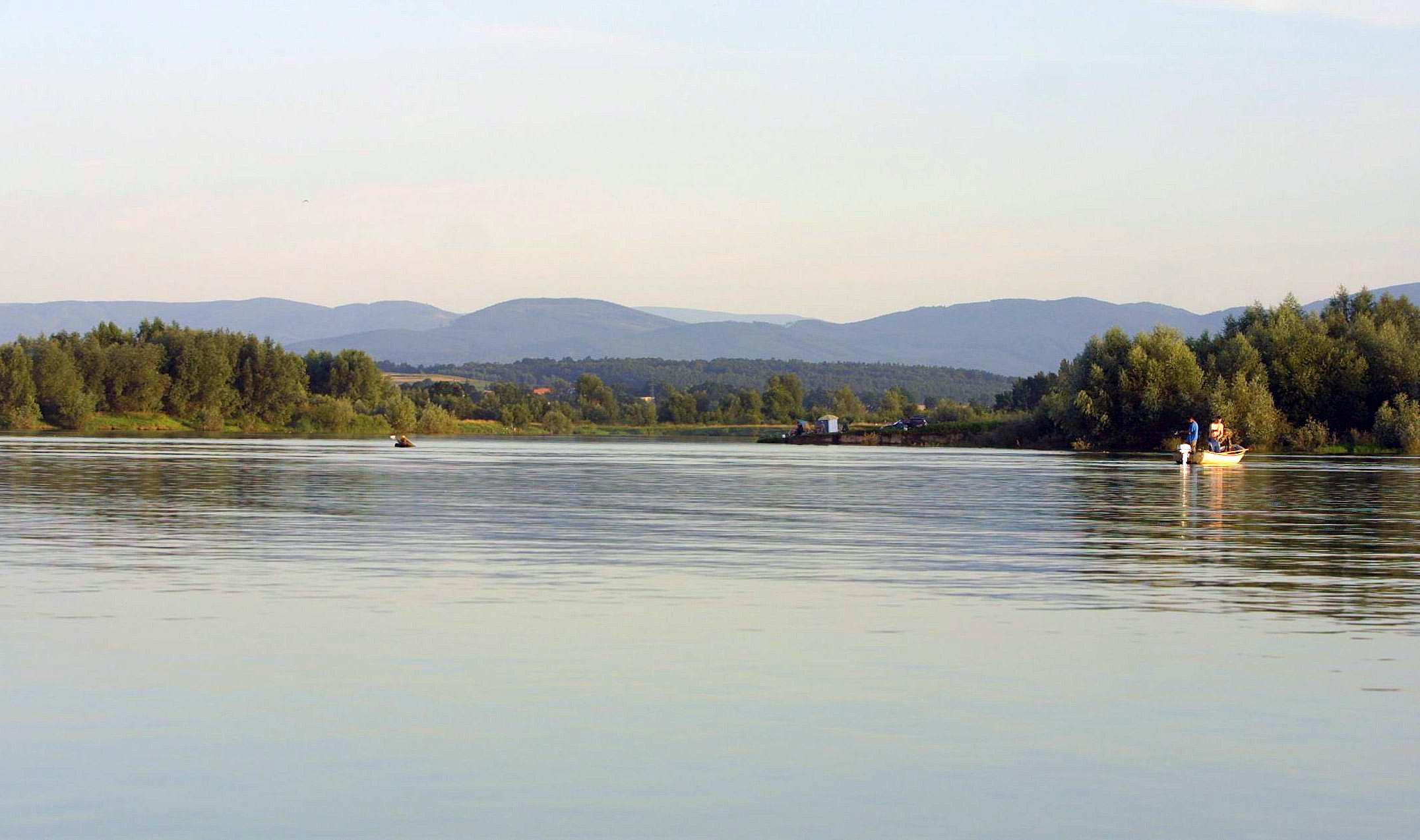

- Location within Opole Voivodeship
- Coordinates: 50°27′27″N 17°16′51″E
- Type: reservoir
- Primary inflows: Eastern Neisse, Bělá
- Primary outflows: Eastern Neisse
- Basin countries: Poland
- Surface area: 20 km^{2} (7.7 sq mi)
- Water volume: 124×10^{6} m^{3} (101,000 acre⋅ft)

Nyskie Lake (Polish: Jezioro Nyskie or Jezioro Głębinowskie) is a reservoir constructed at the confluence of the Eastern Neisse and Bělá rivers in Poland in 1971. Its name comes from the nearby town of Nysa. The dam that was used to create the reservoir is 2 kilometres (1.2 mi), and 20 metres (66 ft) high. The total area of the lake is 2,000 hectares (4,900 acres), with 124 million cubic meters of water. Before creation of the reservoir, several villages had been resettled. By the lake, a hydroelectric power plant is located.

Together with adjacent Otmuchów Lake, both reservoirs make the Otmuchów-Nysa Area of Protected Landscape (Polish: Otmuchowsko-Nyski Obszar Krajobrazu Chronionego), with several species of birds living in the region. The reservoir is located near the main national road number 46, which goes from Gliwice to Kłodzko.
