= Mikulovice (Jeseník District) =

- Municipality
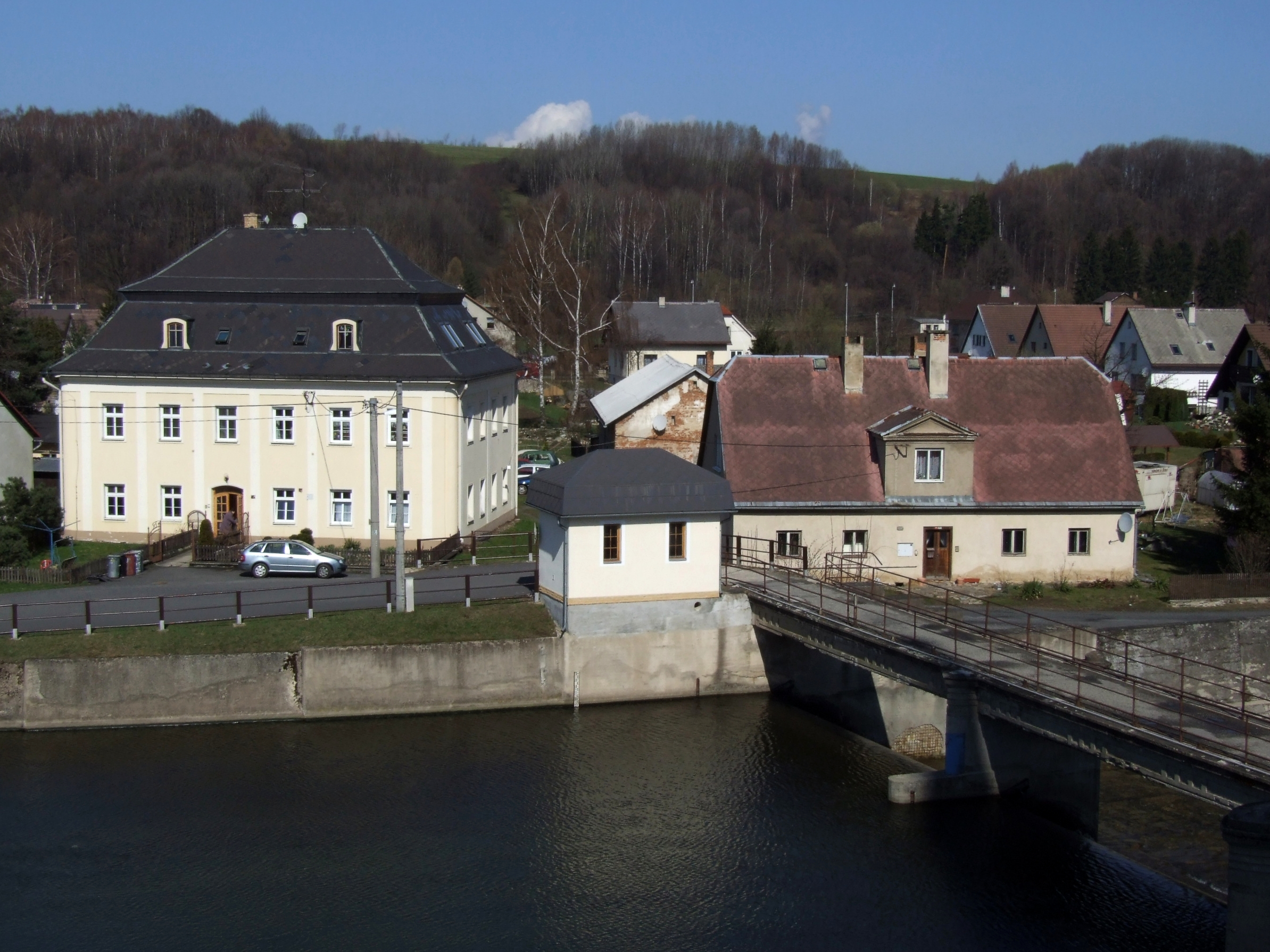
- Bridge over the Bělá River

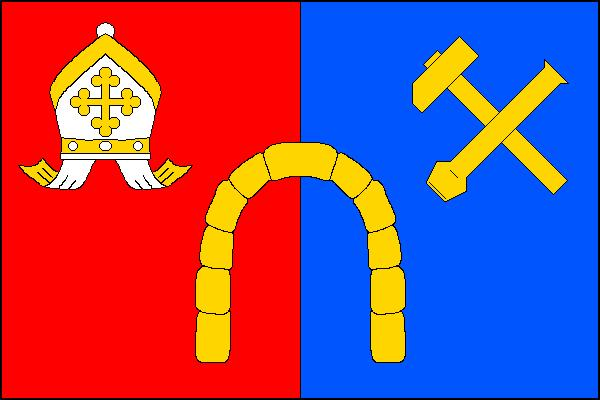
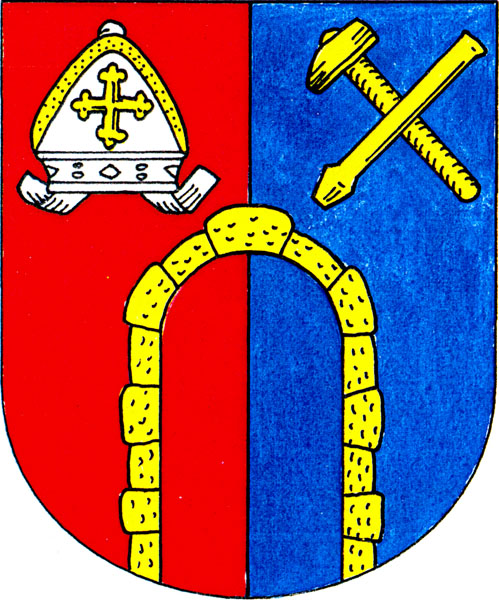
- Flag Coat of arms

- Location in the Czech Republic
- Coordinates: 50°17′55″N 17°19′18″E
- Country: Czech Republic
- Region: Olomouc
- District: Jeseník
- First mentioned: 1263

Area
  - Total: 33.30 km^{2} (12.86 sq mi)
- Elevation: 320 m (1,050 ft)

Population (2026-01-01)
  - Total: 2,462
  - Density: 73.93/km^{2} (191.5/sq mi)
- Time zone: UTC+1 (CET)
  - Summer (DST): UTC+2 (CEST)
- Postal code: 790 84
- Website: www.mikulovice.cz

Mikulovice (German: Niklasdorf, Polish: Mikułowice) is a municipality and village in Jeseník District in the Olomouc Region of the Czech Republic. It has about 2,500 inhabitants.

== Administrative division ==
Mikulovice consists of three municipal parts (in brackets population according to the 2021 census):

- Mikulovice (1,993)
- Kolnovice (79)
- Široký Brod (306)

== Geography ==
Mikulovice is located about 11 kilometres (7 mi) northeast of Jeseník and 77 km (48 mi) north of Olomouc, on the border with Poland. It lies in the Zlatohorská Highlands. The highest point is the mountains Bílé skály at 922 m (3,025 ft) above sea level. The built-up area is situated in the valley of the Bělá River. The Olešnice Stream flows into the Bělá in the village. Most of the municipal territory lies within the Jeseníky Protected Landscape Area.

== History ==
The first written mention of Mikulovice is from 1263. It was founded in the 13th century, during the colonisation by the bishops of Wrocław, who owned the area.

Mikulovice became part of the Duchy of Nysa, which later on passed under Bohemian suzerainty, and following the duchy's dissolution in 1850, it was incorporated directly into Bohemia. Following World War I, from 1918, it formed part of Czechoslovakia.

From 1938 to 1945, the municipality was occupied by Germany and administered as part of the Reichsgau Sudetenland. During World War II, the German occupying administration operated several forced labour subcamps of the Stalag VIII-B/344 prisoner-of-war camp in the village.

In 1907, Mikulovice became a market town, but lost the title during the reformation in 1949.

== Demographics ==
Historical population

Year	Pop.	±%
1869	4,014	—
1880	4,327	+7.8%
1890	4,897	+13.2%
1900	4,939	+0.9%
1910	4,947	+0.2%

Year	Pop.	±%
1921	4,688	−5.2%
1930	4,966	+5.9%
1950	2,436	−50.9%
1961	2,822	+15.8%
1970	2,797	−0.9%

Year	Pop.	±%
1980	2,813	+0.6%
1991	2,704	−3.9%
2001	2,782	+2.9%
2011	2,570	−7.6%
2021	2,378	−7.5%

Source: Censuses

== Transport ==
On the Czech–Polish border is a railway border crossing and a road border crossing, both named Mikulovice / Głuchołazy.

Mikulovice is located on the Krnov–Jeseník railway line.

== Sights ==
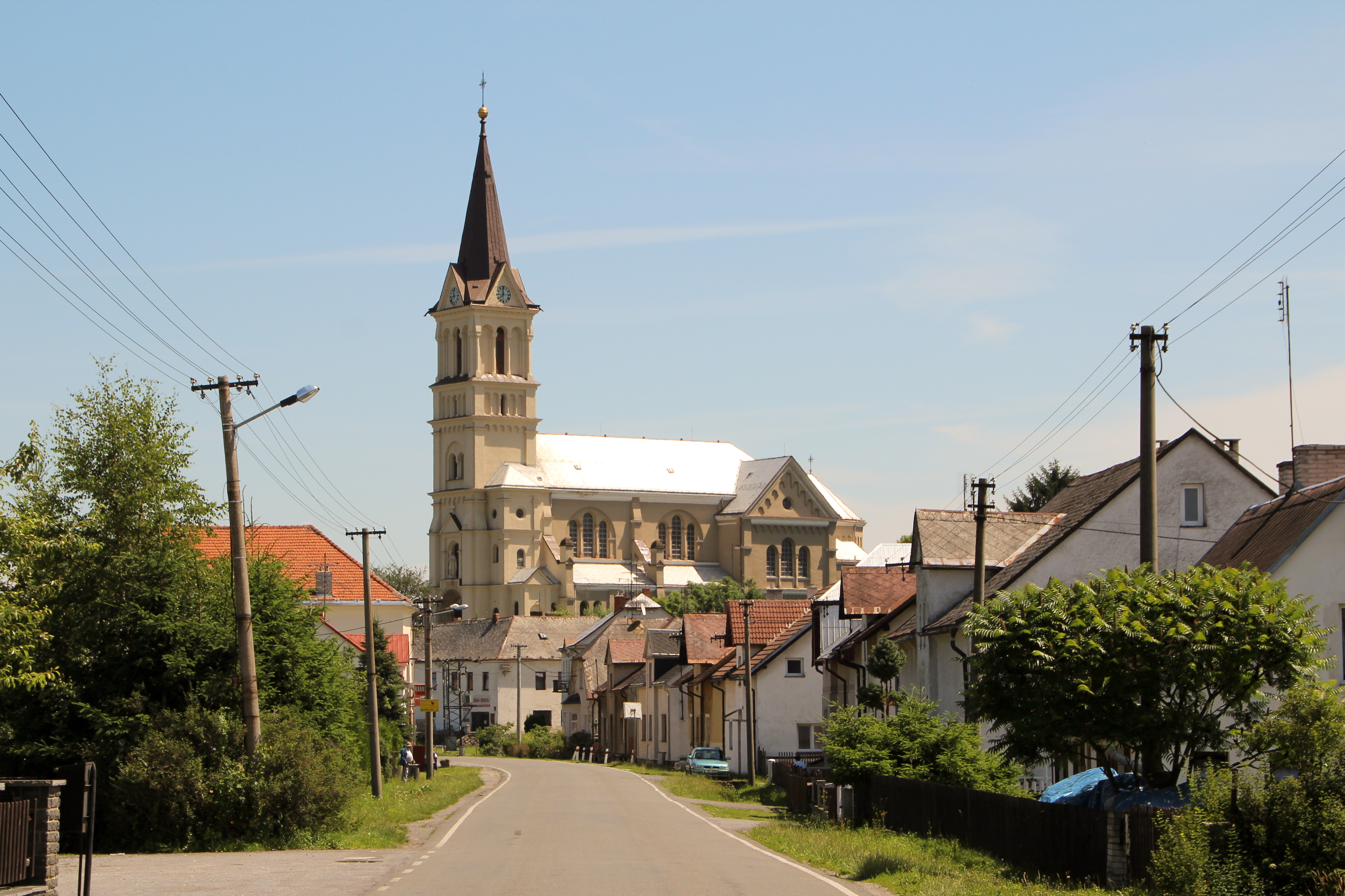
Church of Saint Nicholas

The main landmark of Mikulovice is the Church of Saint Nicholas. It was built in 1903, when it replaced an old church from 1550.

== Twin towns – sister cities ==
Mikulovice is twinned with:

- Głuchołazy, Poland
- Pakosławice, Poland

== See also ==
- Muna (Mikulovice)
