= Szymon Koszyk =

Polish writer (1891–1972)

Szymon Koszyk (3 July 1891, Opole – 11 August 1972, Opole) was a Polish writer, national and social activist. He finished Teachers' Seminary in Prószków. He collaborated with Gazeta Opolska and Der Weisse Adler. He was conscripted to the German army in 1914, he fought in the Battle of Verdun and was severely wounded. In 1918 he deserted from the German Army and hid in Tarnów. There he formed a battalion of Polish soldiers and with its help he captured local Austrian garrison. In 1919 he returned to Opole and was sent by the local Poles to the Paris peace conference to represent Polish interests in Silesia. On 3 May 1920 he organised a march in Opole to commemorate the anniversary of adoption of the first Polish and second worldwide Constitution (the Constitution of 3 May 1791). The march was disrupted by local German militias who attacked Polish demonstrants.
