= Hnutí Brontosaurus =

Czech nature conservation group

Logo of Brontosaurus

Hnutí Brontosaurus (-Czech, translated to English as "The Brontosaurus Movement") is a large nature conservation group in the Czech Republic focused on the youth. Brontosaurus was founded in 1974, making it the first organization of its kind in Czechoslovakia. It was named after the Brontosaurus, a name which was at the time widely used as a synonym for "dinosaur" among the Czechs. The chosen name was to remind of the fate of the dinosaurs, which died out during the Cretaceous–Paleogene extinction event.

The founders were several young enthusiasts from the Institute of Landscape Ecology of the Czechoslovak Academy of Sciences. Their preparations had started in 1972. The plan was covered in a popular journal for the youth, Mladý Svět, whose illustrator Vladimír Jiránek sketched the logo. In January 1974 "Akce Brontosaurus" (Action Brontosaurus) started as a collection of ten tasks focused on environmental education and to be finished within one year. Unexpected success led to an indefinite extension of the programme and appearance of regional branches. Since 1978 Mladý Svět adopted it under the name "Holidays with Brontosaurus" (Prázdniny s Brontosaurem), massively adding to its popularity. In the same year Brontosaurus had to become a collective member of the Socialist Union of Youth, a pro-regime political organization aiming to completely cater to the youth population. Brontosaurus organized numerous festivals, propagation tours and competitions and has managed to increase awareness about numerous ecological problems.

After the fall of communist party in 1989 Brontosaurus became an independent organization and restructured internally. The organization decided to focus on free time activities and education and avoid involvement in politics. In 1992 a group of members left and set up the independent "Asociace Brontosaura" (Association Brontosaurus). In 1996 a conflict between two groups within Brontosaurus almost broke it apart; discovery of embezzlement further worsened the situation. The conflict became largely resolved during Autumn 1999 - 2000 but the organization was financially ruined. Embezzlement by a former leader of Jeseníky Regional Centre was discovered and than Czech ministry of education stepped providing financial support about over 80% of Brontosaurus Movement budget in 2001.

As of 2007 Hnutí Brontosaurus has around 1,000 members structured into 30 local groups. Focusing on children and the youth, they organize weekend trips, summer camps, illustrated humour competition "Ekofór", education tours and courses and also ecological consultations. The budget in 2005 was around 1.6 million CZK. About two thirds of the income came as grants by the government and municipalities, about one third was profit from business activities.
