= Paczkowski Lake =

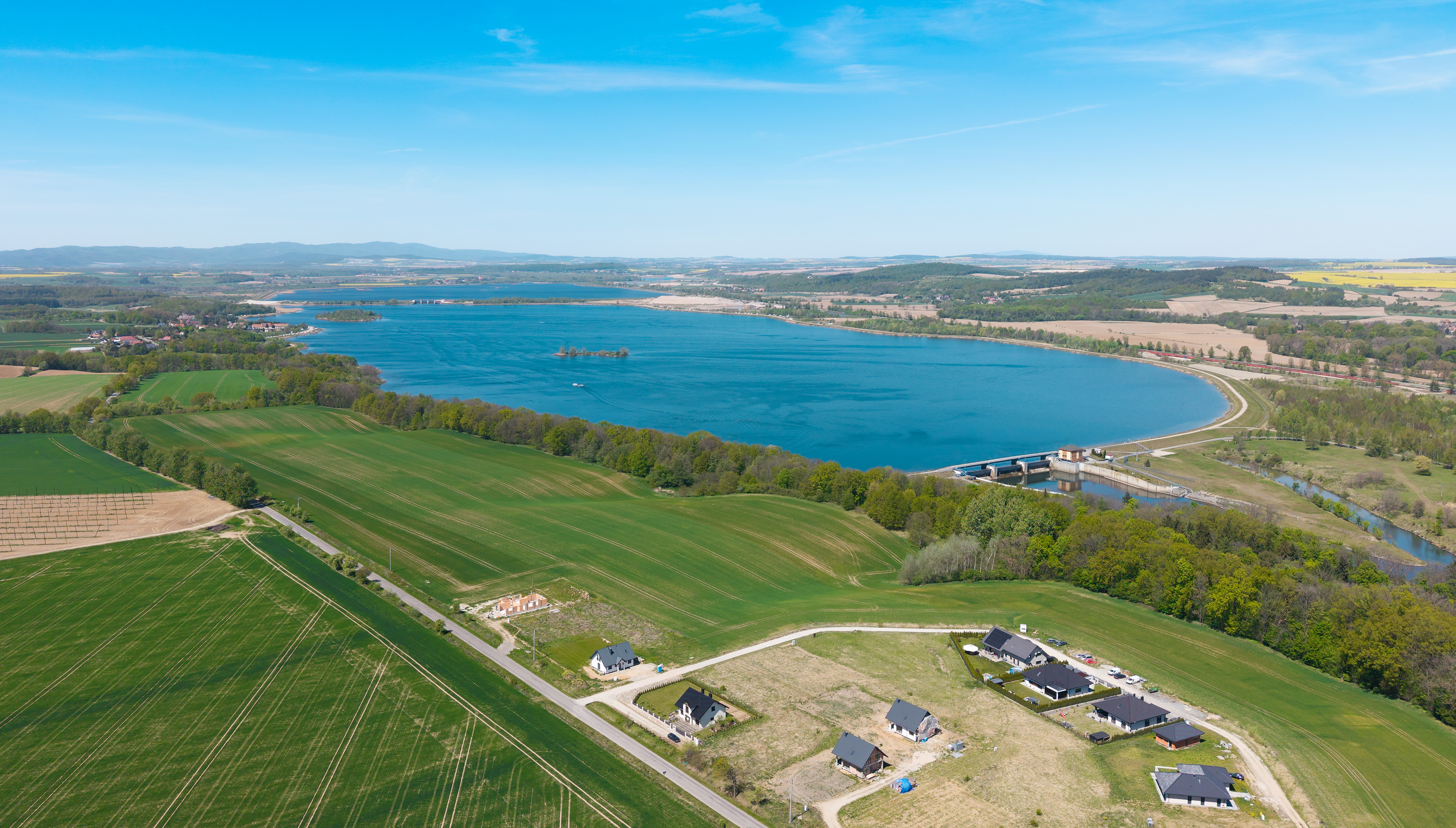

- Location within Opole Voivodeship
- Coordinates: 50°28′30″N 16°58′02″E
- Type: reservoir
- Primary inflows: Nysa Kłodzka
- Primary outflows: Nysa Kłodzka
- Basin countries: Poland
- Surface area: 6.9 km^{2} (2.7 sq mi)
- Water volume: 42.9×10^{6} m^{3} (34,800 acre⋅ft)

Paczkowski Lake is a retention reservoir which was constructed due to the flooding of the river Nysa Kłodzka's by the overflow of the lakes which have been part of the river, the reservoir is made up of two reservoirs, Kozielno and Topola, and is located on the border of the Lower Silesian Voivodeship and Opole Voivodeship. The main function of the reservoir is to protect the area against floods. The gravel pit in the reservoir works as an extraction of gravel. The water flow in the reservoir is also used for generating energy in both of the outflows there are dams. The full capacity of the reservoir is 42,9 million m³.
