= Otmuchów–Przeworno railway =

Railway line in Poland

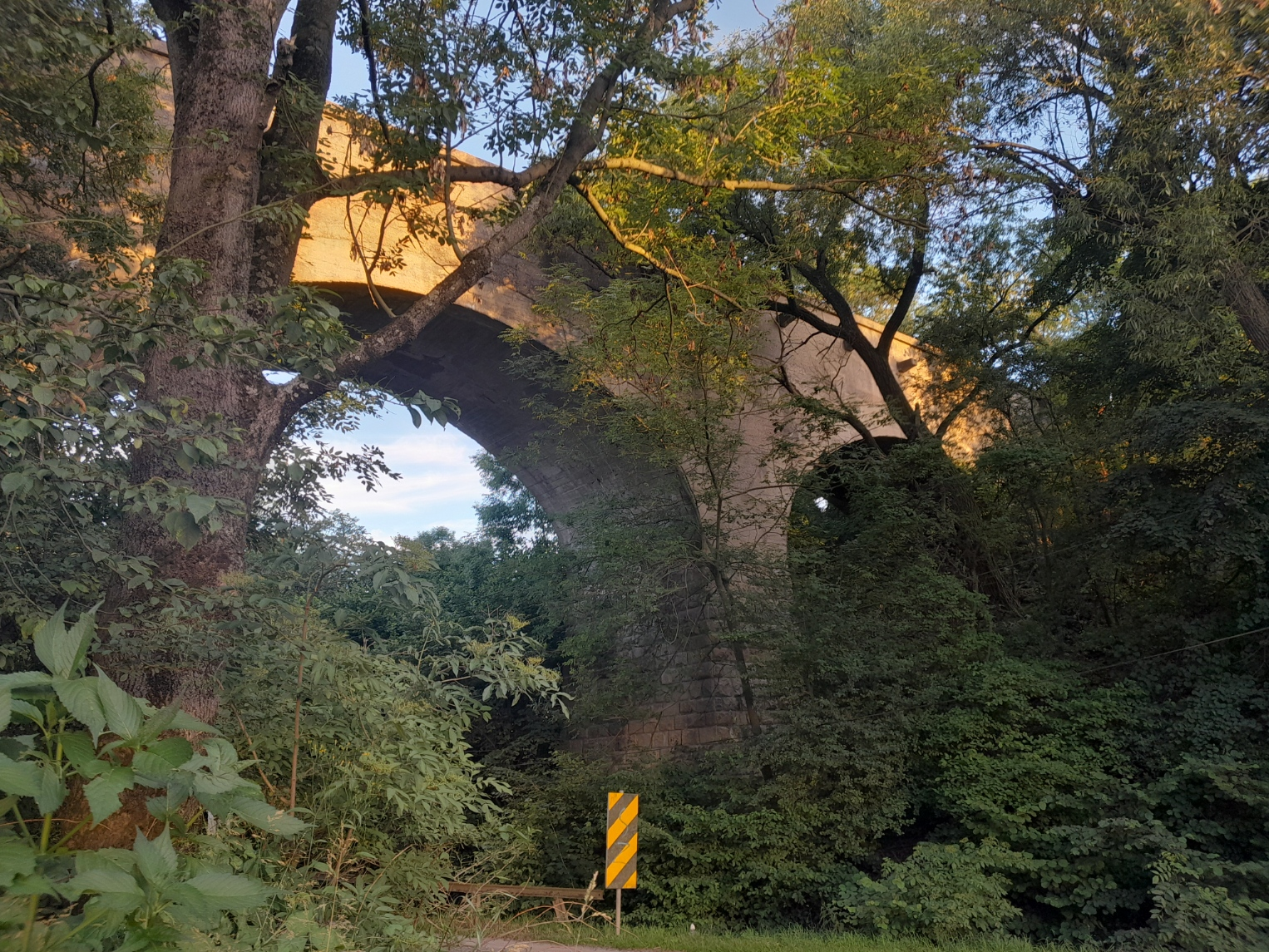
- Railway bridge in Maciejowice in 2026

Overview
- Status: Defunct
- Owner: KPEV; DR; PKP PLK
- Line number: 313
- Locale: Poland
- Termini: Otmuchów; Przeworno
- Connecting lines: Sudeten Main Line; Grodków–Głęboka railway
- Stations: 9

Service
- Type: Heavy rail

History
- Opened: 15 September 1910
- Last extension: 1 October 1910
- Closed: 1 July 1987

Technical
- Line length: 32.1 km (19.9 mi)
- Number of tracks: Single track
- Track gauge: 1,435 mm (4 ft 8 1/2 in) standard gauge
- Operating speed: 30 km/h (19 mph)

The Otmuchów–Przeworno railway is a defunct 32.1 km (19.9 mi) long branchline in Poland, connecting the town of Otmuchów and the village of Przeworno. The railway line opened in 1910, passenger traffic was fully reactivated in 1959, passenger traffic was ceased in 1976 and was closed in 1987.

The railway used to be numbered 204 according to D29 from 1949, the number changed to 260 in 1971, and changed to the current number 313 in 1985 where its current number is still used after the closure.

== Route ==
The line starts at Otmuchów railway station on the Sudeten Main Line, it starts heading west crossing Warszawska street and shifts north in Sarnowice. The line curves east north east to Kasztanówka street, and north north west to Maciejowice passing Maciejowice railway station (3.6 km of the line), after passing the station the line curves east crossing the road from Nieradowice via a tall stone viaduct, and heads north again.

The line shifts to Ogonów passing a hill near Starowice and Ogonów railway station (8.1 km of the line), next it heads to Karłowice Małe where it passes Kłobodok railway station (11.7 km of the line), heading to Cieszanowice the line shifts north west passing Cieszanowice forest and shifts north passing Cieszanowice railway station (18 km of the line). The line shifts north east and curves north to Szklary, eventually passing Szklary railway station (19.9 km of the line).

Crossing the Opole-Lower Silesian Voivodeship border, it curves to Jagielno passing both hills near Mokrzyce and Jagielno, and Jagielno railway station (24.2 km of the line). Curving north west the line crosses Voivodeship road 385 and curves north passing Sarby railway station (27.3 km of the line) near Sarby, after the railway station the line follows the road to Krynka, where it heads north east once it reaches the village. The line heads north north east after passing a loading area on the curve and stops at Przeworno railway station on the Grodków–Głęboka railway.
