= Konary Castle =

Castle in Konary, Strzelin County, Poland

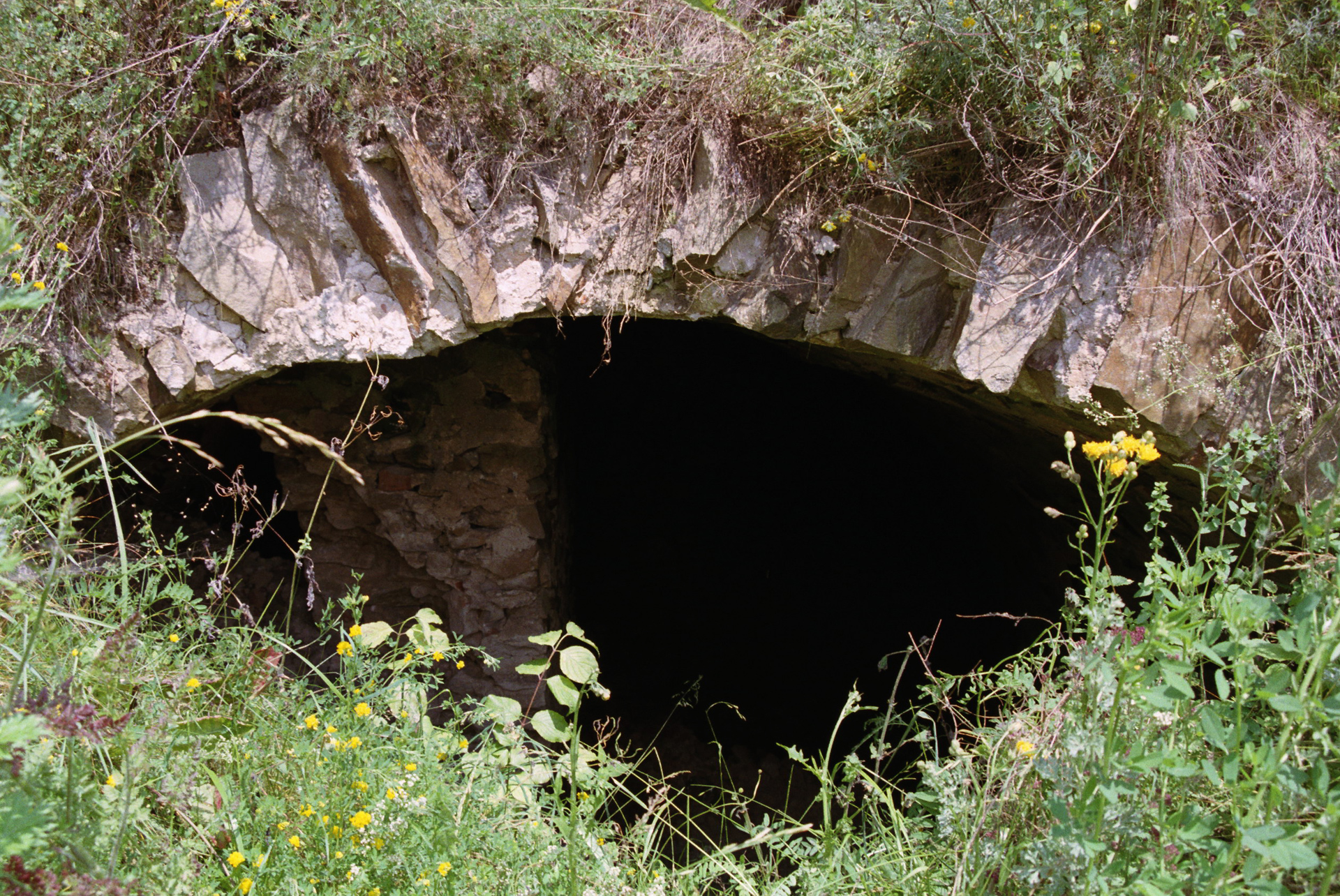
- Remains of the Konary Castle

- Location within Poland
- 50.654137°N 17.152048°E
- Location: Konary, Poland

History
- Built: 13th century

Konary Castle is a castle in the village Konary, Lower Silesia, Poland, located 55 km south of the city of Wrocław.

The castle Kunern belonged since 1730 to the estate Mittel-Schreibendorf (Sarby) owned by the family von Gaffron. The palace is located 45 km northwest of Mittel-Schreibendorf. The Kunern Castle consist of three different manor houses and built in three different centuries—the oldest from early Middle Ages, the largest built in 1736 and the newest from 1900 century. The main castle in Kunern was built in by Balle Marimilian von Gaffron und Oberstradam (1714-1774) together his wife Julianne Elisabeth von Lohenstein (1717-1746). The Kunern castle is a castle complex with a community.
