= Wieliczna =

Wieliczna may refer to the following places in Poland:

- Wieliczna, Lower Silesian Voivodeship (south-west Poland)
- Wieliczna, Masovian Voivodeship (east-central Poland)
