= Mników =

Mników may refer to the following places in Poland:

- Mników, Lower Silesian Voivodeship (south-west Poland)
- Mników, Lesser Poland Voivodeship (south Poland)
