= Samborowice =

Samborowice may refer to the following places in Poland:

- Samborowice, Lower Silesian Voivodeship (south-west Poland)
- Samborowice, Silesian Voivodeship (south Poland)
