= Stanica =

Stanica may refer to:

- stanitsa, a Cossack village and unit of rural organization
- Stanica, Lower Silesian Voivodeship (south-west Poland)
- Stanica, Silesian Voivodeship (south Poland)
- Stanica is also a Romanian name
