= Rożnów =

Rożnów may refer to the following places in Poland:

- Rożnów, Lower Silesian Voivodeship (south-west Poland)
- Rożnów, Lesser Poland Voivodeship (south Poland)
- Rożnów, Opole Voivodeship (south-west Poland)
- Lake Rożnów in Lsser Poland Voivodeship
