= Głowaczów =

Głowaczów may refer to the following places in Poland:

- Głowaczów, Lower Silesian Voivodeship (south-west Poland)
- Głowaczów, Masovian Voivodeship (east-central Poland)
