= Cierpice =

Cierpice may refer to the following places in Poland:

- Cierpice, Lower Silesian Voivodeship (south-west Poland)
- Cierpice, Kuyavian-Pomeranian Voivodeship (north-central Poland)
