= Królewiec =

Królewiec may refer to:

- The Polish name for Kaliningrad, Kaliningrad Oblast, Russia (formerly Königsberg)
- The Polish name for Krolevets, Sumy Oblast, Ukraine
- Królewiec, Lower Silesian Voivodeship, Poland
- Królewiec, Świętokrzyskie Voivodeship, Poland
- Królewiec, Masovian Voivodeship, Poland
- Królewiec, Greater Poland Voivodeship, Poland
