= Strużyna =

Strużyna may refer to the following places in Poland:

- Strużyna, Lower Silesian Voivodeship (south-west Poland)
- Strużyna, Warmian-Masurian Voivodeship (north Poland)
