= Krynka =

Krynka may refer to several places:

- Krynka, Lower Silesian Voivodeship, southwestern Poland
- Krynka, Lublin Voivodeship, eastern Poland
- Krynka (river), Ukraine
