= Gmina Przeworno =

Gmina Przeworno Przeworno Commune
- Gmina
- Flag Coat of arms
- Interactive map of Gmina Przeworno
- Coordinates (Przeworno): 50°41′N 17°1′E
- Country: Poland
- Voivodeship: Lower Silesian
- County: Strzelin
- Seat: Przeworno
- Sołectwos: Cierpice, Dobroszów, Dzierzkowa, Jagielnica, Jagielno, Jegłowa, Karnków, Konary, Krzywina, Miłocice, Mników, Ostrężna, Przeworno, Romanów, Rożnów, Samborowice, Samborowiczki, Sarby, Strużyna

Area
  - Total: 111.96 km^{2} (43.23 sq mi)

Population (2019-06-30)
  - Total: 4,786
  - Density: 42.75/km^{2} (110.7/sq mi)
- Website: http://www.przeworno.pl/

Gmina Przeworno is a rural gmina (administrative district) in Strzelin County, Lower Silesian Voivodeship, in south-western Poland. Its seat is the village of Przeworno, which lies approximately 12 kilometres (7 mi) south of Strzelin, and 50 kilometres (31 mi) south of the regional capital Wrocław. It is part of the Wrocław metropolitan area.

The gmina covers an area of 111.96 square kilometres (43.2 sq mi), and as of 2019 its total population is 4,786.

== Neighbouring gminas ==
Gmina Przeworno is bordered by the gminas of Grodków, Kamiennik, Strzelin, Wiązów and Ziębice.

== Villages ==
The gmina contains the villages of Cierpice, Dobroszów, Dzierzkowa, Głowaczów, Jagielnica, Jagielno, Jegłowa, Karnków, Kaszówka, Konary, Królewiec, Krynka, Krzywina, Miłocice, Mników, Ostrężna, Płosa, Pogroda, Przeworno, Romanów, Rożnów, Samborowice, Samborowiczki, Sarby, Stanica, Strużyna, Wieliczna and Wieliszów.
