= Goworowice =

- Village
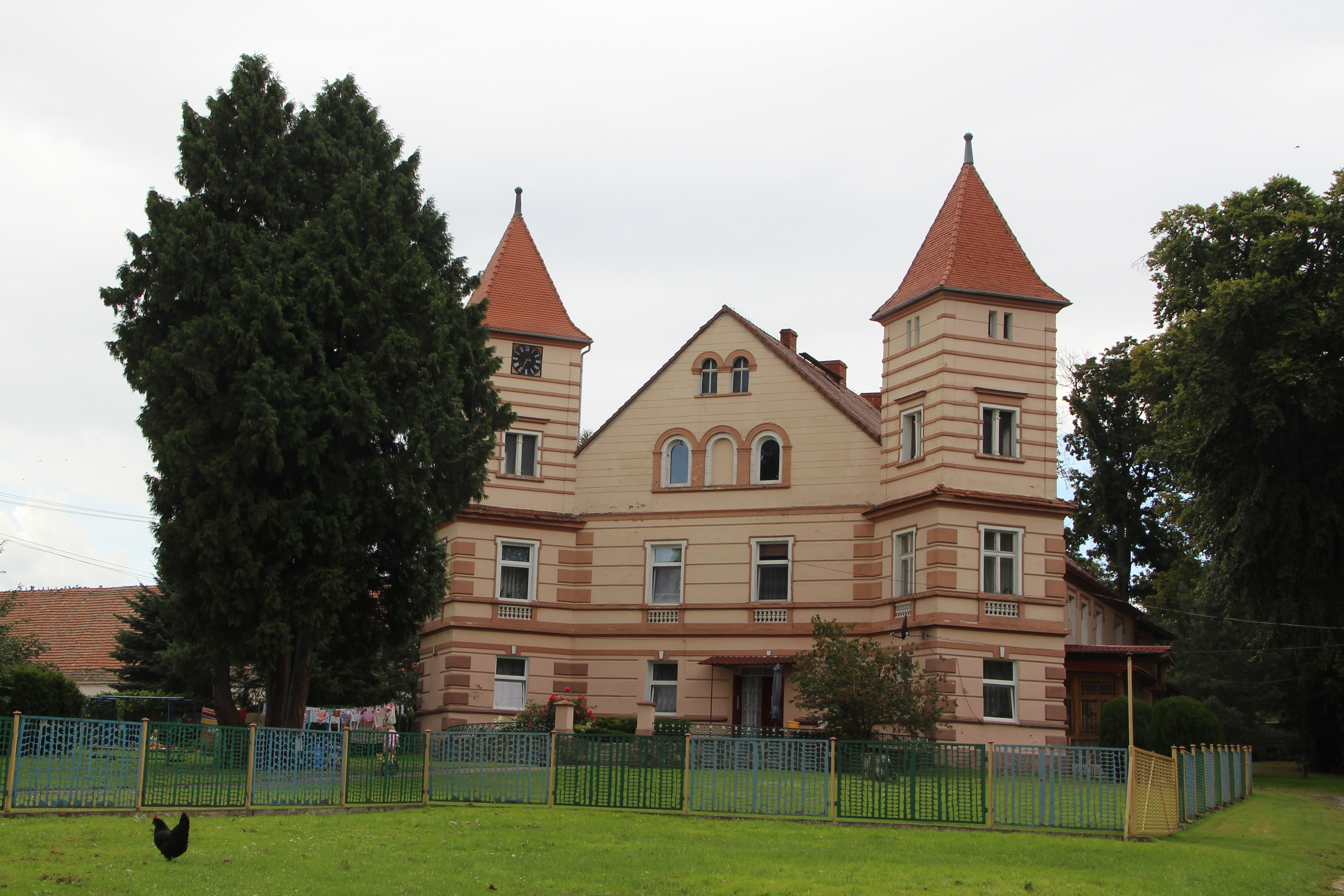
- Palace

- Location within Poland
- Coordinates: 50°32′39″N 17°8′18″E
- Country: Poland
- Voivodeship: Opole
- County: Nysa
- Gmina: Kamiennik
- Population: 370

Goworowice [ɡɔvɔrɔˈvit͡sɛ] (German: Gauers) is a village in the administrative district of Gmina Kamiennik, within Prudnik County, Opole Voivodeship, in south-western Poland.
