= Ostrężna =

- Village
- Location within Poland
- Coordinates: 50°40′32″N 17°6′39″E
- Country: Poland
- Voivodeship: Lower Silesian
- County: Strzelin
- Gmina: Przeworno

Ostrężna [ɔsˈtrɛ̃ʐna] is a village in the administrative district of Gmina Przeworno, within Strzelin County, Lower Silesian Voivodeship, in south-western Poland.
