= Sarby Castle =

Manor house in Sarby, Poland

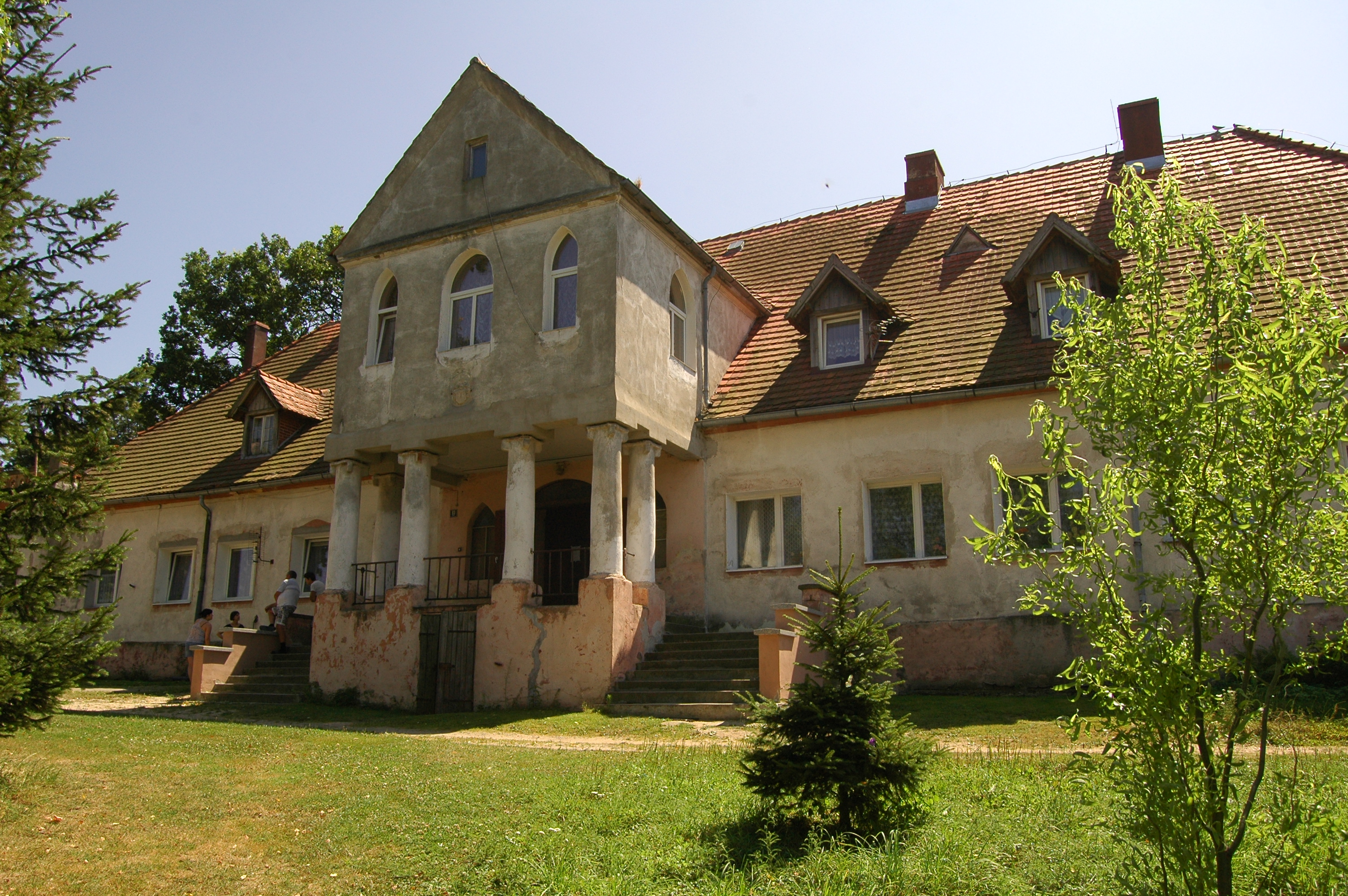
- Location: Sarby, Poland

Sarby Castle is located in the village Sarby, about 45 km southwest of the city of Wrocław in Lower Silesian Voivodeship, Poland.

The manor house of Sarby was owned by the von Gaffron family from 1740 to short after 1900.
