= Dobroszów, Strzelin County =

Dobroszów
- Village
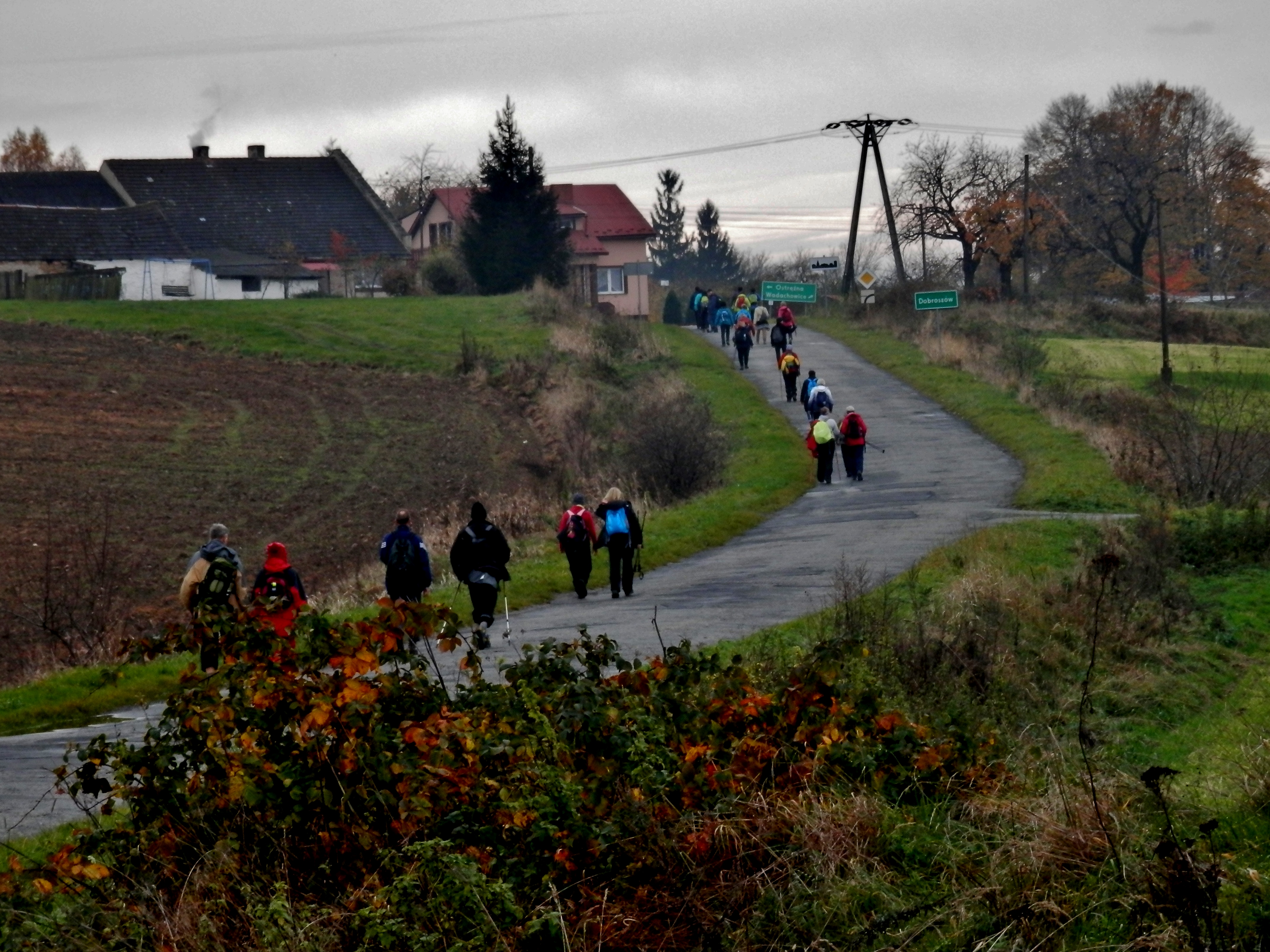

- Location within Poland
- Coordinates: 50°41′27″N 17°04′57″E
- Country: Poland
- Voivodeship: Lower Silesian
- County: Strzelin
- Gmina: Przeworno

Dobroszów [dɔˈbrɔʂuf] is a village in the administrative district of Gmina Przeworno, within Strzelin County, Lower Silesian Voivodeship, in south-western Poland.
