= Romanów, Lower Silesian Voivodeship =

Romanów
- Village
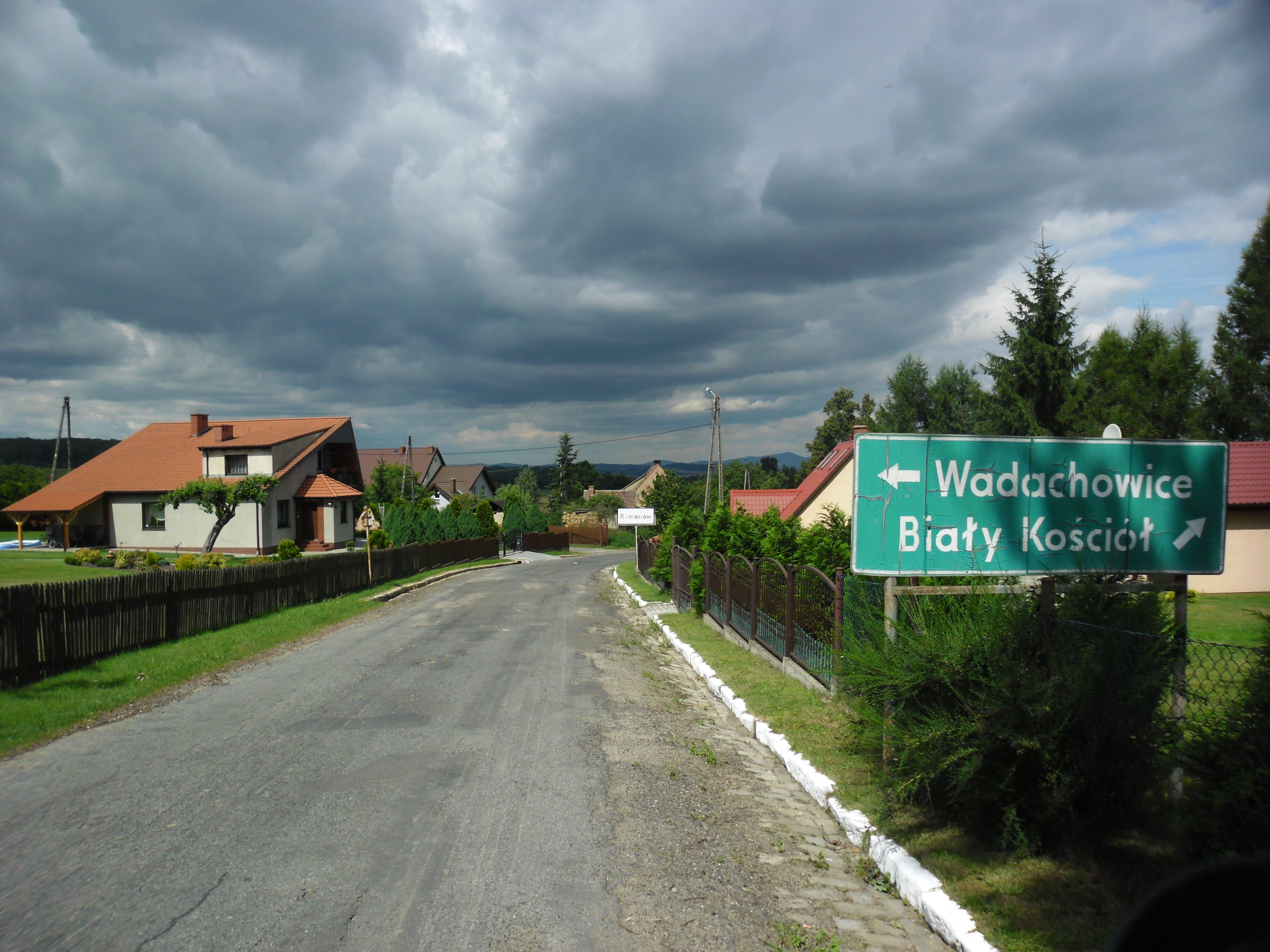
- Romanów

- Location within Poland
- Coordinates: 50°41′48″N 17°05′46″E
- Country: Poland
- Voivodeship: Lower Silesian
- County: Strzelin
- Gmina: Przeworno

Romanów [rɔˈmanuf] is a village in the administrative district of Gmina Przeworno, within Strzelin County, Lower Silesian Voivodeship, in south-western Poland.
