= Kaszówka =

- Village
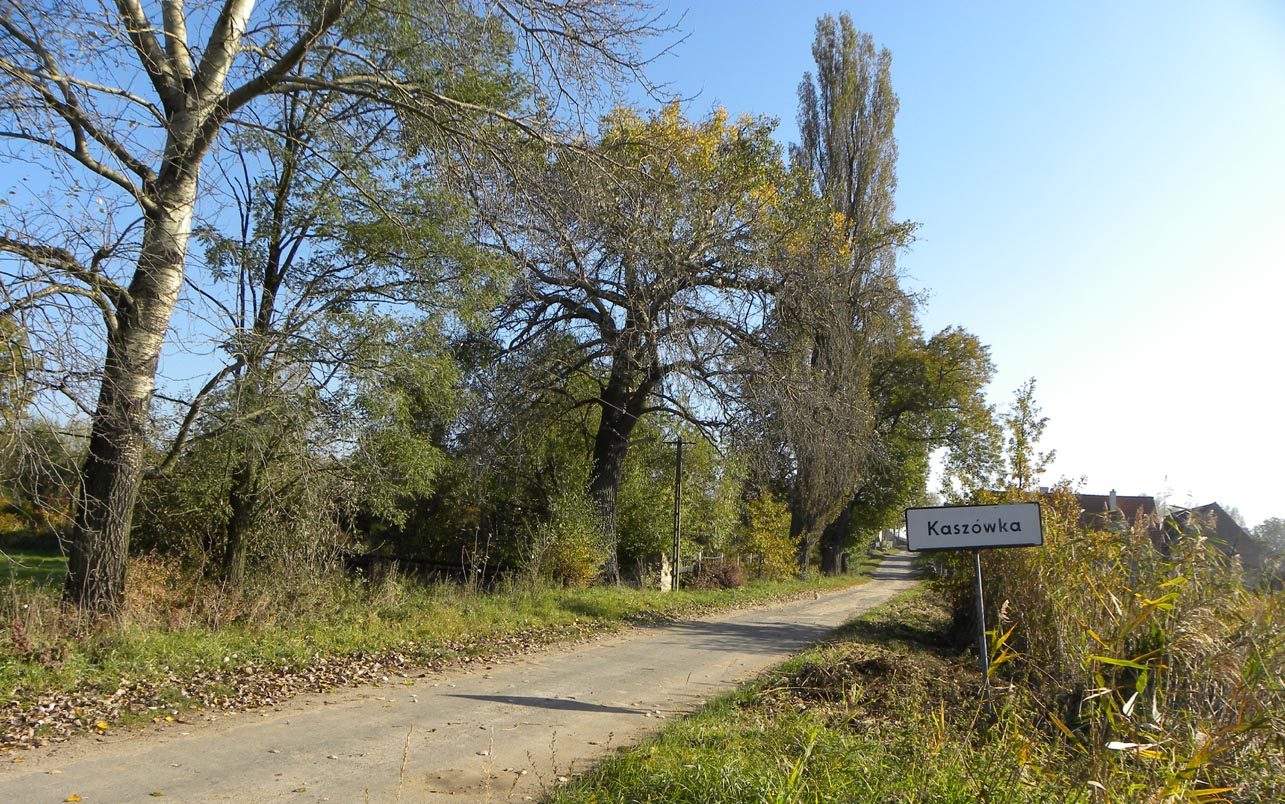

- Location within Poland
- Coordinates: 50°43′N 17°11′E
- Country: Poland
- Voivodeship: Lower Silesian
- County: Strzelin
- Gmina: Przeworno

Kaszówka [kaˈʂufka] is a village in the administrative district of Gmina Przeworno, within Strzelin County, Lower Silesian Voivodeship, in south-western Poland.
