= Płosa =

- Village
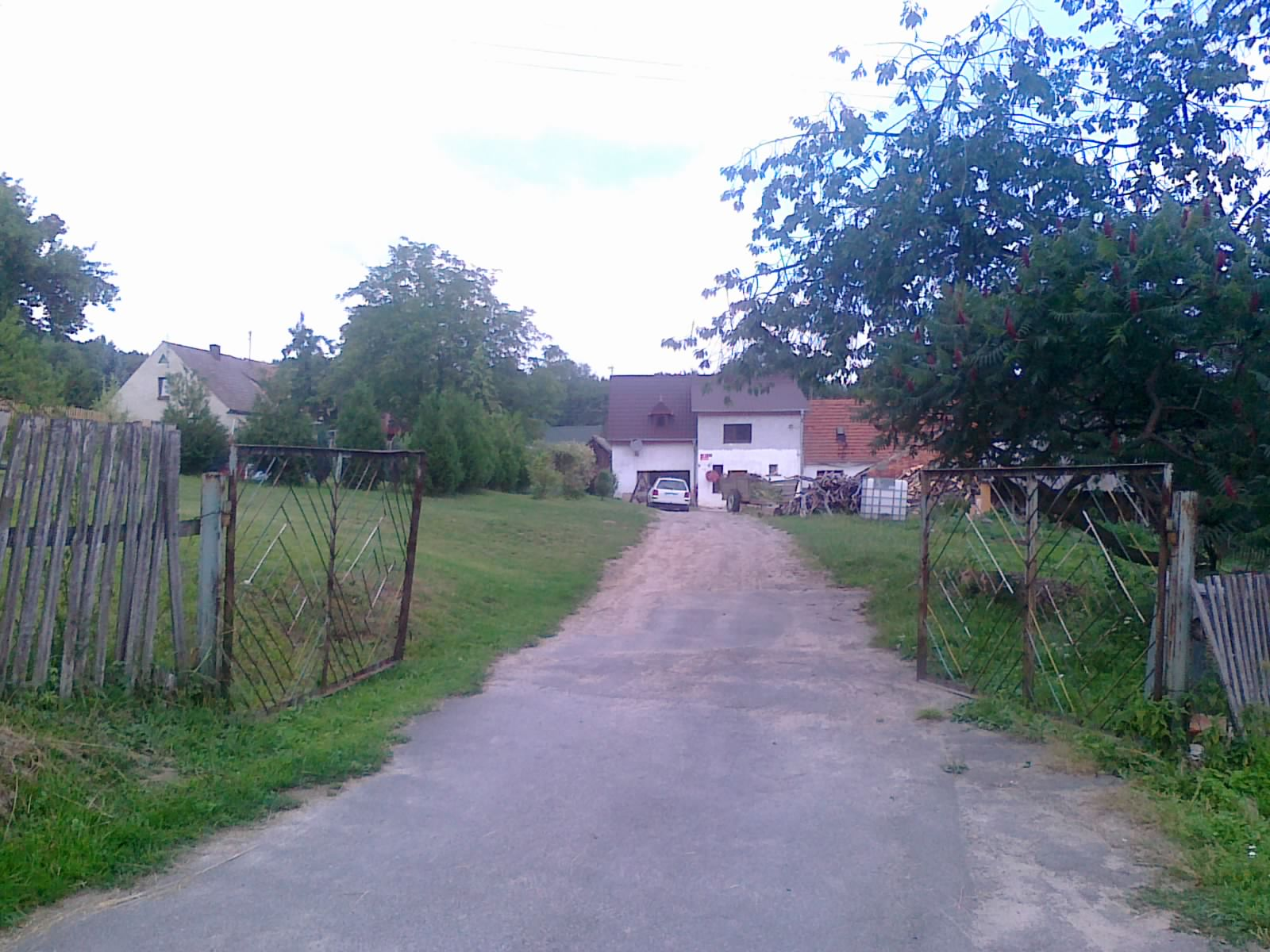

- Location within Poland
- Coordinates: 50°40′51″N 17°05′23″E
- Country: Poland
- Voivodeship: Lower Silesian
- County: Strzelin
- Gmina: Przeworno

Płosa [ˈpwɔsa] is a village in the administrative district of Gmina Przeworno, within Strzelin County, Lower Silesian Voivodeship, in south-western Poland.
