= Karłowice Wielkie =

- Village
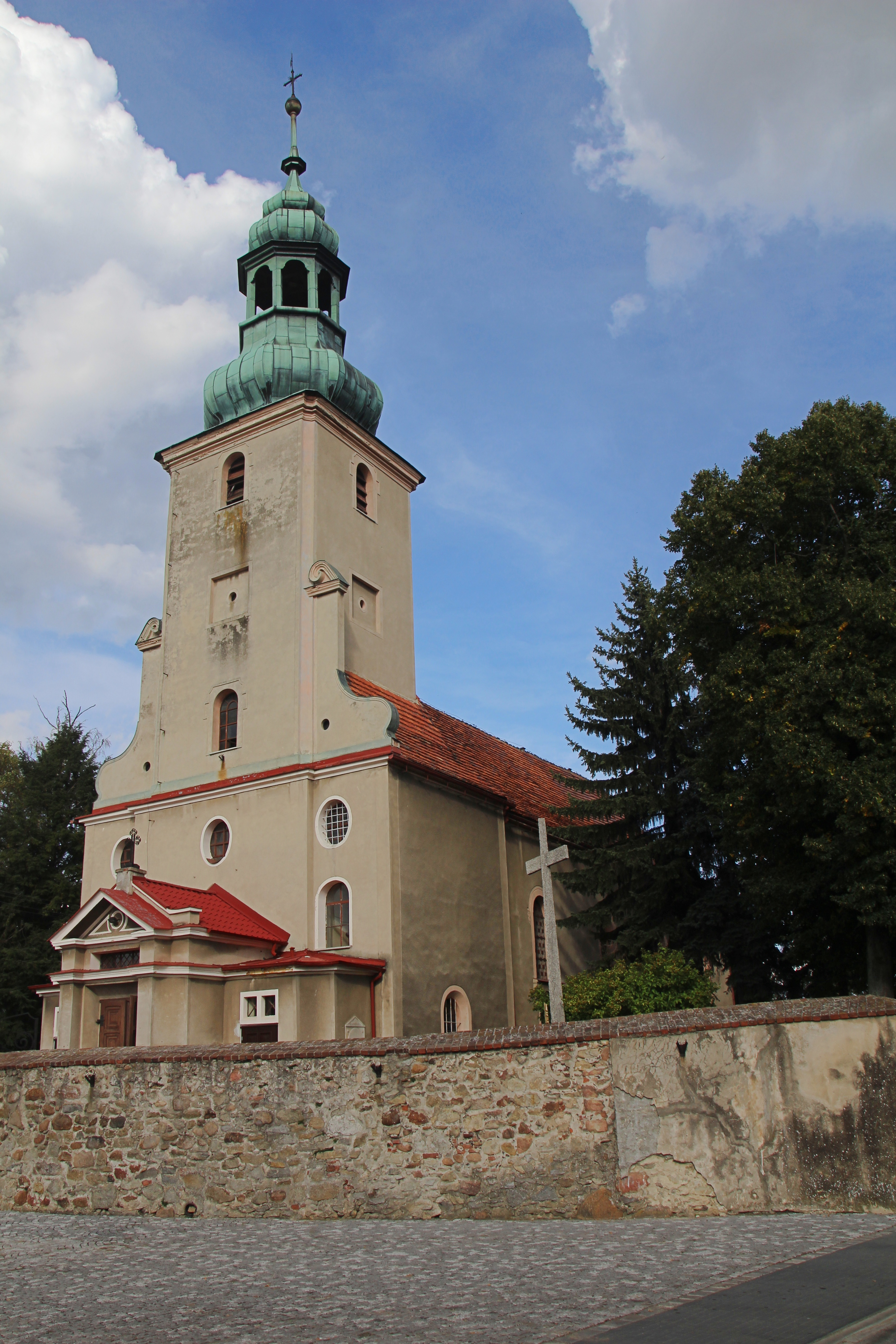
- Church of Saint Mary Magdalene

- Location within Poland
- Coordinates: 50°32′N 17°13′E
- Country: Poland
- Voivodeship: Opole
- County: Nysa
- Gmina: Kamiennik

Karłowice Wielkie [karwɔˈvit͡sɛ ˈvjɛlkʲɛ] (German: Gross Carlowitz) is a village in the administrative district of Gmina Kamiennik, within Nysa County, Opole Voivodeship, in south-western Poland.

Before 1945 the town was called Groß-Karlowitz, part of Silesia in Germany (see Territorial changes of Poland after World War II).

== Notable people ==
- Eduard von Grützner, German painter
