= Jegłowa =

- Village
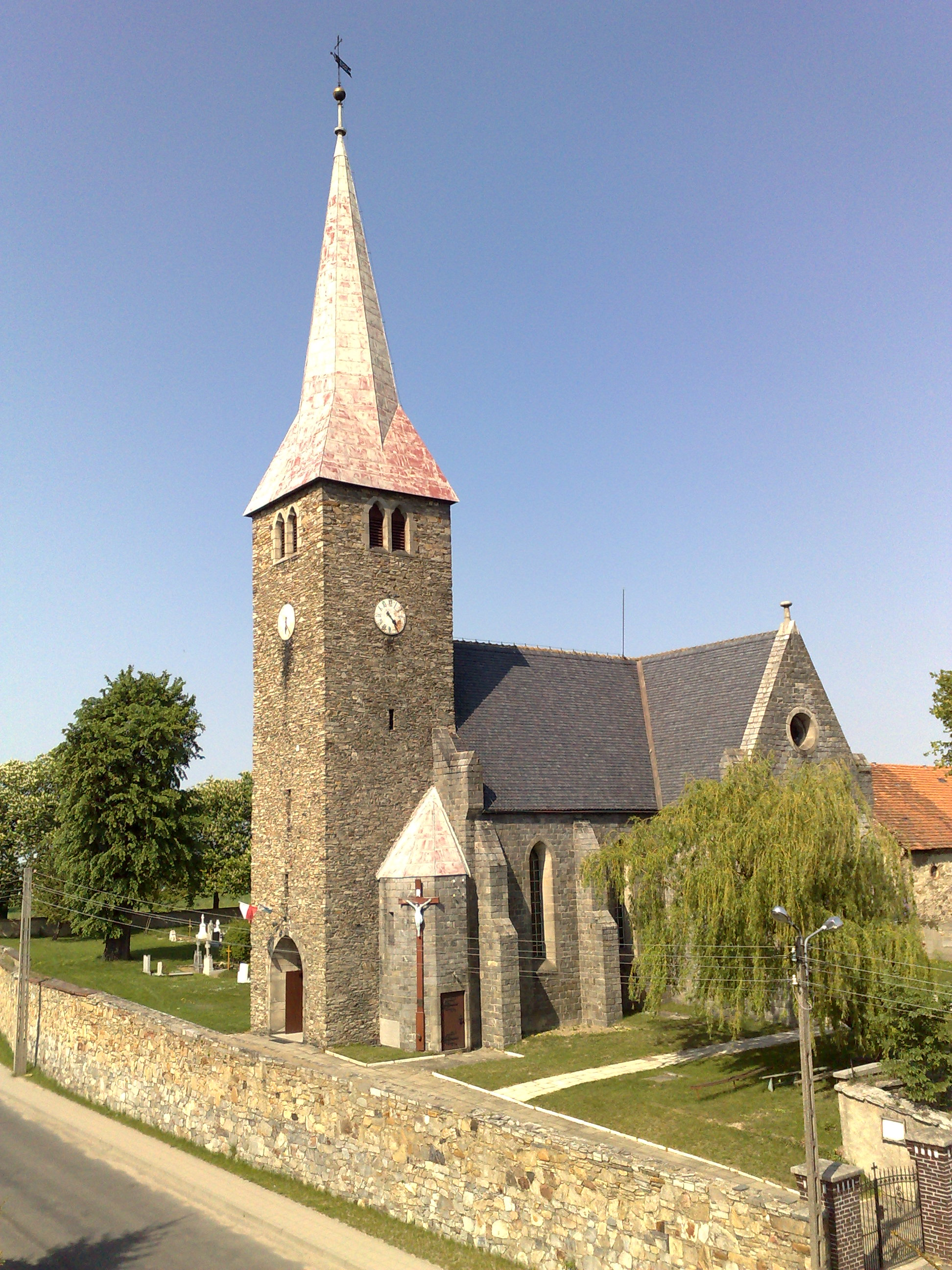
- Catholic church

- Location within Poland
- Coordinates: 50°43′53″N 17°09′23″E
- Country: Poland
- Voivodeship: Lower Silesian
- County: Strzelin
- Gmina: Przeworno
- Highest elevation: 190 m (620 ft)
- Lowest elevation: 175 m (574 ft)
- Population: 730

Jegłowa [jɛˈɡwɔva] is a village in the administrative district of Gmina Przeworno, within Strzelin County, Lower Silesian Voivodeship, in south-western Poland.
