= Siodłary =

- Village
- Location within Poland
- Coordinates: 50°31′N 17°9′E
- Country: Poland
- Voivodeship: Opole
- County: Nysa
- Gmina: Kamiennik

Siodłary [ɕɔdˈwarɨ] (German: Satteldorf) is a village in the administrative district of Gmina Kamiennik, within Nysa County, Opole Voivodeship, in south-western Poland.
