= Eduard von Grützner =

German painter and professor of art

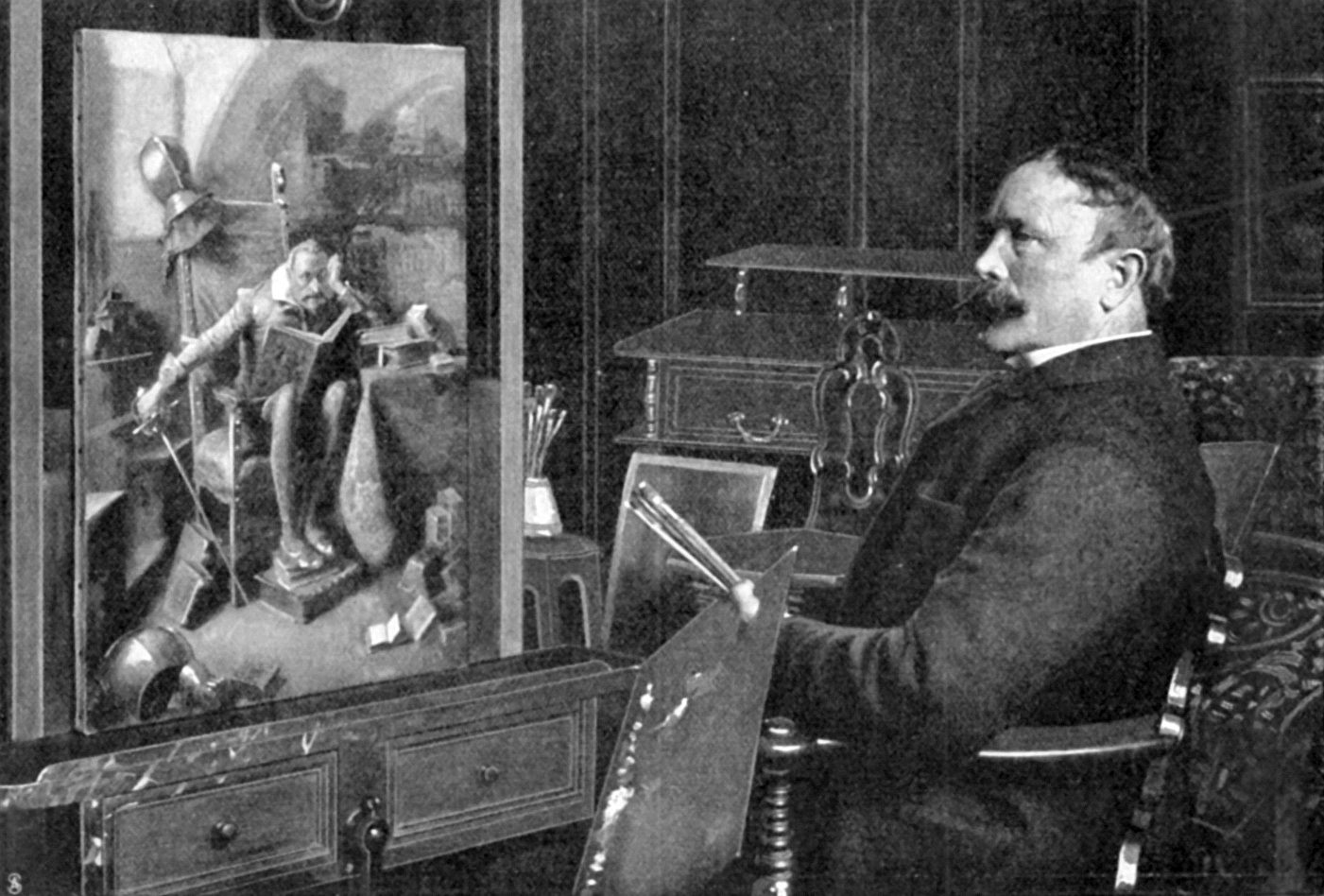
Eduard von Grützner in front of his painting Don Quixote (1904)

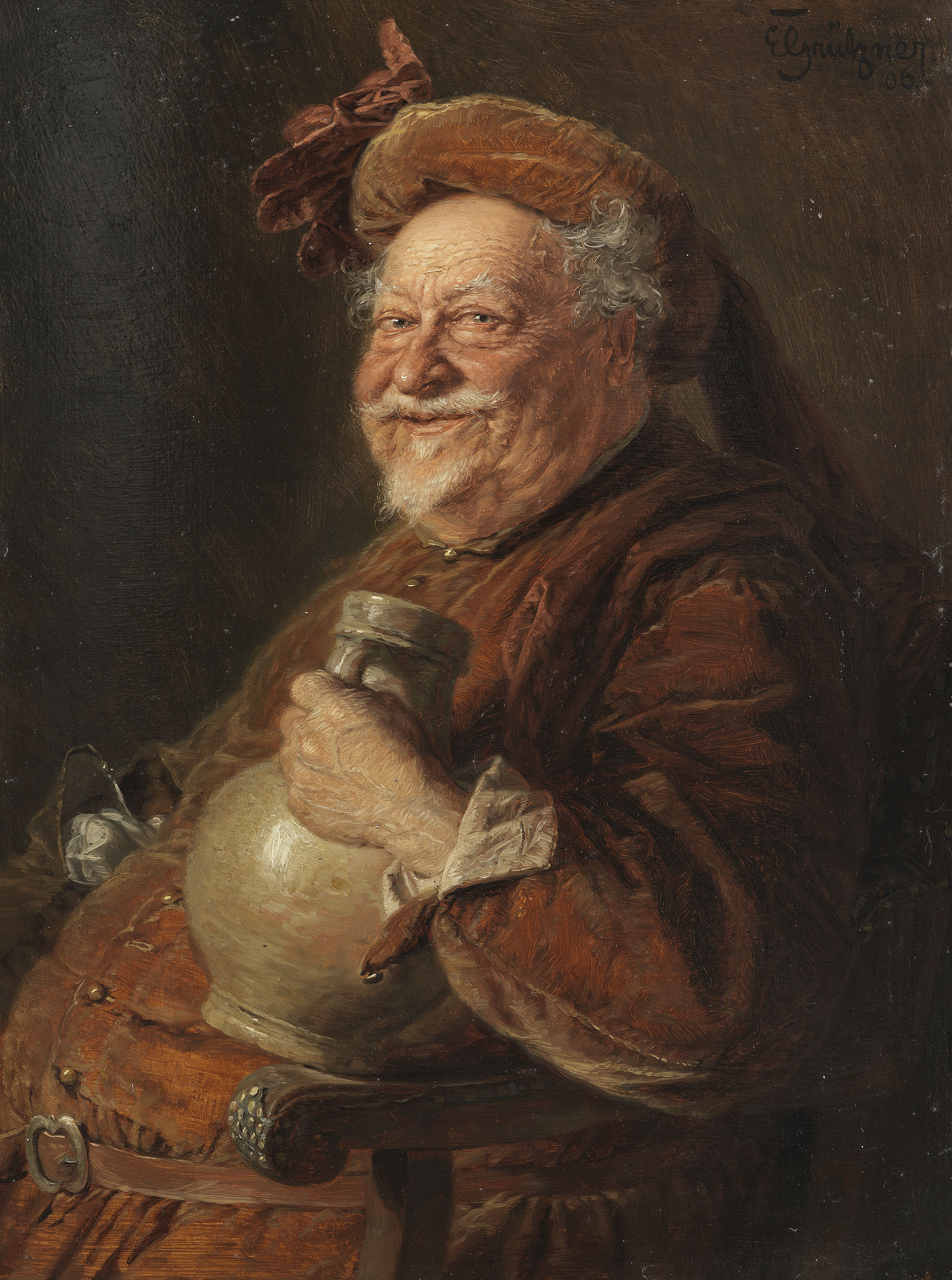
Eduard von Grützner's Falstaff (1906)

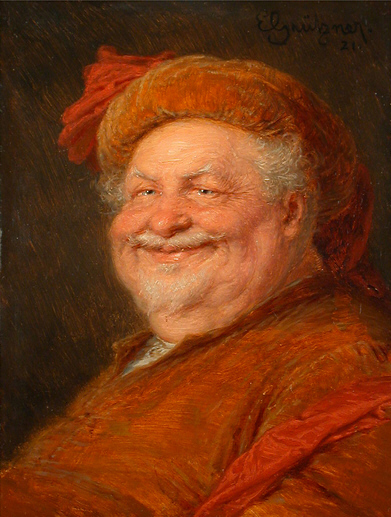
Eduard von Grützner's Falstaff (1921)

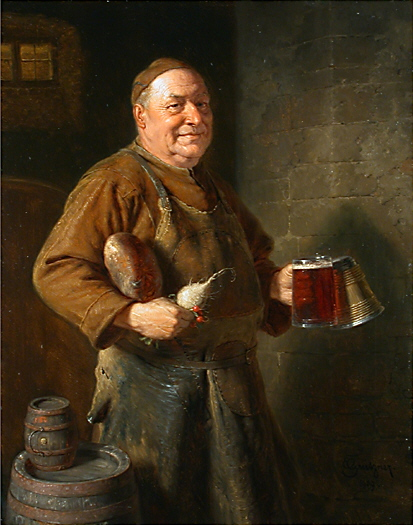
Mönch auf dem Weg zur Brotzeit, oil on canvas by Eduard von Grützner

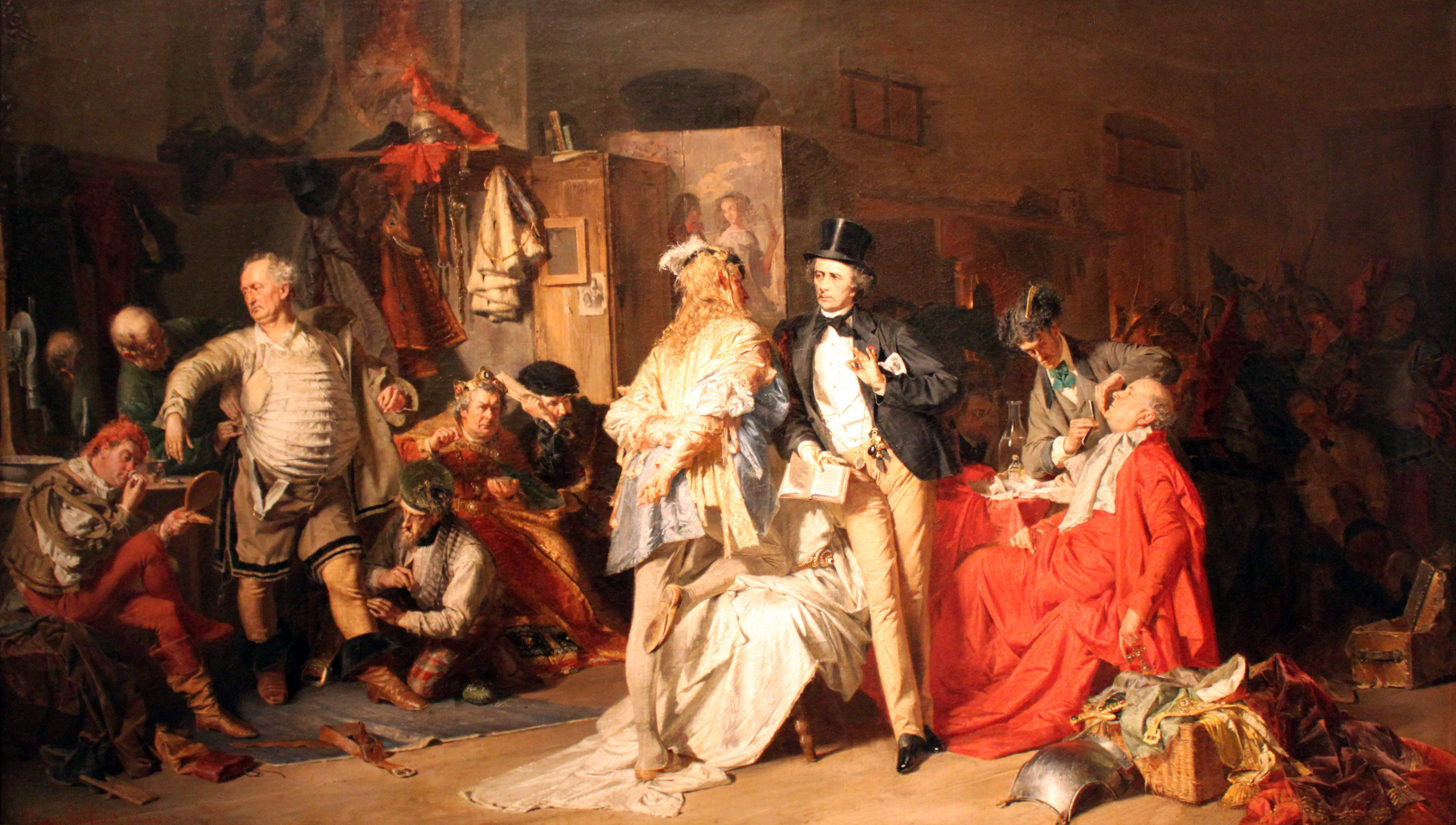
Behind the scenes, 1870, Germanisches Nationalmuseum

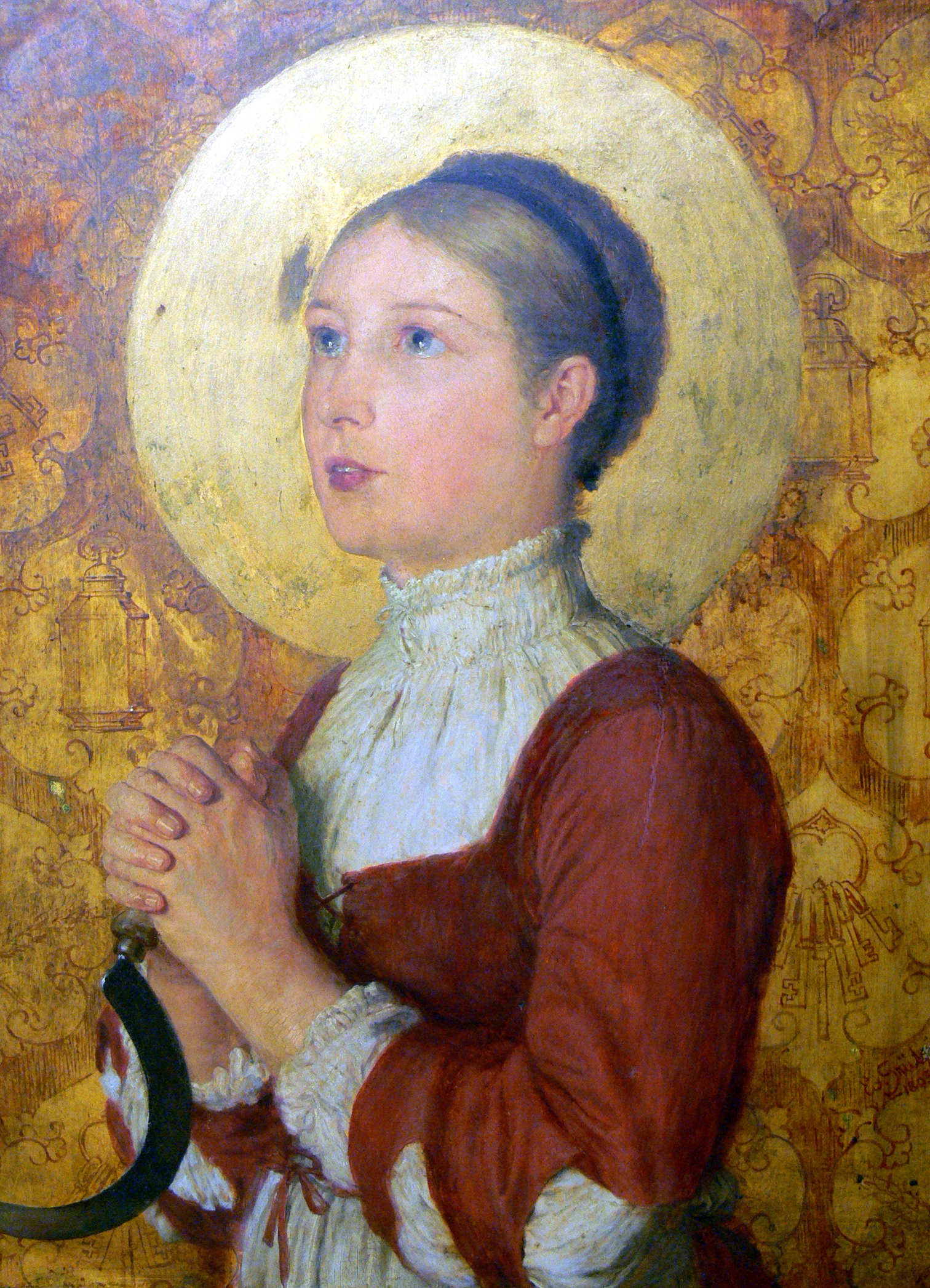
Saint Notburga

Eduard Theodor Ritter von Grützner (May 26, 1846 – April 2, 1925) was a German painter and professor of art. He was especially noted for his genre paintings of monks. He also repeatedly depicted Falstaff.

== Childhood ==
Grützner was born in 1846 into a noble family in Groß-Karlowitz near Neisse, Upper Silesia, Prussia (now Poland). His father was a prominent member of the church, and the local pastor often visited his parents' home. The pastor recognized Eduard's talent and inclination for painting early on. The manager of a ducal country house in the neighborhood got him drawing paper, and eventually the pastor gained him entrance to the Carolinum in Neisse, which was the city's Gymnasium (university preparatory school).

== Studies ==
In 1864, the pastor brought Grützner to the private school of Hermann Dyck in Munich for art education, at first in the vocational Kunstgewerbeschule under Dyck, soon transferring to the Classical Art class of Johann Georg Hiltensperger and Alexander Ströhuber, where the students learned about the aesthetic ideals of antiquity.

In 1865, Grützner joined the painting class of Hermann Anschütz at the Munich Academy. Meanwhile, he also sought advice and inspiration from Carl Theodor von Piloty, whose class he joined in 1867. Piloty's class included aspiring artists from Hungary, Greece, Germany, Russia, and Poland. After three years under Piloty, Grützner left the academy.

== Career ==
In 1870, Grützner moved into his own studio in the garden house of Schwanthalerstraße 18 in Munich. He quickly began to produce many paintings, and soon became very successful. It was reported by artist and writer Friedrich Pecht in the journal Die Kunst für Alle (Art for All) in 1886: "the painters Eduard Grützner and Ludwig Willroider were granted the title of 'professor' by Luitpold, Prince Regent of Bavaria". In 1880, he was awarded the Order of Merit of St. Michael (Knight's Cross) first class. He was knighted in 1916.

== Art collector ==
Grützner was an avid collector of art. Early on, he favored pieces from the German late Gothic and early Renaissance. In the last decade of his life, he turned from the late Middle Ages and collected art from the Far East. In his major compositions, however, he almost always included old pieces, mostly from his antique collection.

== Family ==
In 1874, Grützner married Barbara Link. Two years later, they had a daughter named Barbara. In 1884, after ten years of marriage, his first wife died. In 1888, he became engaged to Anna Grützner Wirthmann, the daughter of a Munich garrison commander, and a short time later their son Karl Eduard was born. This second marriage was less harmonious and eventually his wife, who was seventeen years younger, left him for a Viennese singer.

In his old age he sought solace in Chinese philosophy, and began to collect items from the far east and learn Japanese. Occasionally he included a Buddha figure or a Chinese vase in some of his paintings. He also painted a number of ascetic-looking cardinals, often with harsh and unsympathetic features. He died on April 2, 1925, in Munich.

== Legacy ==
Grützner was, along with Carl Spitzweg and Franz von Defregger, one of Munich's leading genre painters in the second half of the 19th century. Grützner's paintings are best known for their combination of detailed academic rendering with humorous and anecdotal subject matter.

Grützner was one of Hitler's favorite painters. Albert Speer quoted Hitler as saying that Grützner was "greatly underrated... Believe me, this Grützner will someday be worth as much as a Rembrandt. Rembrandt himself couldn't have painted that better."

== See also ==
- List of German painters
