= Jagielnica =

- Village
- Location within Poland
- Coordinates: 50°38′37″N 17°13′37″E
- Country: Poland
- Voivodeship: Lower Silesian
- County: Strzelin
- Gmina: Przeworno
- Population: 110
- Time zone: UTC+1 (CET)
  - Summer (DST): UTC+2 (CEST)
- Vehicle registration: DST

Jagielnica (Polish: [jaɡʲɛlˈɲit͡sa]) is a village in the administrative district of Gmina Przeworno, in south-western Poland. It is located within Strzelin County, Lower Silesian Voivodeship.

== History ==
The village was founded by residents of another Jagielnica (Ukrainian: Ягільниця), formerly in eastern Poland, now in western Ukraine, fleeing the onset of World War II.
