= Chociebórz =

- Village
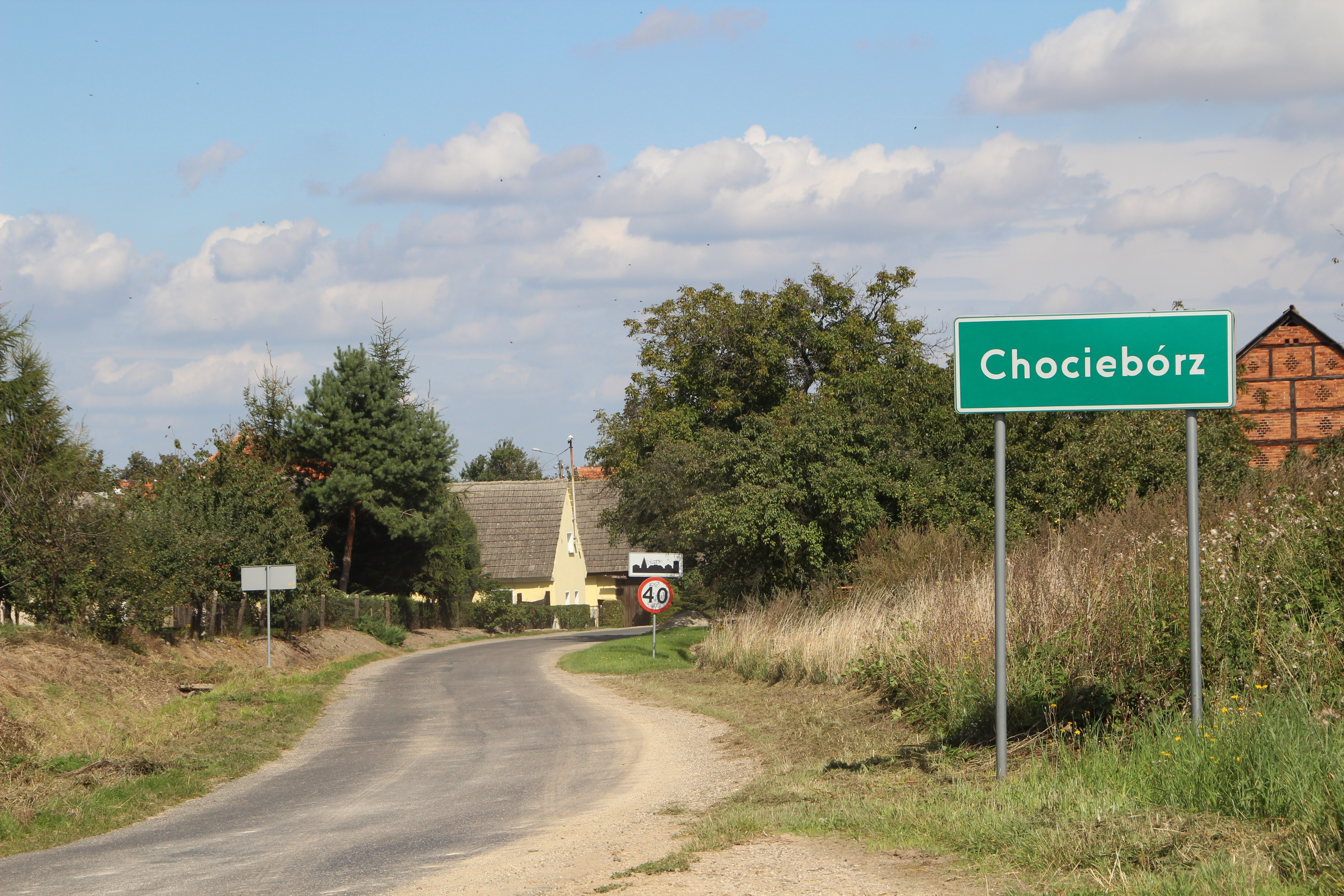
- Entering the village

- Location within Poland
- Coordinates: 50°34′N 17°7′E
- Country: Poland
- Voivodeship: Opole
- County: Nysa
- Gmina: Kamiennik

Chociebórz [xɔˈt͡ɕɛbuʂ] (German: Kosch-pendorf) is a village in the administrative district of Gmina Kamiennik, within Nysa County, Opole Voivodeship, in south-western Poland.
