= Suliszów, Opole Voivodeship =

Suliszów
- Village
- Location within Poland
- Coordinates: 50°31′30″N 17°07′38″E
- Country: Poland
- Voivodeship: Opole
- County: Nysa
- Gmina: Kamiennik

Suliszów [suˈliʂuf] (German: Tschiltsch) is a village located in the administrative district of Gmina Kamiennik, within Nysa County, Opole Voivodeship, in south-western Poland.
