= Kłodobok =

- Village
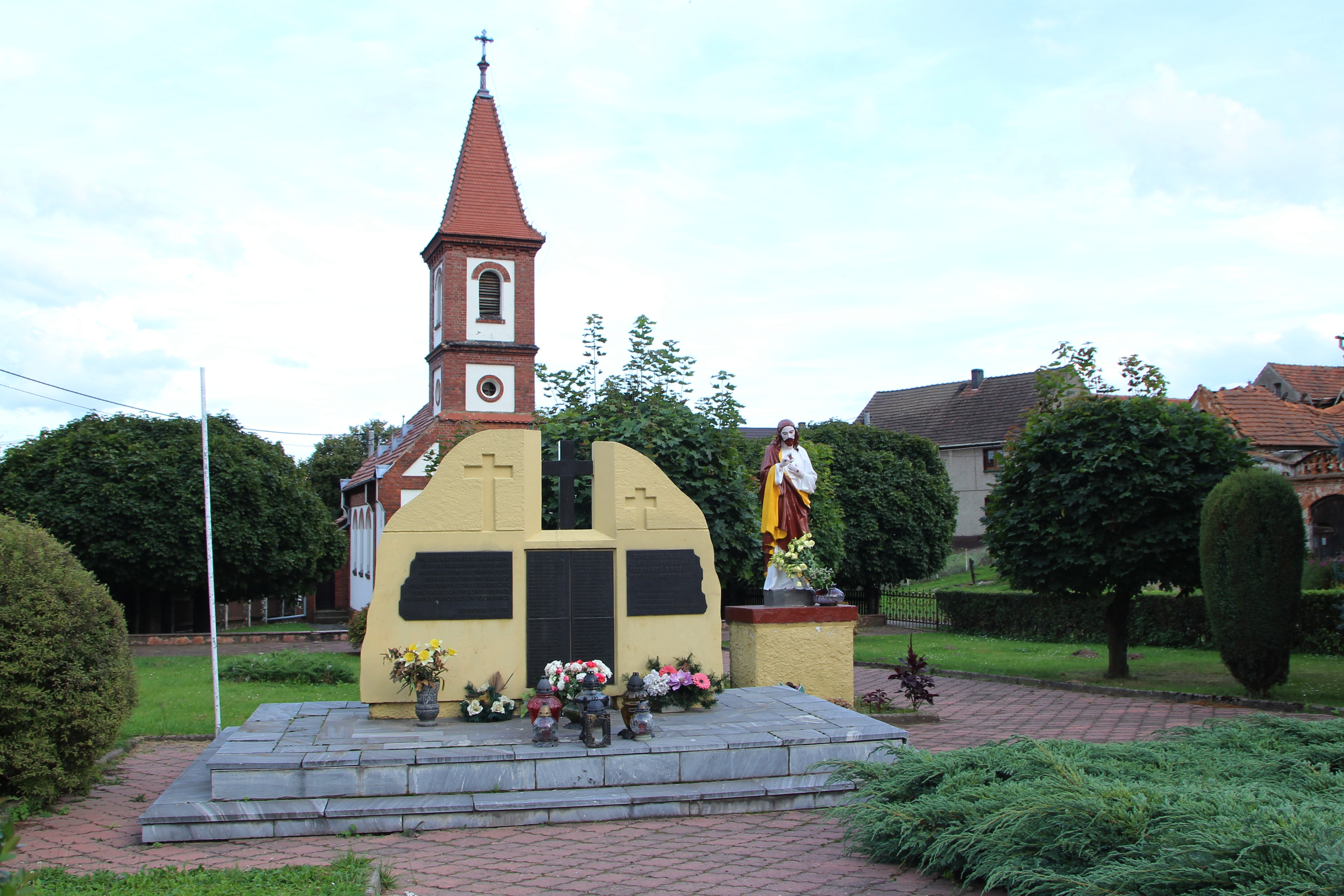

- Location within Poland
- Coordinates: 50°33′N 17°13′E
- Country: Poland
- Voivodeship: Opole
- County: Nysa
- Gmina: Kamiennik

Kłodobok [kwɔˈdɔbɔk] (German: Klodebach) is a village in the administrative district of Gmina Kamiennik, within Nysa County, Opole Voivodeship, in south-western Poland.
