= Miłocice, Strzelin County =

Miłocice
- Village
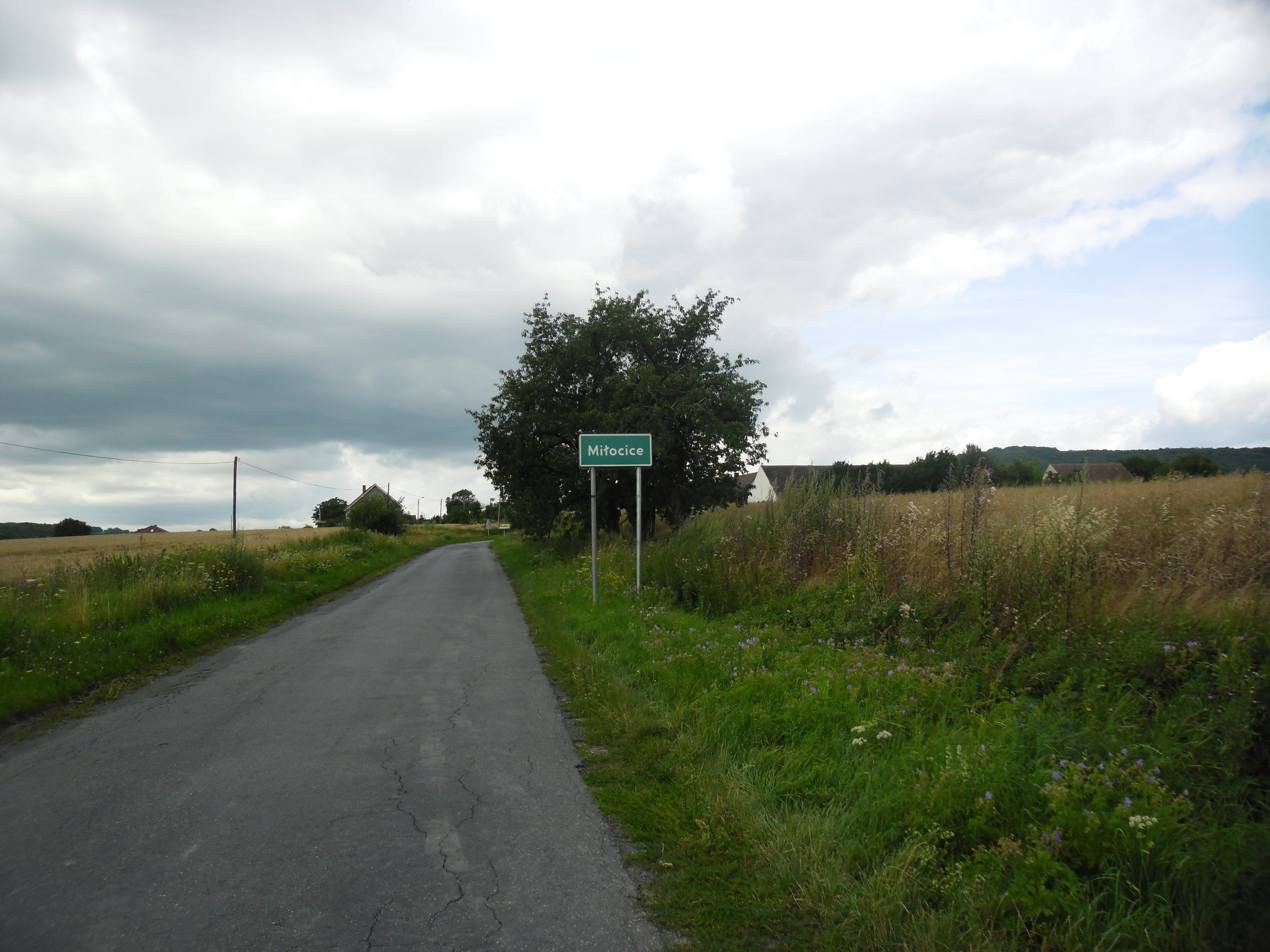

- Location within Poland
- Coordinates: 50°41′22″N 17°7′36″E
- Country: Poland
- Voivodeship: Lower Silesian
- County: Strzelin
- Gmina: Przeworno

Miłocice [miwɔˈt͡ɕit͡sɛ] is a village in the administrative district of Gmina Przeworno, within Strzelin County, Lower Silesian Voivodeship, in south-western Poland.
