= Gmina Kamiennik =

Gmina Kamiennik Kamiennik Commune
- Gmina
- Flag Coat of arms
- Interactive map of Gmina Kamiennik
- Coordinates (Kamiennik): 50°34′13″N 17°9′0″E
- Country: Poland
- Voivodeship: Opole
- County: Nysa
- Seat: Kamiennik

Area
  - Total: 91 km^{2} (35 sq mi)

Population (2019-06-30)
  - Total: 3,466
  - Density: 38/km^{2} (99/sq mi)
- Website: http://www.kamiennik.pl/

Gmina Kamiennik is a rural gmina (administrative district) in Nysa County, Opole Voivodeship, in south-western Poland. Its seat is the village of Kamiennik, which lies approximately 18 kilometres (11 mi) north-west of Nysa and 57 km (35 mi) west of the regional capital Opole.

The gmina covers an area of 91.02 square kilometres (35.1 sq mi), and as of 2019 its total population is 3,466.

== Villages ==
Gmina Kamiennik contains the villages and settlements of Białowieża, Chociebórz, Cieszanowice, Goworowice, Kamiennik, Karłowice Małe, Karłowice Wielkie, Kłodobok, Lipniki, Ogonów, Siodłary, Suliszów, Szklary, Tarnów, Wilemowice and Zurzyce.

== Neighbouring gminas ==
Gmina Kamiennik is bordered by the gminas of Grodków, Otmuchów, Pakosławice, Przeworno and Ziębice.
