= Kamiennik, Opole Voivodeship =

Kamiennik
- Village
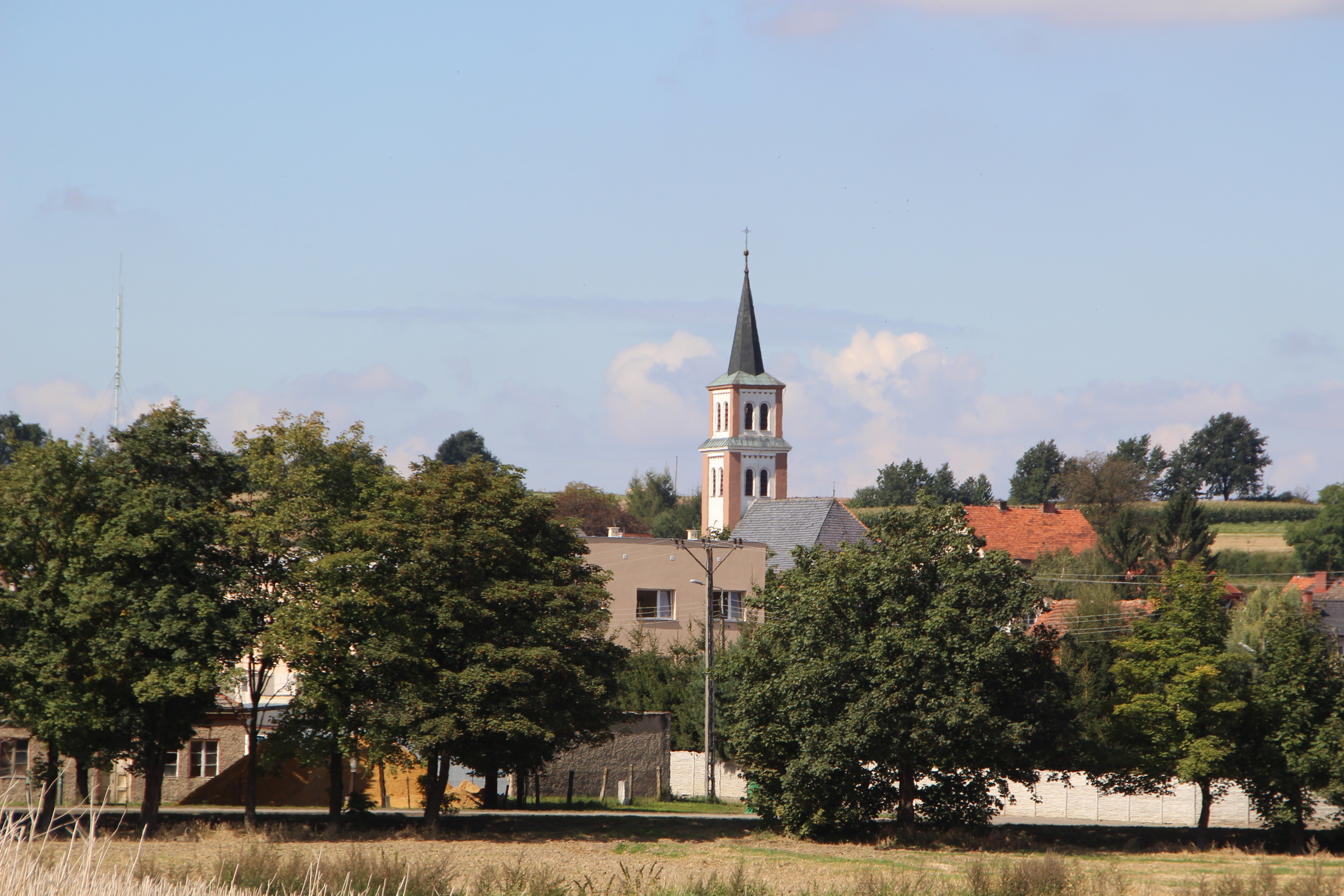
- Church of Saint Andrew

- Location within Poland
- Coordinates: 50°34′N 17°9′E
- Country: Poland
- Voivodeship: Opole
- County: Nysa
- Gmina: Kamiennik

Population
  - Total: 680

Kamiennik (Polish pronunciation: [kaˈmjɛɲːik], German: Kamnig) is a village in Nysa County, Opole Voivodeship, in south-western Poland. It is the seat of the gmina (administrative district) called Gmina Kamiennik.
