= Karnków, Lower Silesian Voivodeship =

Karnków
- Village
- Location within Poland
- Coordinates: 50°40′8″N 17°13′0″E
- Country: Poland
- Voivodeship: Lower Silesian
- County: Strzelin
- Gmina: Przeworno

Karnków [ˈkarnkuf] is a village in the administrative district of Gmina Przeworno, within Strzelin County, Lower Silesian Voivodeship, in south-western Poland.
