= Dzierzkowa =

- Village
- Location within Poland
- Coordinates: 50°41′N 17°9′E
- Country: Poland
- Voivodeship: Lower Silesian
- County: Strzelin
- Gmina: Przeworno
- Population (2011): 147
- Time zone: UTC+1 (CET)
  - Summer (DST): UTC+2 (CEST)
- Vehicle registration: DST

Dzierzkowa [d͡ʑɛʂˈkɔva] is a small village in the administrative district of Gmina Przeworno, within Strzelin County, Lower Silesian Voivodeship, in south-western Poland.

Between 1975 and 1998, it was part of Wałbrzych Voivodeship.
