= Pogroda =

- Village
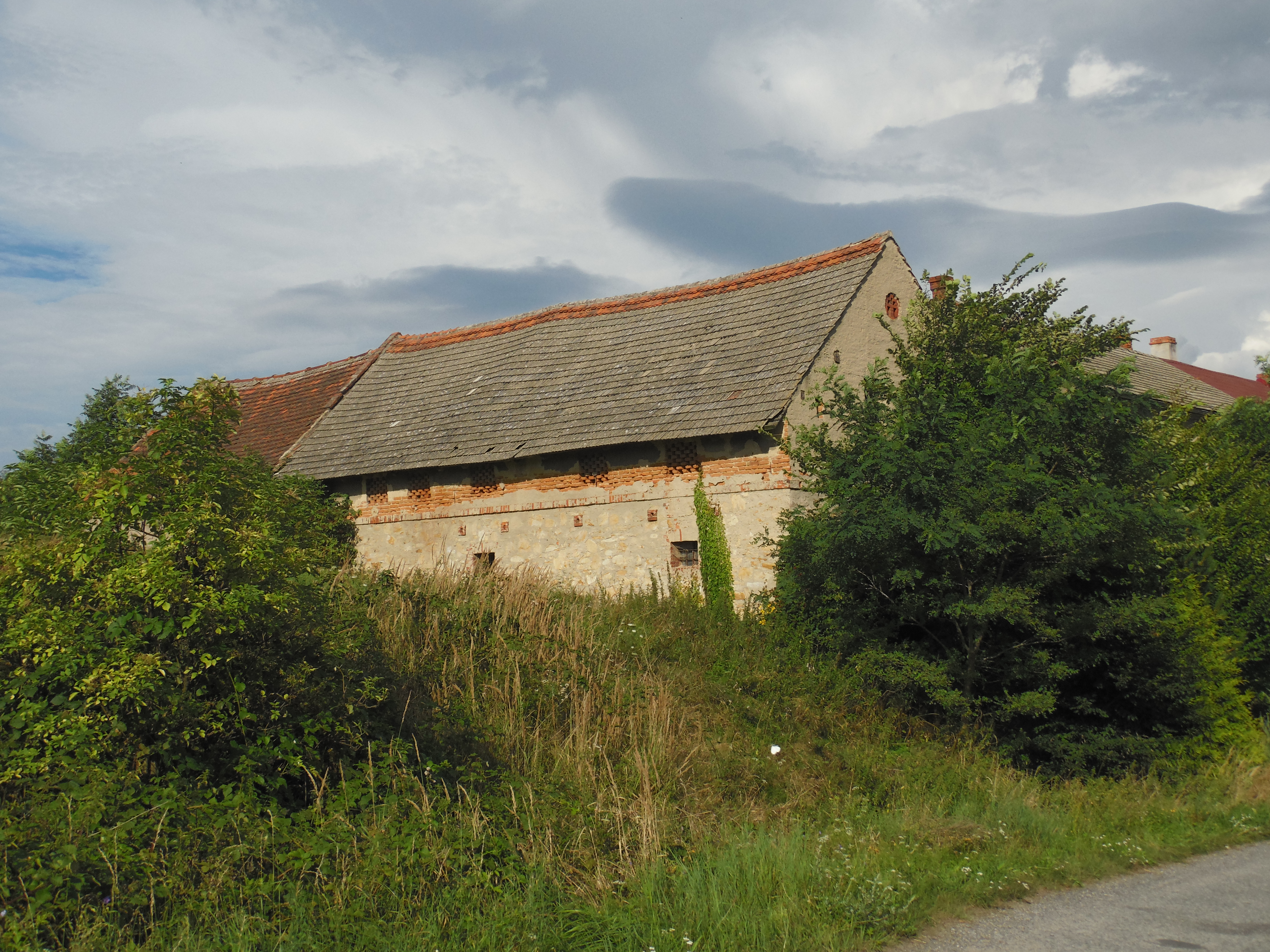

- Location within Poland
- Coordinates: 50°41′28″N 17°05′48″E
- Country: Poland
- Voivodeship: Lower Silesian
- County: Strzelin
- Gmina: Przeworno

Pogroda [pɔˈɡrɔda] is a village in the administrative district of Gmina Przeworno, within Strzelin County, Lower Silesian Voivodeship, in south-western Poland.
