= Zurzyce =

- Village
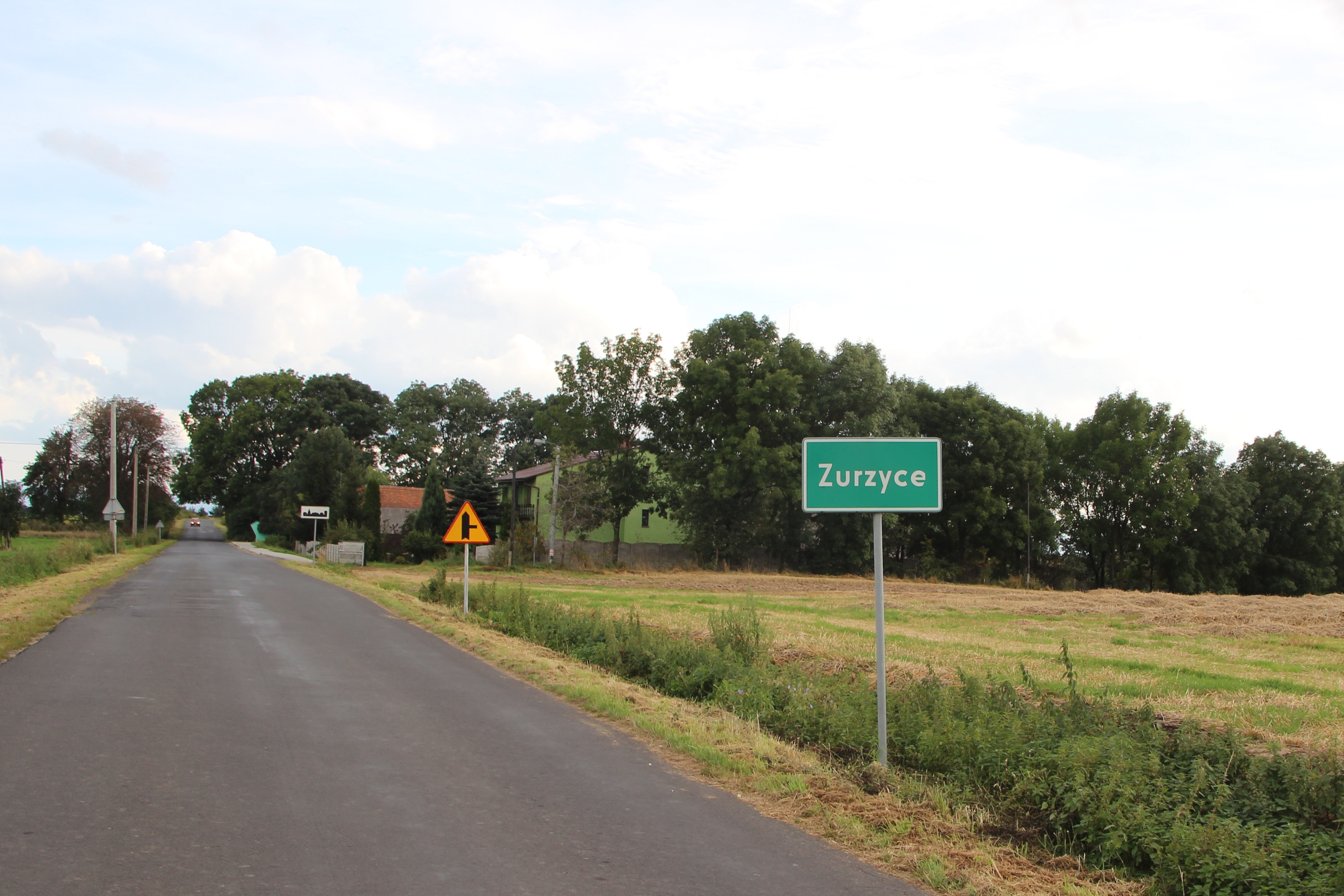

- Location within Poland
- Coordinates: 50°33′09″N 17°10′30″E
- Country: Poland
- Voivodeship: Opole
- County: Nysa
- Gmina: Kamiennik

Zurzyce [zuˈʐɨt͡sɛ] (German: Zauritz) is a village in the administrative district of Gmina Kamiennik, within Nysa County, Opole Voivodeship, in south-western Poland.
