= Samborowiczki =

- Village
- Location within Poland
- Coordinates: 50°42′N 17°9′E
- Country: Poland
- Voivodeship: Lower Silesian
- County: Strzelin
- Gmina: Przeworno
- Population: 190

Samborowiczki [sambɔrɔˈvit͡ʂki] is a village in the administrative district of Gmina Przeworno, within Strzelin County, Lower Silesian Voivodeship, in south-western Poland.
