= Białowieża, Opole Voivodeship =

Białowieża
- Village
- Location within Poland
- Coordinates: 50°31′42″N 17°9′7″E
- Country: Poland
- Voivodeship: Opole
- County: Nysa
- Gmina: Kamiennik

Białowieża [bjawɔˈvjɛʐa] (German: Pillwösche) is a village in the administrative district of Gmina Kamiennik, within Nysa County, Opole Voivodeship, in south-western Poland.
