= Konary, Strzelin County =

Konary
- Village
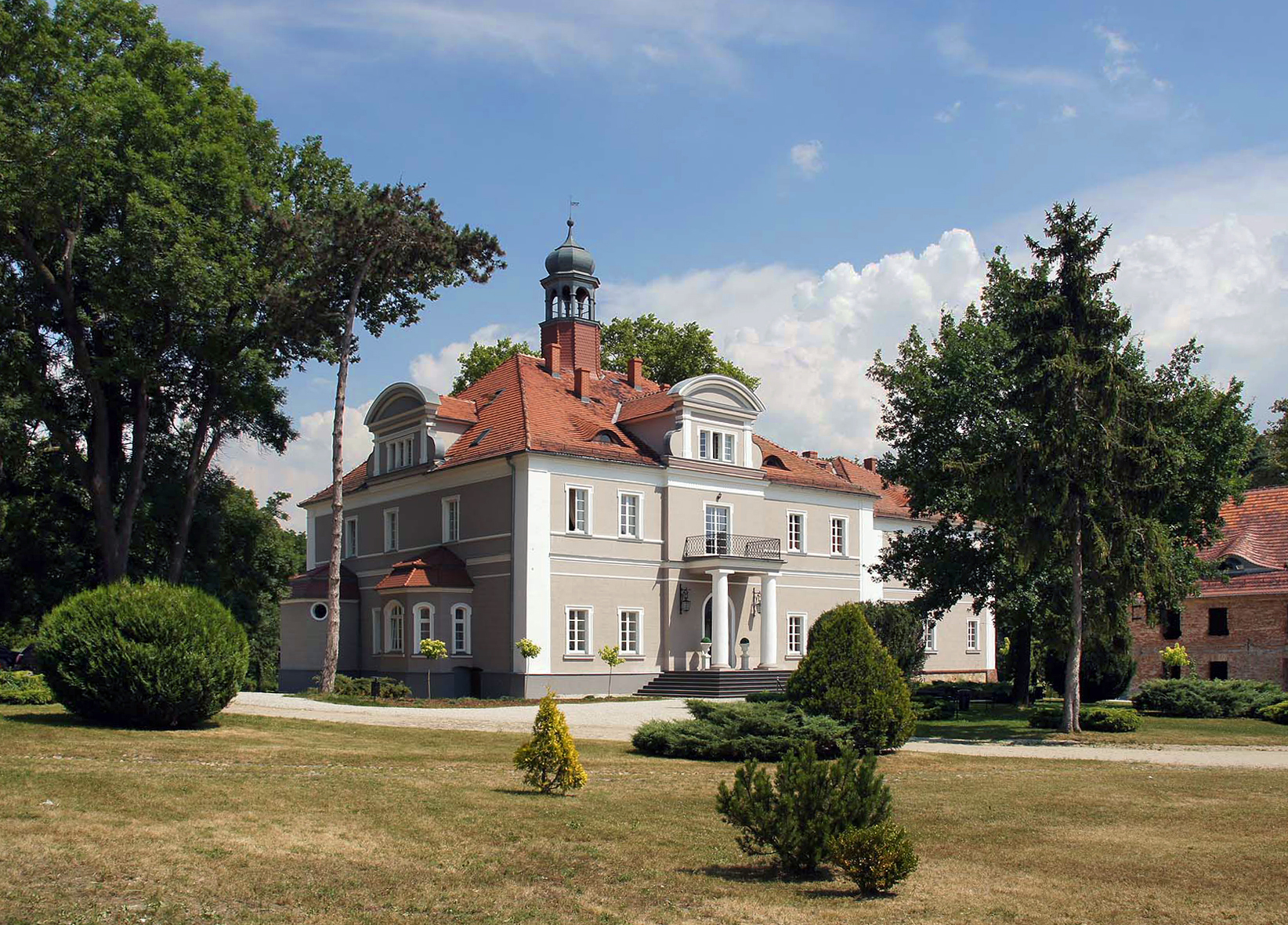
- Palace in Konary

- Location within Poland
- Coordinates: 50°39′10″N 17°09′02″E
- Country: Poland
- Voivodeship: Lower Silesian
- County: Strzelin
- Gmina: Przeworno
- Time zone: UTC+1 (CET)
  - Summer (DST): UTC+2 (CEST)
- Vehicle registration: DST

Konary [kɔˈnarɨ] is a village in the administrative district of Gmina Przeworno, within Strzelin County, Lower Silesian Voivodeship, in south-western Poland.

== See also ==
- Konary Castle
