= Tarnów, Opole Voivodeship =

Tarnów
- Village
- Location within Poland
- Coordinates: 50°32′58″N 17°08′47″E
- Country: Poland
- Voivodeship: Opole
- County: Nysa
- Gmina: Kamiennik

Tarnów [ˈtarnuf] (German: Tharnau) is a village in the administrative district of Gmina Kamiennik, within Nysa County, Opole Voivodeship, in south-western Poland.
