= Wilemowice =

- Village
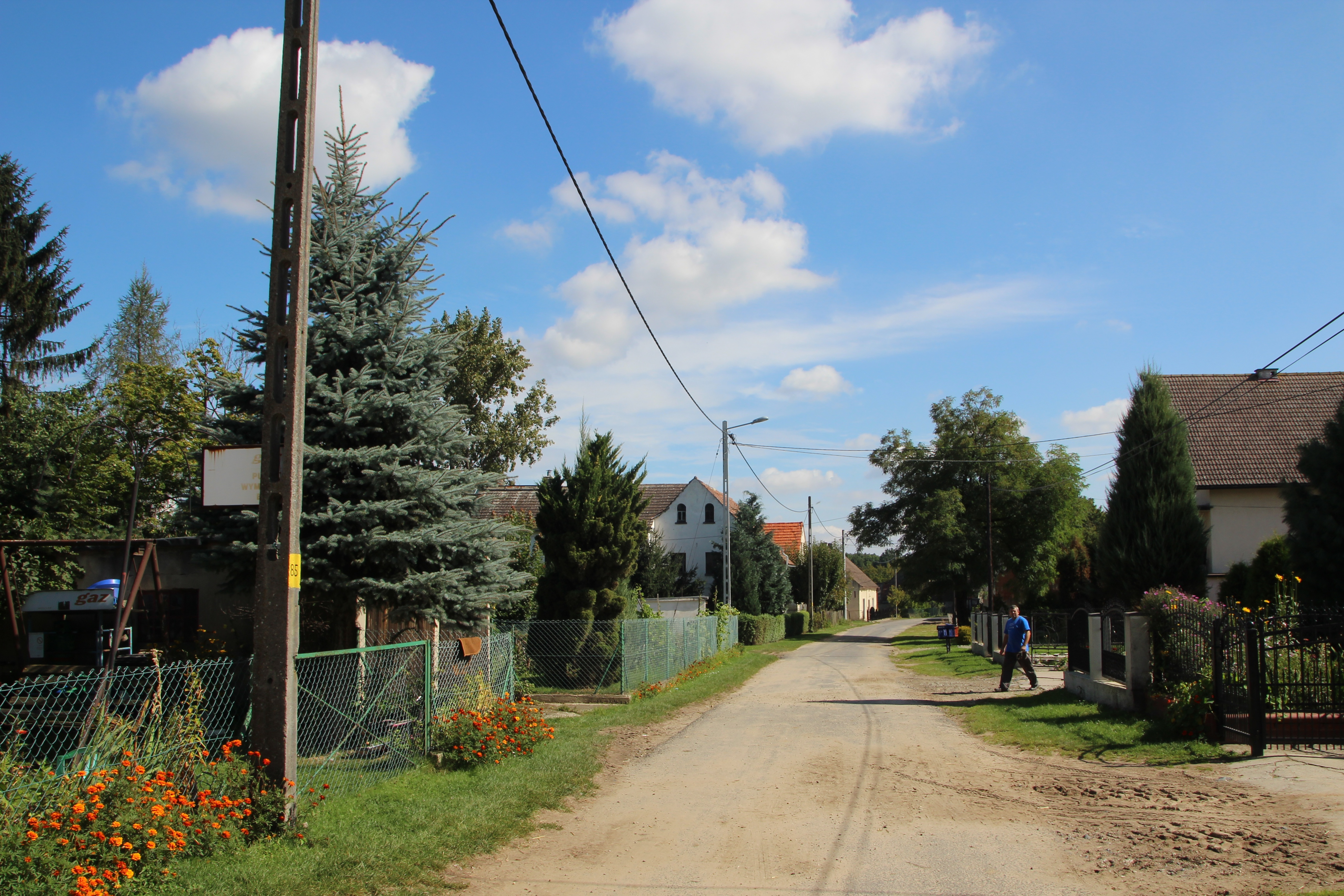

- Location within Poland
- Coordinates: 50°34′N 17°8′E
- Country: Poland
- Voivodeship: Opole
- County: Nysa
- Gmina: Kamiennik

Wilemowice [vilɛmɔˈvit͡sɛ] (German: Schützendorf) is a village in the administrative district of Gmina Kamiennik, within Nysa County, Opole Voivodeship, in south-western Poland.
