= Otmuchów railway station =

Railway station in Poland

Otmuchów
- Railway station in 2026

General information
- Location: Otmuchów, Opole Voivodeship; Poland
- Coordinates: 50°28′26.09″N 17°9′9.04″E
- Owner: Polish State Railways
- Lines: Katowice–Legnica; Otmuchów–Dziewiętlice; Otmuchów–Przeworno
- Platforms: 2
- Tracks: 3
- Train operators: PKP Intercity; Polregio

Construction
- Architectural style: Rundbogenstil

History
- Opened: 1874
- Closed: 2010 (passenger traffic)
- Former names: Ottmachau (before 1945); Odmuchów (before 1946)
Location
- Location within Poland Location within Opole Voivodeship

Otmuchów is a railway station in Otmuchów, Nysa County, within the Opole Voivodeship in southern Poland.

The railway station was opened in 1874. Between 2009 and 2010, on the railway station, no passenger traffic was operated there.

== Passenger traffic ==
In 2022, the daily passenger exchange at the station was 19 to 51 passengers.

== Infrastructure ==
The railway station is divided into 3 parts: the warehouse section, there used to be a warehouse there, but currently there are rooms with other uses (e.g., luggage storage), the passenger section: there was a waiting room, a timetable (visible), a ticket office (one or two windows, most likely only 1), and a table with a chair, which remains inside today, and the residential section: the rooms have windows barricaded from the inside. The station building is partially inhabited, the entrance is from the street side, and the apartments are only on the upper floor.

There are 3 platforms. The first, located at the station, is made of paving stones and has a wooden shelter above it, which appears to be renovated. It is a single-edged platform and is out of service, as indicated by the no-entry sign on the track along the edge. The second is the main station platform; it is an island platform, also made of paving stones, and has a well-maintained, newly painted shelter above it. Currently, it is the only platform in use. The third platform is used temporary, the access to it is across the track.
