= Cieszanowice, Opole Voivodeship =

Cieszanowice
- Village
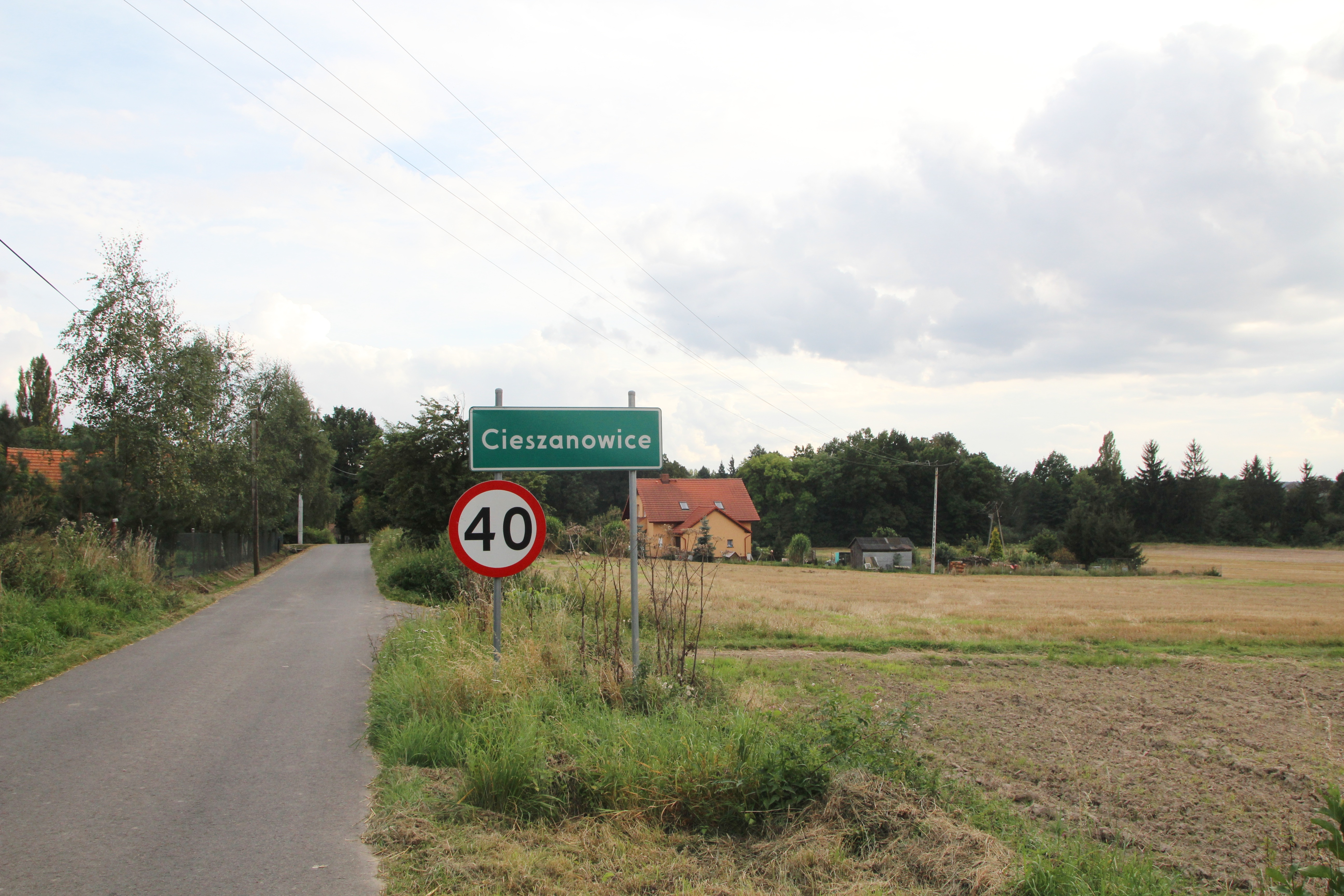

- Location within Poland
- Coordinates: 50°34′N 17°11′E
- Country: Poland
- Voivodeship: Opole
- County: Nysa
- Gmina: Kamiennik

Cieszanowice [t͡ɕɛʂanɔˈvit͡sɛ] (German: Tscheschdorf) is a village in the administrative district of Gmina Kamiennik, within Nysa County, Opole Voivodeship, in south-western Poland.
