= Szklary, Opole Voivodeship =

Szklary
- Village
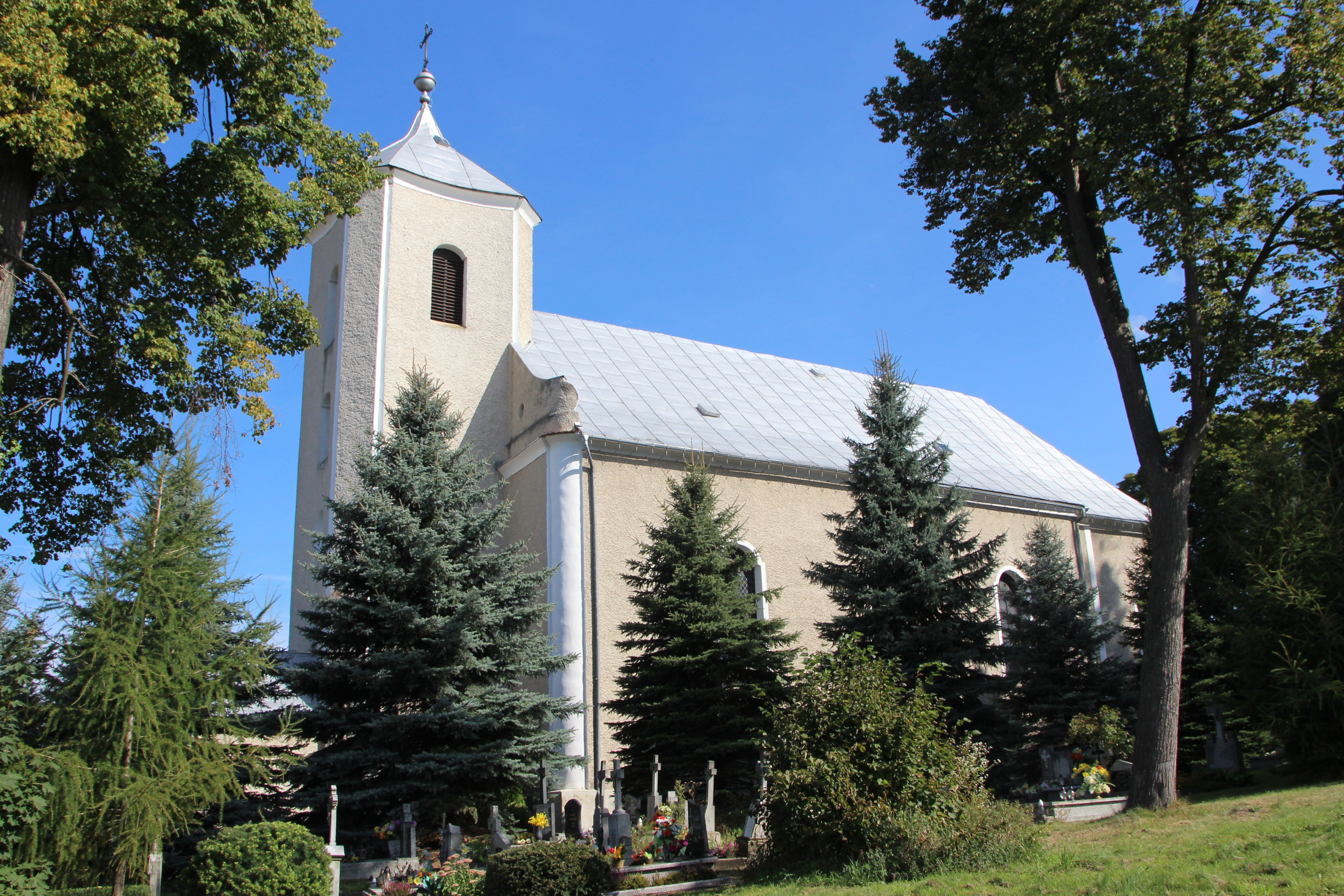

- Location within Poland
- Coordinates: 50°36′13″N 17°10′39″E
- Country: Poland
- Voivodeship: Opole
- County: Nysa
- Gmina: Kamiennik

Szklary [ˈʂklarɨ] (German: Gläsendorf) is a village in the administrative district of Gmina Kamiennik, within Nysa County, Opole Voivodeship, in south-western Poland.
