= Karłowice Małe =

- Village
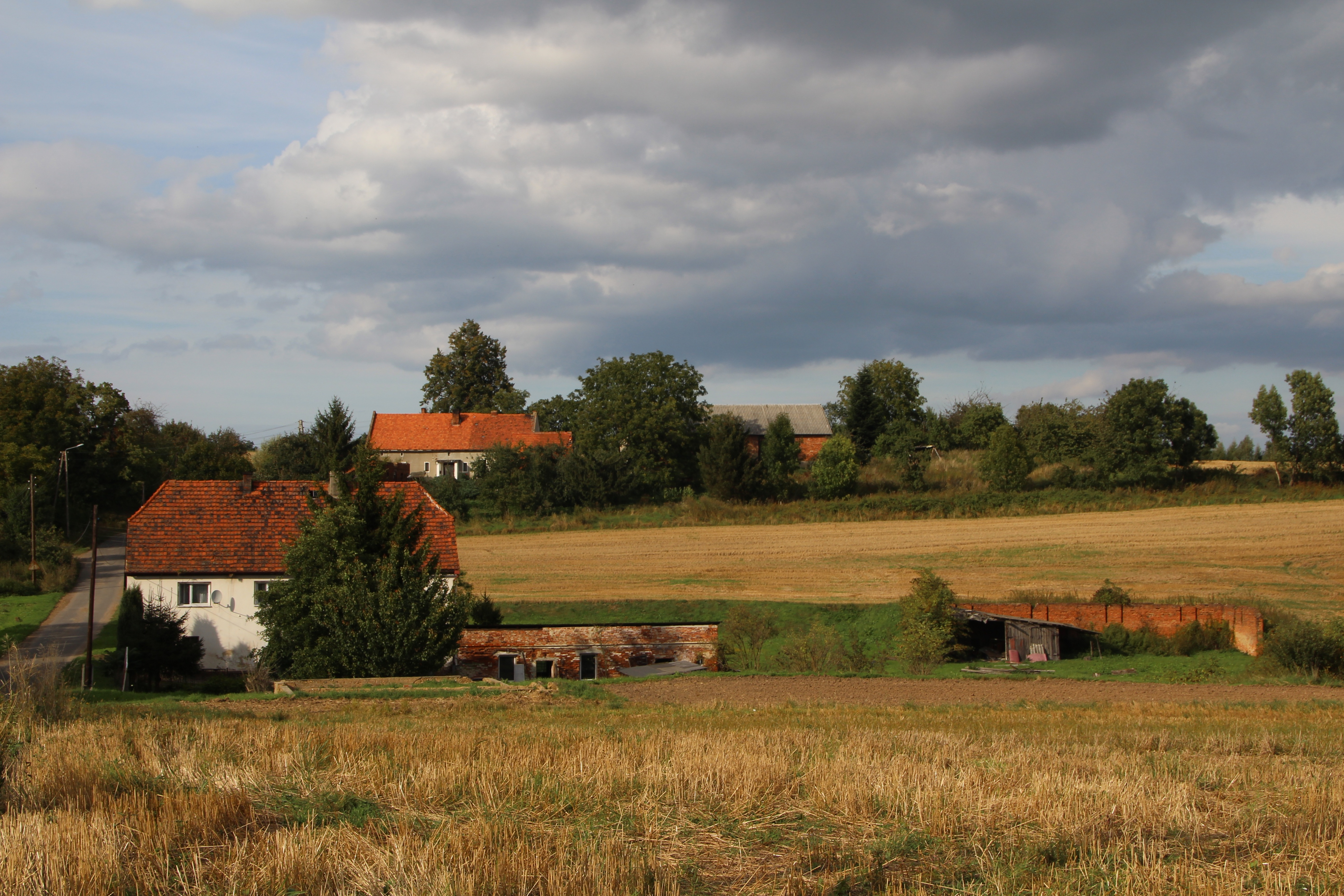

- Location within Poland
- Coordinates: 50°32′12″N 17°11′21″E
- Country: Poland
- Voivodeship: Opole
- County: Nysa
- Gmina: Kamiennik

Karłowice Małe [karwɔˈvit͡sɛ ˈmawɛ] (German: Klein Carlowitz) is a village in the administrative district of Gmina Kamiennik, within Nysa County, Opole Voivodeship, in south-western Poland.
