= Przeworno =

- Village
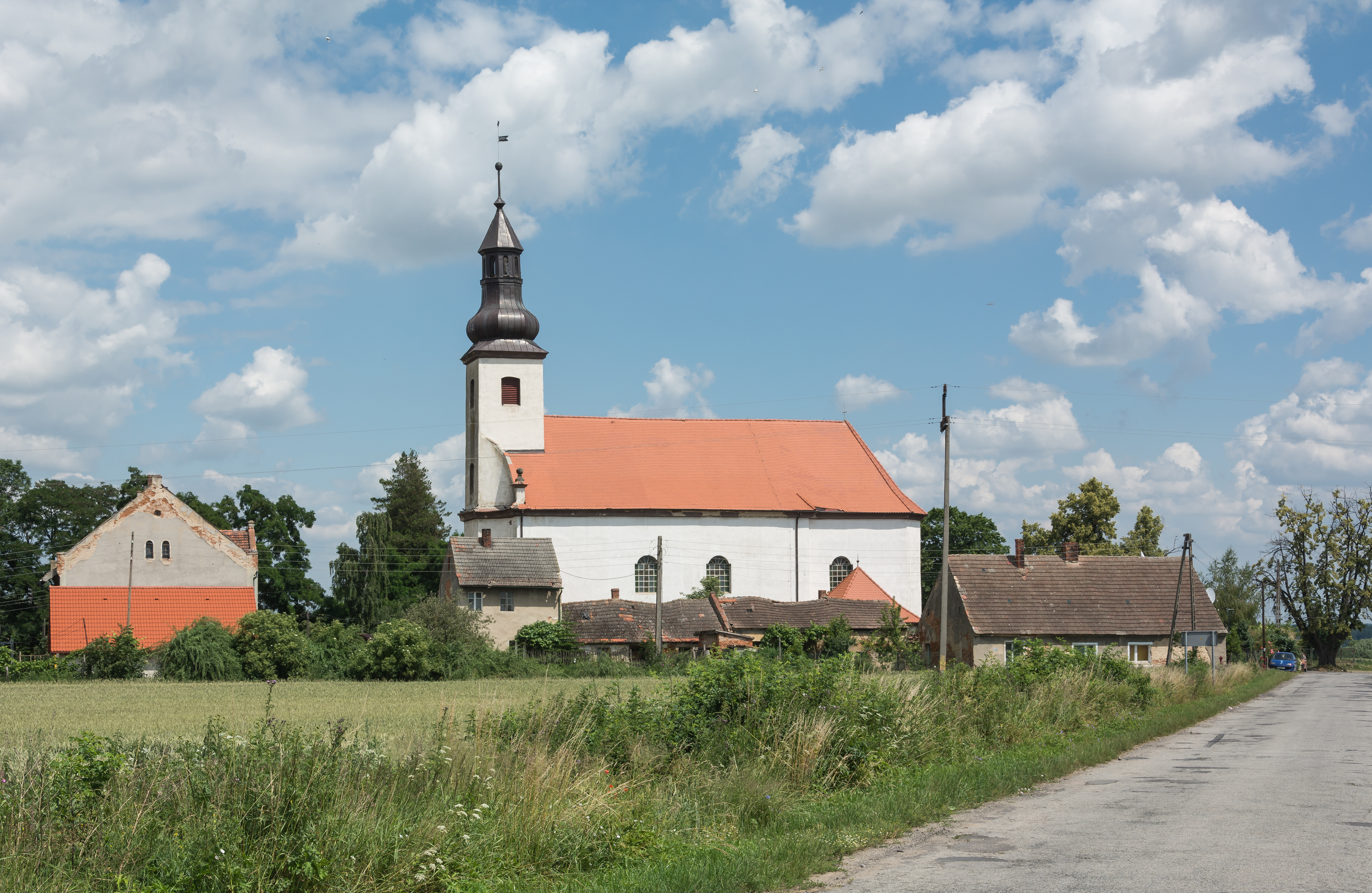
- Church of the Holy Trinity

- Coat of arms

- Location within Poland
- Coordinates: 50°41′N 17°10′E
- Country: Poland
- Voivodeship: Lower Silesian
- County: Strzelin
- Gmina: Przeworno

Population
  - Total: 1,259
- Website: www.przeworno.pl

Przeworno (Polish: [pʂɛˈvɔrnɔ]) is a village in Strzelin County, Lower Silesian Voivodeship, in south-western Poland. It is the seat of the administrative district (gmina) called Gmina Przeworno.

== Notable residents ==
- Max Drischner, German organist and composer
- Friedrich-Wilhelm von Loeper (1888–1983), Wehrmacht general
