= Stanica, Lower Silesian Voivodeship =

Stanica
- Village
- Location within Poland
- Coordinates: 50°38′30″N 17°09′55″E
- Country: Poland
- Voivodeship: Lower Silesian
- County: Strzelin
- Gmina: Przeworno
- Time zone: UTC+1 (CET)
  - Summer (DST): UTC+2 (CEST)
- Vehicle registration: DST

Stanica [staˈnit͡sa] is a village in the administrative district of Gmina Przeworno, within Strzelin County, Lower Silesian Voivodeship, in south-western Poland.
