= Gawrony =

Gawrony (German: Gaffron) may refer to the following places in Poland:

- Gawrony, Lower Silesian Voivodeship (south-west Poland)
- Gawrony, Łęczyca County in Łódź Voivodeship (central Poland)
- Gawrony, Opoczno County in Łódź Voivodeship (central Poland)
- Gawrony, Greater Poland Voivodeship (west-central Poland)
- Gawrony, Śrem County in Greater Poland Voivodeship (west-central Poland)
