= Ogonów, Opole Voivodeship =

Ogonów
- Village
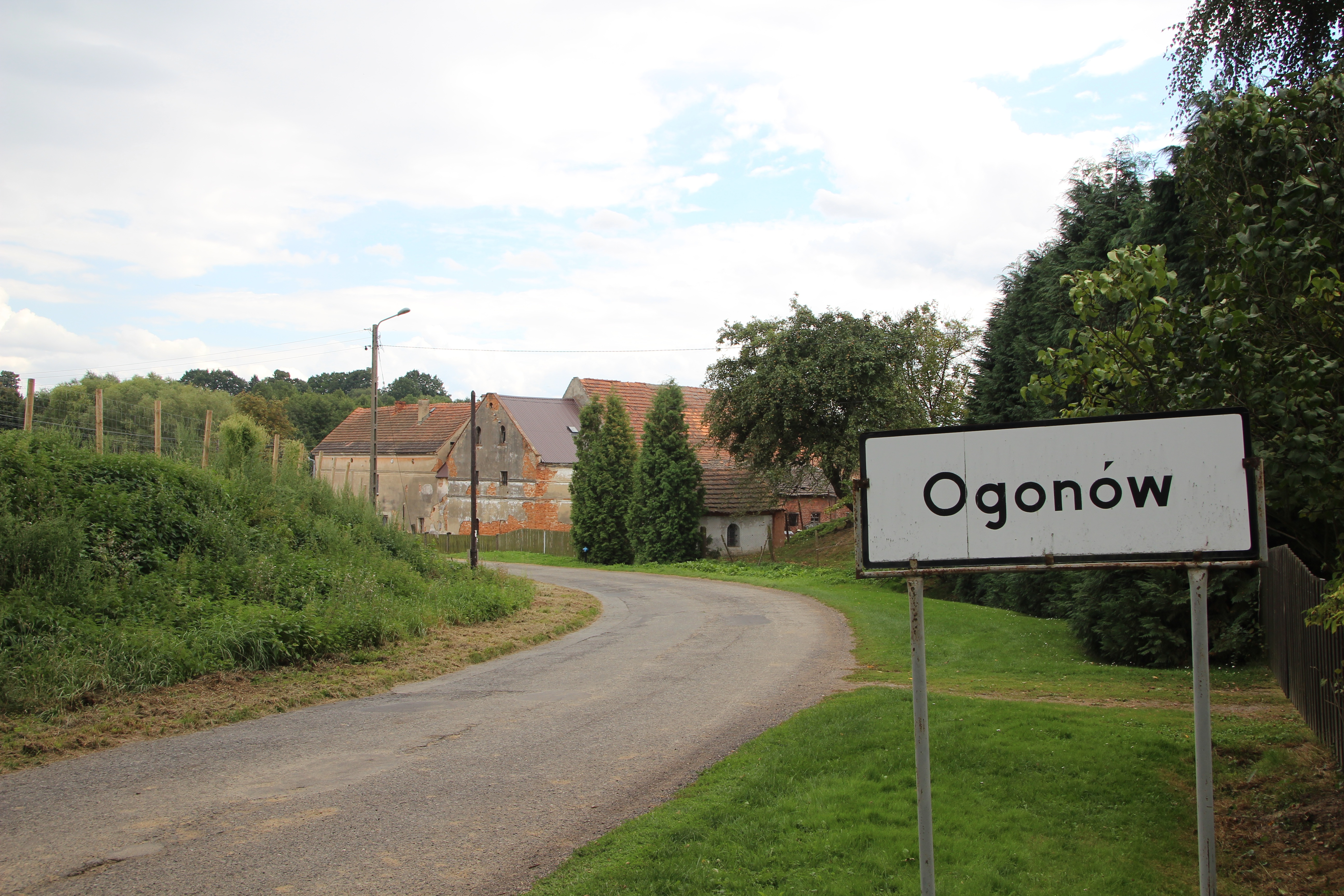

- Location within Poland
- Coordinates: 50°32′N 17°11′E
- Country: Poland
- Voivodeship: Opole
- County: Nysa
- Gmina: Kamiennik

Ogonów [ɔˈɡɔnuf] (German: Ogen) is a village in the administrative district of Gmina Kamiennik, within Nysa County, Opole Voivodeship, in south-western Poland.
