= Strużyna, Lower Silesian Voivodeship =

Strużyna
- Village
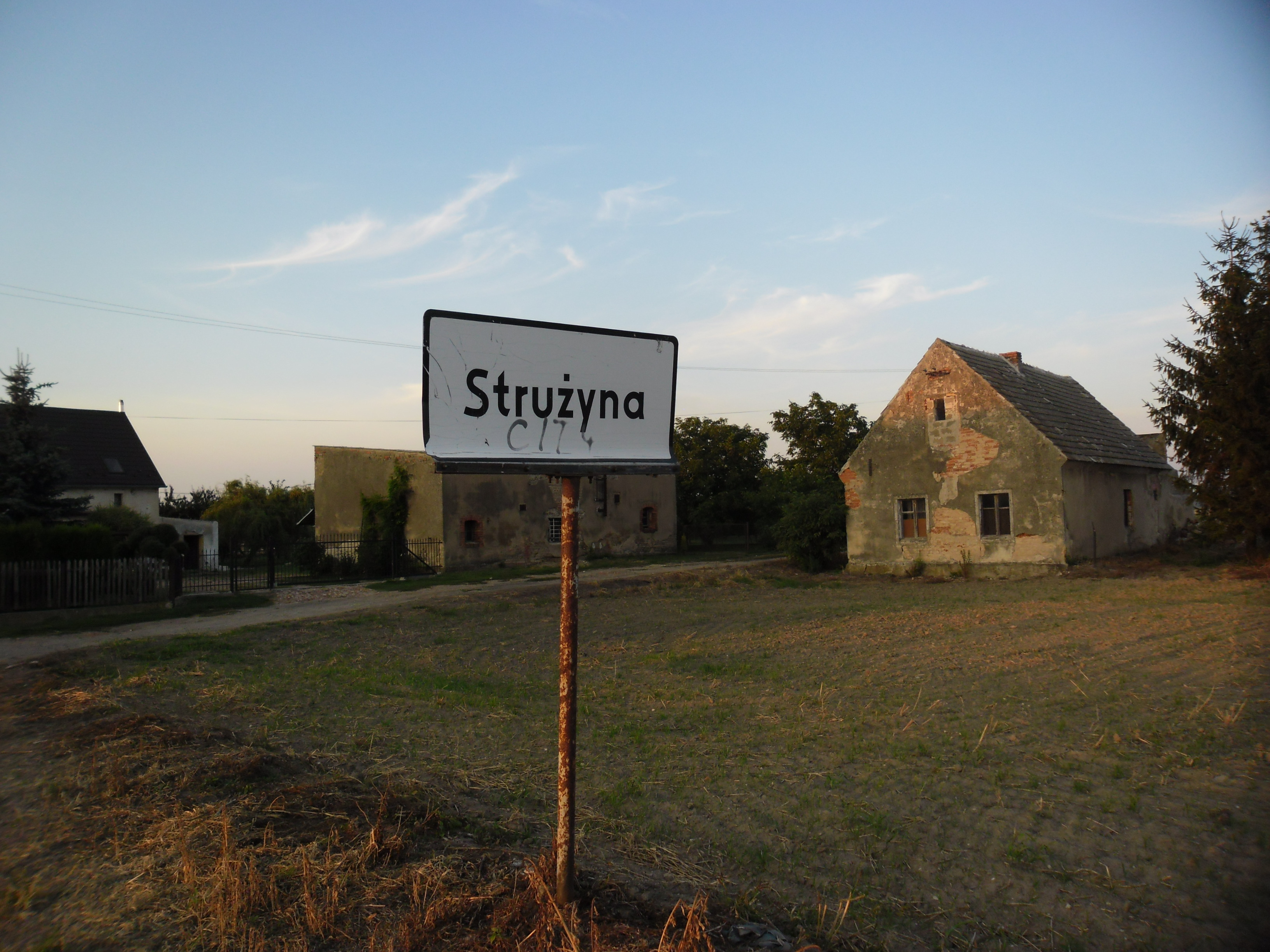

- Location within Poland
- Coordinates: 50°42′14″N 17°11′11″E
- Country: Poland
- Voivodeship: Lower Silesian
- County: Strzelin
- Gmina: Przeworno

Strużyna [struˈʐɨna] is a village in the administrative district of Gmina Przeworno, within Strzelin County, Lower Silesian Voivodeship, in south-western Poland.
