= Wieliczna, Lower Silesian Voivodeship =

Wieliczka
- Village
- Location within Poland
- Coordinates: 50°40′N 17°15′E
- Country: Poland
- Voivodeship: Lower Silesian
- County: Strzelin
- Gmina: Przeworno

Wieliczka [vjɛˈlit͡ʂna] is a village in the administrative district of Gmina Przeworno, within Strzelin County, Lower Silesian Voivodeship, in south-western Poland.
