= Cierpice, Lower Silesian Voivodeship =

Cierpice
- Village
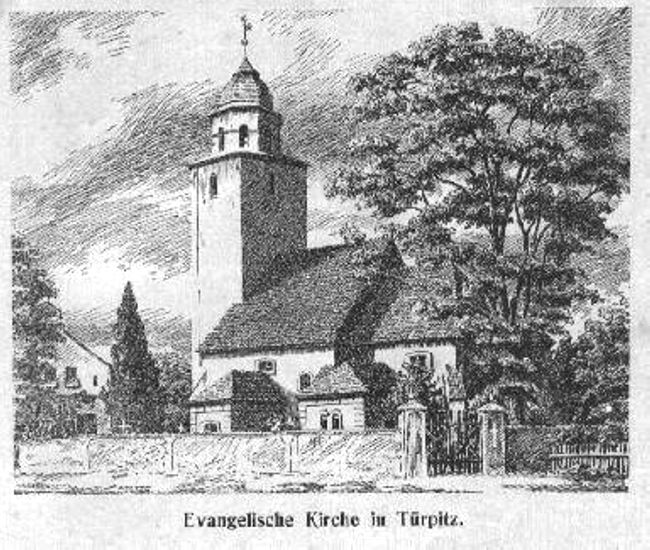

- Location within Poland
- Coordinates: 50°40′13″N 17°09′56″E
- Country: Poland
- Voivodeship: Lower Silesian
- County: Strzelin
- Gmina: Przeworno

Cierpice [t͡ɕɛrˈpit͡sɛ] is a village in the administrative district of Gmina Przeworno, within Strzelin County, Lower Silesian Voivodeship, in south-western Poland.
