= Jagielno, Lower Silesian Voivodeship =

Jagielno
- Village
- Location within Poland
- Coordinates: 50°38′01″N 17°12′16″E
- Country: Poland
- Voivodeship: Lower Silesian
- County: Strzelin
- Gmina: Przeworno

Jagielno (Polish: [jaˈɡʲɛlnɔ]) is a village in the administrative district of Gmina Przeworno, within Strzelin County, Lower Silesian Voivodeship, in south-western Poland.
