= Głowaczów, Lower Silesian Voivodeship =

Głowaczów
- Village
- Location within Poland
- Coordinates: 50°39′23″N 17°10′33″E
- Country: Poland
- Voivodeship: Lower Silesian
- County: Strzelin
- Gmina: Przeworno

Głowaczów [ɡwɔˈvat͡ʂuf] is a village in the administrative district of Gmina Przeworno, within Strzelin County, Lower Silesian Voivodeship, in south-western Poland.
