= Samborowice, Lower Silesian Voivodeship =

Samborowice
- Village
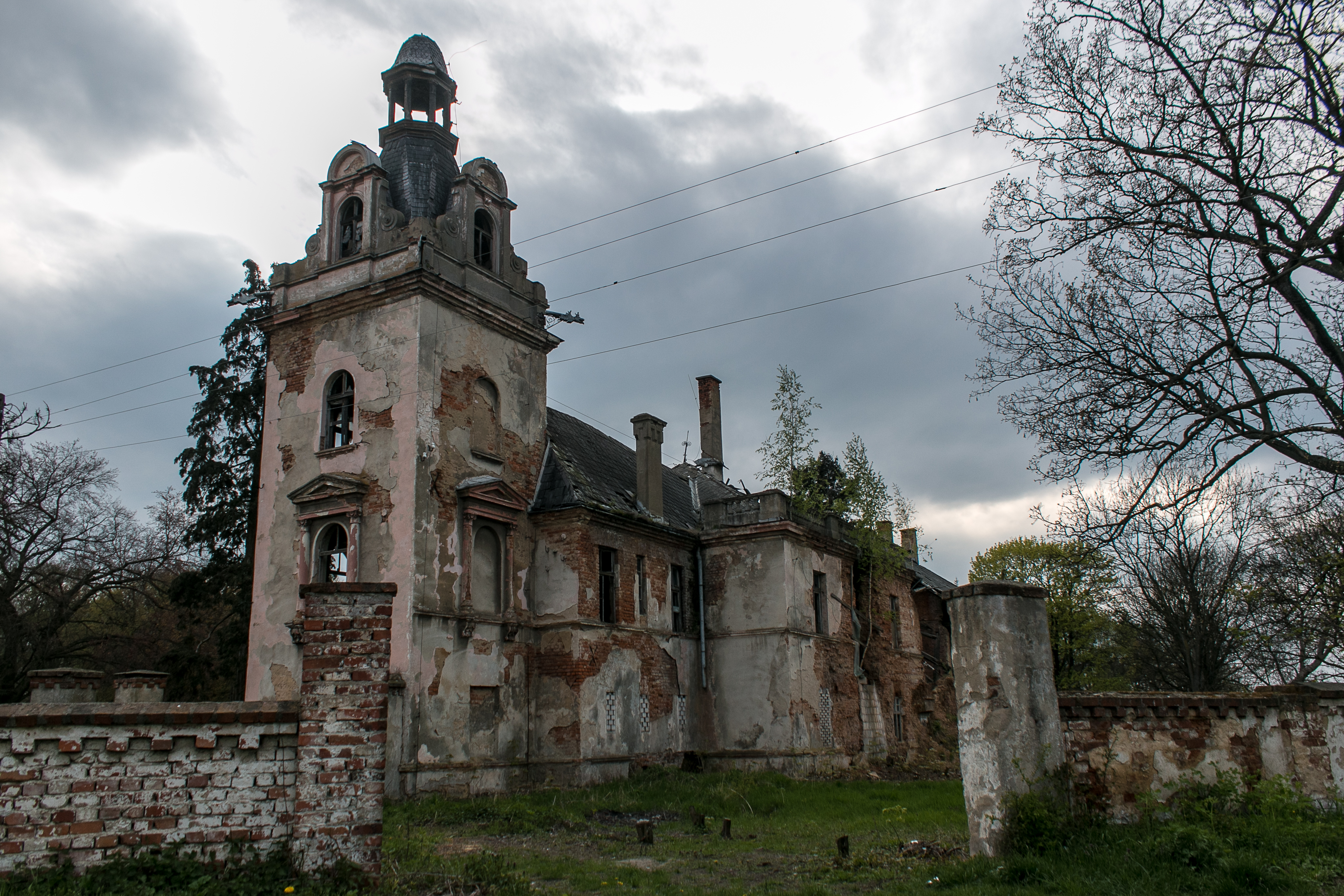
- Ruined palace in Samborowice

- Location within Poland
- Coordinates: 50°37′48″N 17°14′00″E
- Country: Poland
- Voivodeship: Lower Silesian
- County: Strzelin
- Gmina: Przeworno

Samborowice [sambɔrɔˈvit͡sɛ] is a village in the administrative district of Gmina Przeworno, within Strzelin County, Lower Silesian Voivodeship, in south-western Poland.
