= Mników, Lower Silesian Voivodeship =

Mników
- Village
- Location within Poland
- Coordinates: 50°37′58″N 17°09′07″E
- Country: Poland
- Voivodeship: Lower Silesian
- County: Strzelin
- Gmina: Przeworno

Mników [ˈmnikuf] is a village in the administrative district of Gmina Przeworno, within Strzelin County, Lower Silesian Voivodeship, in south-western Poland.
