= Sarby =

- Village
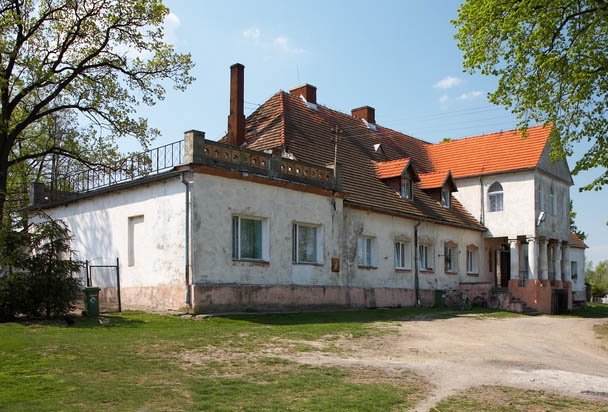
- Manor

- Location within Poland
- Coordinates: 50°38′40″N 17°10′20″E
- Country: Poland
- Voivodeship: Lower Silesian
- County: Strzelin
- Gmina: Przeworno

Sarby [ˈsarbɨ] is a village in the administrative district of Gmina Przeworno, within Strzelin County, Lower Silesian Voivodeship, southwestern Poland.
