= Krynka, Lower Silesian Voivodeship =

Krynka
- Village
- Location within Poland
- Coordinates: 50°40′10″N 17°10′57″E
- Country: Poland
- Voivodeship: Lower Silesian
- County: Strzelin
- Gmina: Przeworno

Krynka [ˈkrɨnka] is a village in the administrative district of Gmina Przeworno, within Strzelin County, Lower Silesian Voivodeship, in southwestern Poland.
