= Otmuchów–Dziewiętlice railway =

Railway line in Poland

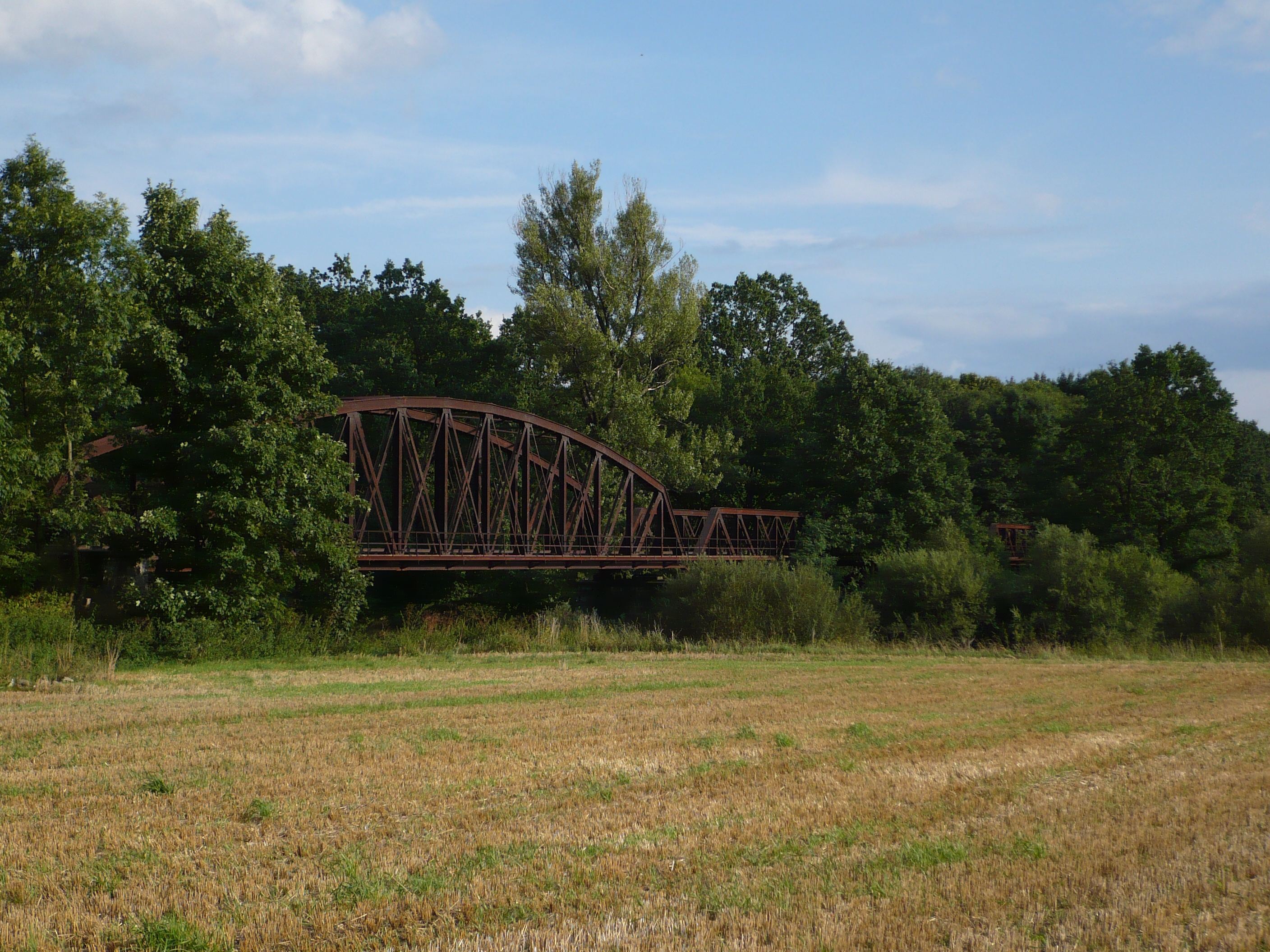
- Railway bridge of the Otmuchów–Dziewiętlice railway in Otmuchów

Overview
- Status: Defunct
- Owner: KPEV; DR; PKP PLK
- Line number: 259 (D29-1971)
- Locale: Poland
- Termini: Otmuchów; Dziewiętlice
- Connecting lines: Sudeten Main Line
- Former connections: Lipová Lázně–Javorník railway
- Stations: 6

Service
- Type: Heavy rail

History
- Opened: 1st November 1893
- Closed: 2009

Technical
- Line length: 14.4 km (8.9 mi)
- Number of tracks: Single track
- Track gauge: 1,435 mm (4 ft 8 1/2 in) standard gauge
- Operating speed: 30 km/h (19 mph)

The Otmuchów–Dziewiętlice railway is a defunct 14.4 km (8.9 mi) long branch line in Poland, connecting the town of Otmuchów, the village of Dziewiętlice, and Bernartice in the Czech Republic. The railway opened in 1893, it was extended to Bernartice in 1896. The Dziewiętlice–Bernartice section was dismantled in 1945 and passenger traffic was ceased in 1961 along with the freight traffic being ceased on the Otmuchów Cukrownia–Dziewiętlice section that same year. The Otmuchów–Otmuchów Cukrownia section was closed in 2009, fully closing the railway.

The railway used to be numbered 197 according to D29 from 1949, the number was changed to 259 in 1971. The railway was still operational in 1985 while most of the railways applied new numbering, despite this the railway was used as a shunting branch line and rest of the railway was decided to be dismantled. The number applied in 1971 is still used as the current railway number after the closure.

== Route ==
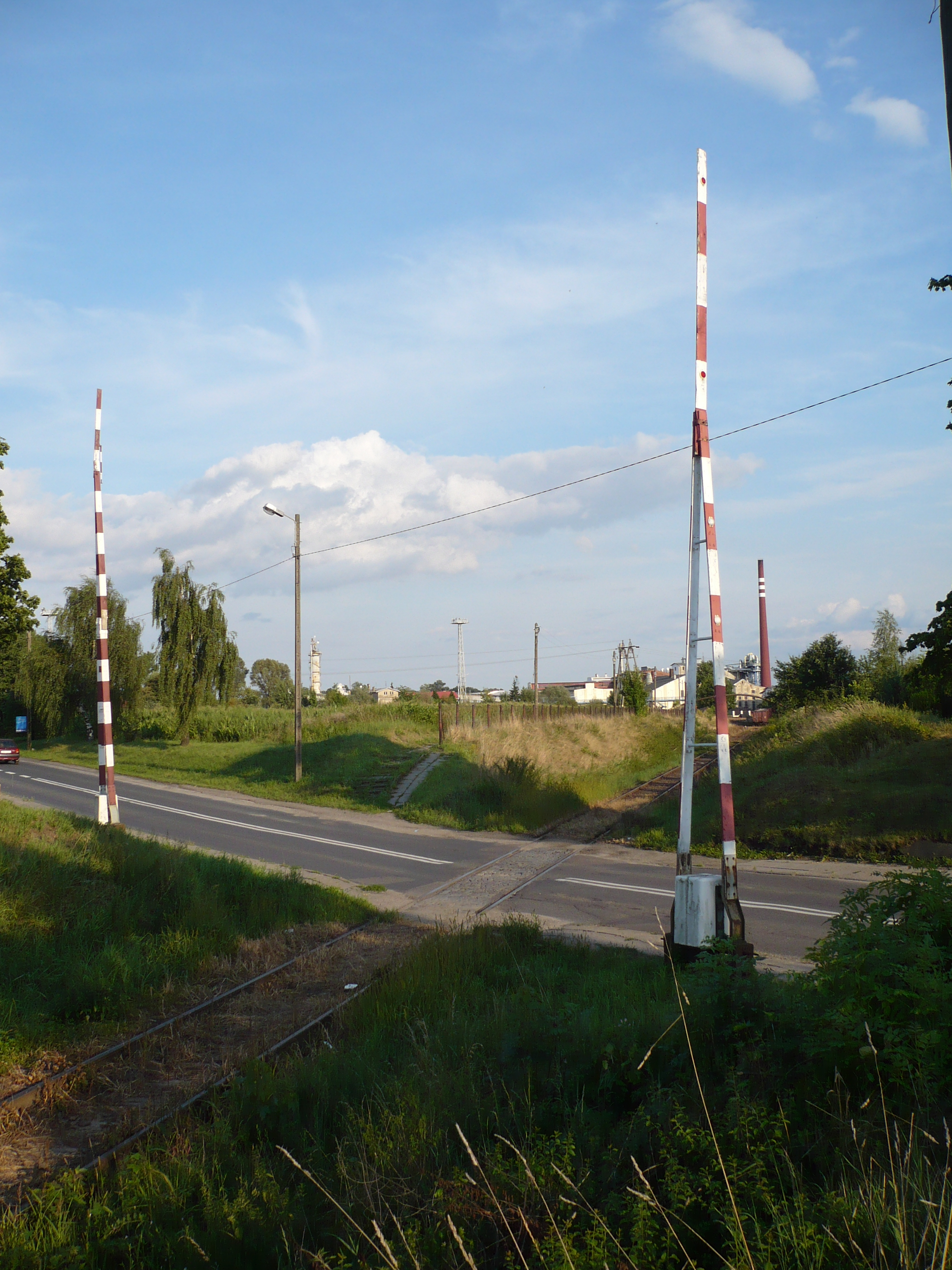
Railway crossing on the Młynska street in Otmuchów

The line starts at Otmuchów railway station on the Sudeten Main Line where it heads straight east to Młyńska street, after crossing the street, the line shifts south west heading through the town, crossing a footpath, Sienkiewicza street, Grodkowska street and Nyska street. After crossing Nyska street the line is branched with a sugar mill connected with industrial tracks, the line shifts south passing Otmuchów Cukrownia station (2.9 km of the line), crossing the 1st of May street and the Eastern Neisse river via a railway bridge.

The line heads to Śliwice passing the village and the Śliwice Śląskie station (5.2 km of the line), then it changes direction to Meszno where it passes Świdna stream and Meszno Nyskie station (7.7 km of the line), after crossing a dirt road the line passes Trzeboszowice Nyskie station (9.9 km of the line) near Trzeboszowice and crosses another dirt road heading to Ratnowice.

Upon entering Dziewiętlice the line shifts south crossing both roads and stopping at Dziewiętlice railway station (13.4 km of the line). The line continues to cross the Czech–Polish border and ends at Bernartice u Javornika railway station on the Lipová Lázně–Javorník railway in Bernartice.

== History ==
Österreichische Lokaleisenbahngesellschaft (ÖLEG) in the concession granted for the construction of the Hannsdorf–Ziegenhals (Hanušovice–Głuchołazy) railway had a condition stipulated on the construction of a cross-border railway connection in Barzdorf (Bernartice) and Groß Kunzendorf (Velké Kunětice), this was granted in a state treaty between the German Empire and Austria-Hungary for establishing several railway connections on 14 March 1885, the commitment was then taken by the country in 1893. On 1 November 1893 the railway between Ottmachau and Heinersdorf (Otmuchów and Dziewiętlice) was opened on the German side, while a year later on 20 December 1894 the Nieder Lindewiese–Barzdorf (Lipová-lázně–Bernartice) railway line started its construction on the Austrian side. The Nieder Lindewiese–Barzdorf line was completed on 2 July 1896 and began its international service between Ottmachau and Nieder Lindewiese, with Heinersdorf station being a border station. The Nieder Lindewiese–Barzdorf branch lines to Jauernig (Javornik) and Weidenau (Vidnava) were opened in 1897.

In 1924, an 800-metre branch line was built to transport clay from the clay pit next to Eastern Neisse river to the brickworks between Ottmachau and Schleibitz (Śliwice), next to the brickworks was a loading track, there was a narrow gauge railway on the end of the branch line which went further to the clay pit, the branch line was dismantled in 1936. In 1928 a branch line leading to the construction site of the dam and power plant was built to transport materials for the construction of the Ottmachau lake, the branch line was dismantled in 1933 after the lake was finished.

After the conclusion of the Munich Agreement on 29 September 1938, the Sudetenland belonged to the German territory. The Reischbahn Directorate of Oppelin took over the routes and operated the Ottmachau–Nieder Lindewiese railway. After World War II, The passage of the front meant for the railway to cease transport and damage on traffic equipment, the retreating German army withdrawed transport equipment to hinder the progress of the Red Army. Traffic on the Lipová Lázně–Javorník railway was reactivated on 8 September 1945.

On 1 November 1945, the Bernartice–Kwiatkowice (Dziewiętlice) part was dismantled, as it saw no interest of international rail transport, the passenger and freight traffic was reactivated in 1947, the railway was used only for the sugar beet transportation of freight traffic in the 1950s. With the increase of road transport, the Otmuchów Cukrownia - Dziewiętlice section was closed for all traffic on 1st January 1961, and was decided to dismantle the railway section on 1st January 1977, with the railway being dismantled in the 1980s.

Due to the closure of the Otmuchów Sugar Mill, the railway closed in 2009, ceasing freight traffic. A trail on the railway track between Sienkiewicza street and Grodkowska street is used by the pedestrians, the trail was made after the railway closed, it is currently used today. In 2025, a railway bridge crossing Nysa Kłodzka river was converted into bicycle and pedestrian bridge, funded by the European Union the cost was estimated 2.3 million PLN.

== Service ==
=== Passenger ===
The railway saw 4 passenger trains operating each day in summer 1900, 2 or 3 trains operated between Ottmachau (Otmuchów) and Heinersdorf (Dziewiętlice), and 1 or 2 trains operated between Ottmachau and Nieder Lindewiese (Lipová-lázně). The journey between Ottmachau and Heinersdorf took 35 to 43 minutes and between Ottmachau and Nieder Lindwiese took 1 hours, 46 minutes to 2 hours, 17 minutes.

Summer 1900 timetable
Ottmachau - Nieder Lindewiese					Nieder Lindewiese - Ottmachau				
Station	1st train	2nd train	3rd train	4th train	Station	1st train	2nd train	3rd train	4th train
Ottmachau	9:10	13:00	16:20	19:14	Nieder Lindewiese	5:30	–	–	17:15
Heinersdorf	9:53	13:37	17:03	19:51	Heinersdorf	7:10	10:55	15:05	18:33
Nieder Lindewiese	–	–	–	21:31	Ottmachau	7:38	11:30	15:45	19:01

The 1914 summer timetable saw 5 pairs of 2nd to 4th class passenger trains operating each day between Ottmachau and Heinersdorf. The cross border passenger service between Ottmachau and Nieder Lindewiese later became separated, as the trains only terminated at Heinersdorf. The trains operating between Nieder Lindewiese and Heinersdorf were taken over by ČSD in 1918.

The railway saw 5 trains numbered 47h operating between Ottmachau and Heinersdorf each day in 1933.

The railway saw 7 trains operating between Ottmachau, Barzdorf and Jauernig or Nieder Lindewiese each day, and 8 traIns on Sundays in summer 1939, this was the most number of trains ever recorded operating on the Ottmachau–Heinersdorf railway.

After the war, PKP took over the railway. the railway had a train that did not operate until 1947, the train numbered 139 between Otmuchów, Kwiatkowice (Dziewiętlice) and Bernartice. Despite the terminus being on the Czechoslovak side, the section between Kwiatkowice and Bernartice was dismantled. The train became operational in October with the number changed to 143 and the Dziewiętlice station being mostly used as a terminus (sometimes Bernartice station could be used as a terminus). The Otmuchów–Dziewiętlice (Bernartice) service only lasted a year, as the Dziewiętlice was chosen to be the full terminus of the line.

The railway saw 2 trains of the second class numbered 233 operating between Otmuchów and Dziewiętlice in summer 1960. The last passenger train to Otmuchów departed on 26 May 1962.

=== Freight ===
After the railway opened, it was guaranteed to transport local goods to Germany, including limestone, wood, sugar beet, grain and stone, coal was also transported.

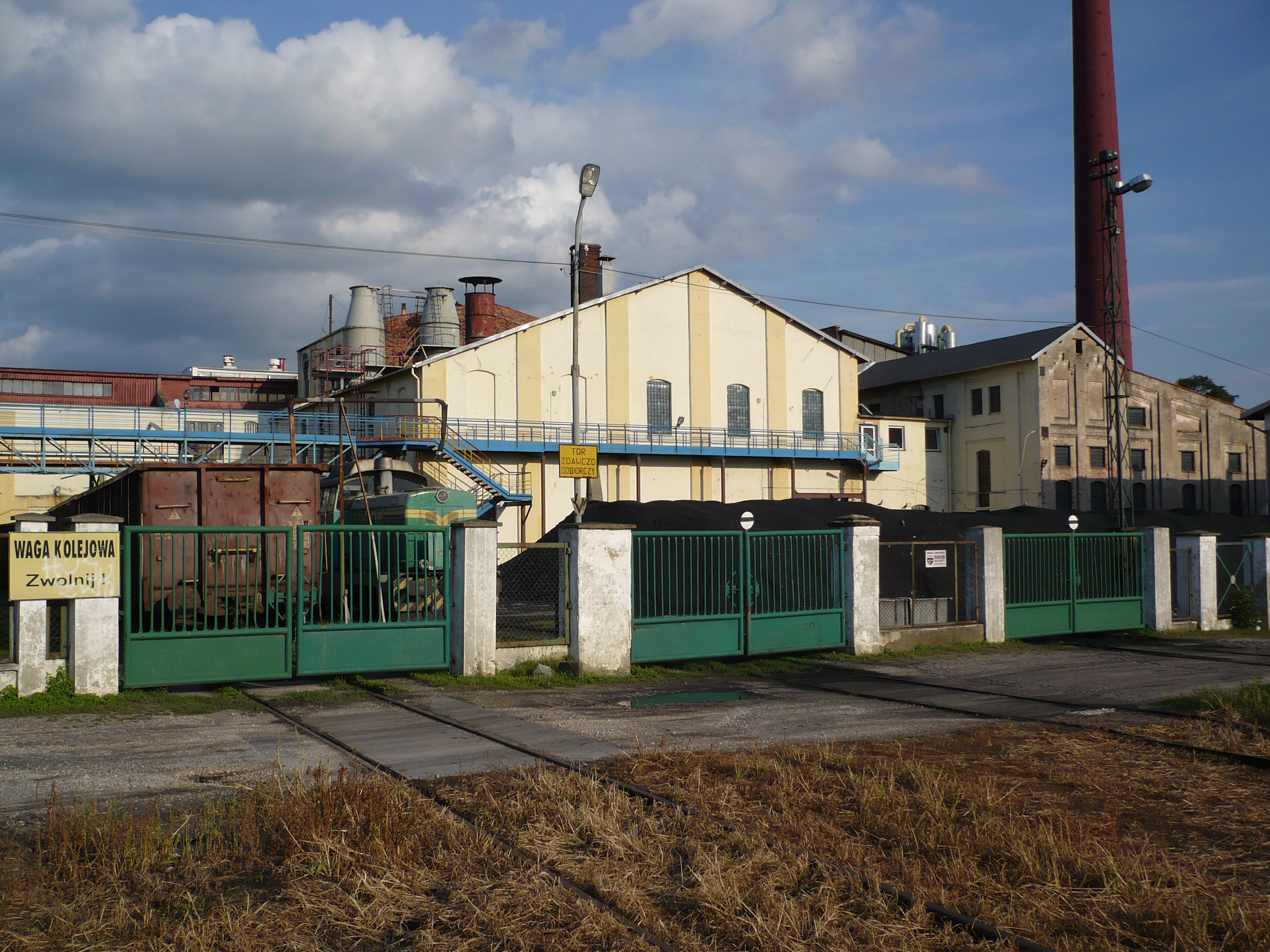
Otmuchów Sugar Mill, which was the most important freight customer of the railway since 1893

Otmuchów Sugar Mill was the most important freight customer of the railway, as it provided sugar beet as the main raw material, the sugar beet was transported from nearby areas of the region, molasses were also transported on the railway from the sugar mill as it was the factory's output, coal was transported from Lower Silesia and Upper Silesia as it was the fuel for the sugar mill. The freight service remained on the railway until 2009 where the sugar mill declared bankruptcy, the last use of freight on the railway was in November 2009 where sugar beet was to be transported to Ropczyce due to a fire in a sugar mill in Strzelin.

Limestone was transported from Austria as well as stone, where they came from quarries near Friedeberg (Žulová), Setzdorf (Vápenná) and Nieder Lindewiese.

Grain was transported on the railway from nearby villages (also from Austria) to Ottmachau where the town had a mill.

Bricks were also transported on the railway from the brickworks between Ottmachau and Schleibitz, the bricks transportation was ceased in 1936. The railway took a role of the Ottmachau lake construction in the years 1928–1933, where the construction materials were delivered mainly from Austria.

== Otmuchów railway bridge ==
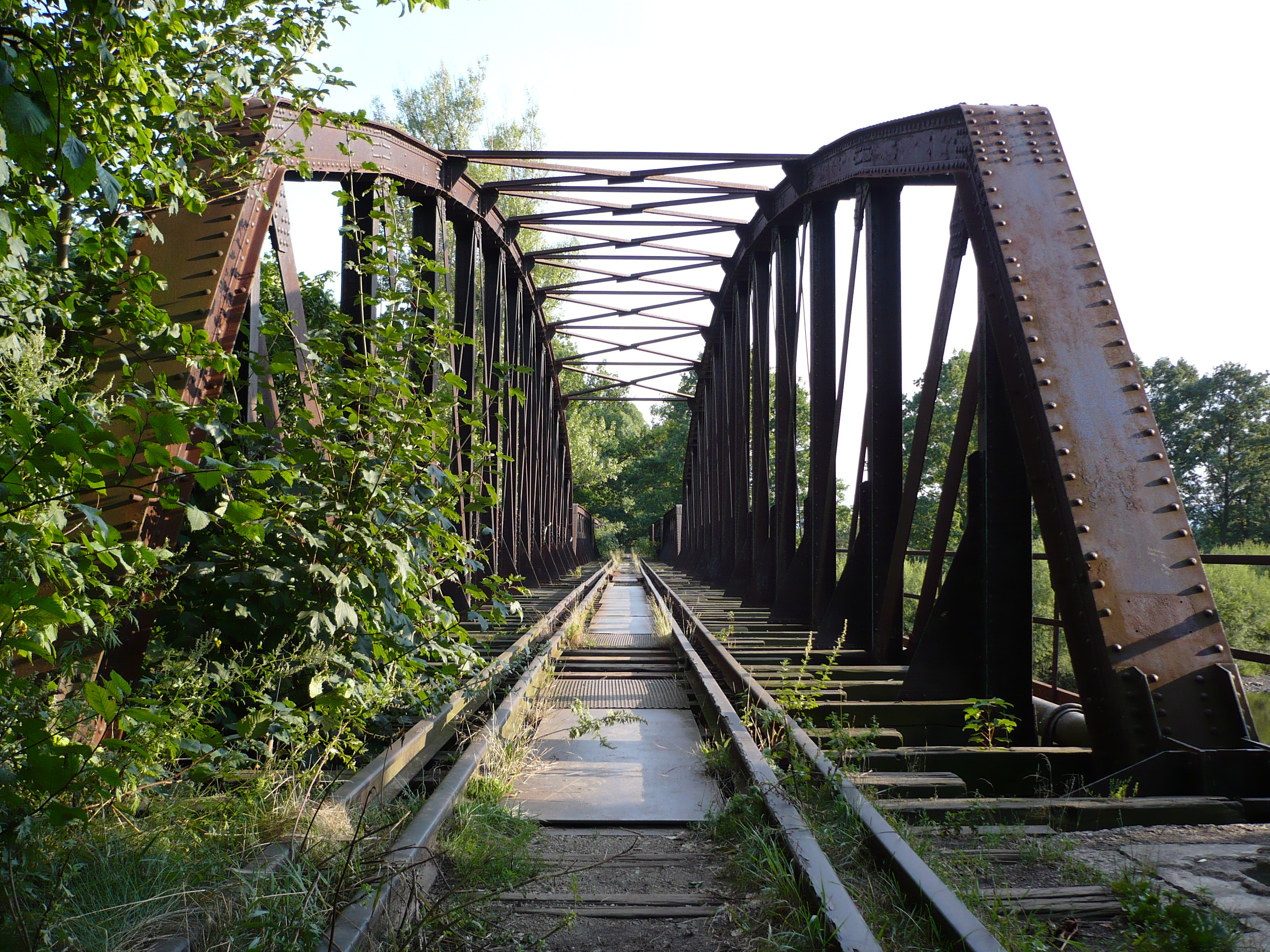
Otmuchów railway bridge prior to its conversion to a bicycle path

The Otmuchów railway bridge crosses the Nysa Kłodzka river in Otmuchów. The bridge has a length of 150 meters and a width of 4.5 meters, it has 4 spans of which the first span has a length of 46 meters and the next 3 spans on the flood plains have a length of 27 meters. The first span of the bridge has a Parker truss structure and the next 3 spans have Pratt truss structures. The bridge was made from steel riveted lattice structure, while the beams were made from stone. The bridge has a nickname which is "Most Cukrowniczy" (English: Sugar Mill Bridge), and it is a technical landmark of Opole Voivodeship.

It was built in 1893 within the construction of the railway, the bridge was used for 67 years until the traffic ceased between Otmuchów Cukrownia and Dziewiętlice, the tracks remained on the bridge while the tracks from the railway were dismantled in the 1980s. In 2017 the bridge was taken over by Gmina Otmuchów, in which was planned to convert it into bicycle and pedestrian bridge, the tracks were dismantled in 2018 and the bottom of the bridge was painted green to protect it from corrosion. 9 companies applied to the tender for its implementation, the cheapest price was estimated 1,6 million PLN while the most expensive price reached to be 2,3 million PLN, it was funded by the European Union. The footbridge was built in 2025, it has a width of 3 meters and has additional spaces for the benches which are not yet added.

== Rolling stock ==
The Prussian T 7 locomotives possibly operated on the railway since it opened, locomotives from ÖLEG and kkStB also operated on the railway terminating only at Heinersdorf. Since the 1970s the railway used SM42 locomotives to pull freight trains to the sugar mill. Two locomotives; LDH45 and Ls40 were used for shunting duties at the sugar mill.
