= Wilamowa =

- Village
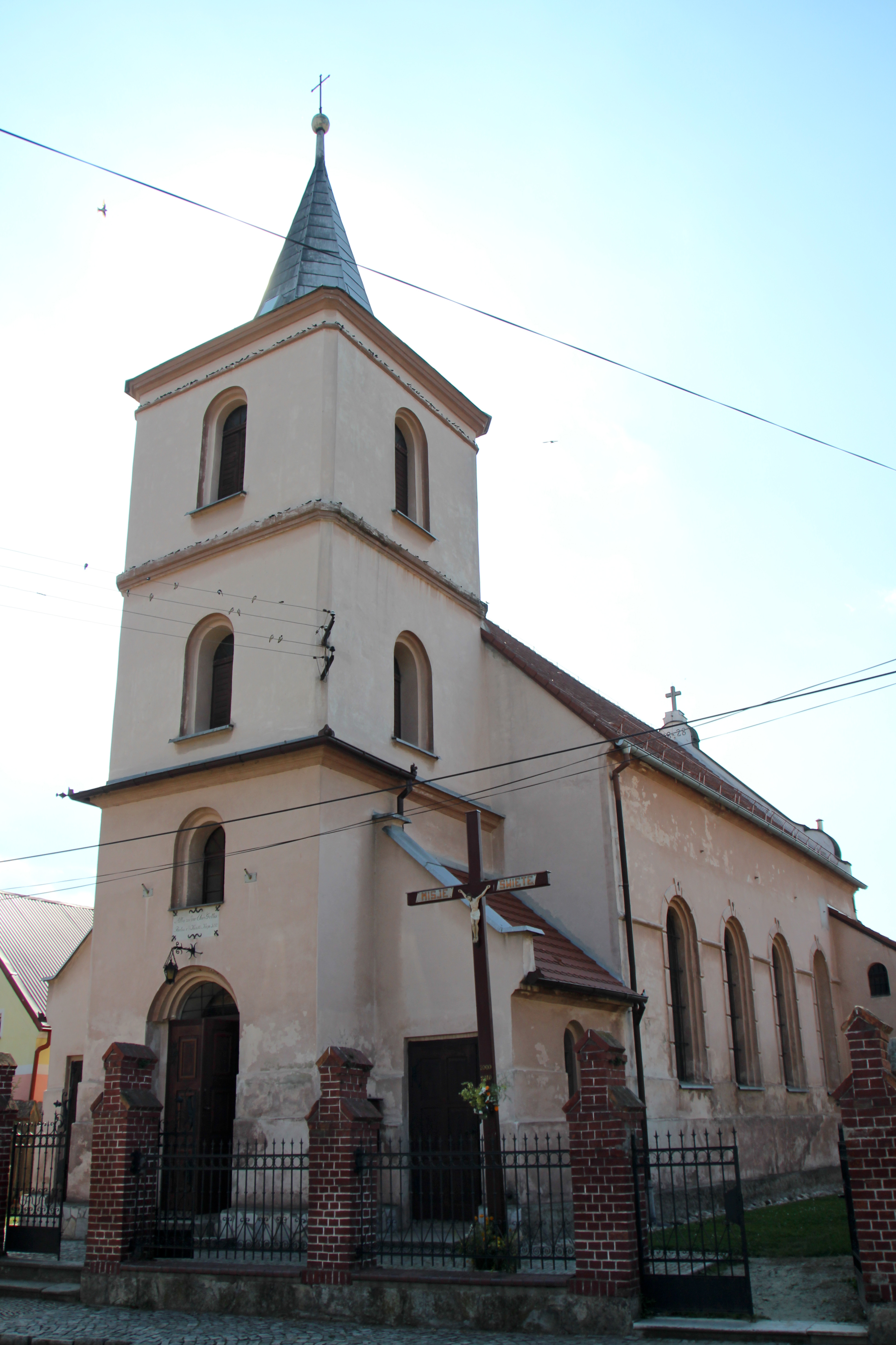

- Location within Poland
- Coordinates: 50°26′37″N 17°4′41″E
- Country: Poland
- Voivodeship: Opole
- County: Nysa
- Gmina: Paczków
- Population: 370

Wilamowa [vilaˈmɔva] (German: Alt Wilmsdorf) is a village in the administrative district of Gmina Paczków, within Nysa County, Opole Voivodeship, in south-western Poland, close to the Czech border. It lies approximately 6 km (4 mi) east of Paczków, 19 km (12 mi) west of Nysa, and 66 km (41 mi) west of the regional capital Opole.
