= Kamienica, Opole Voivodeship =

Kamienica
- Village
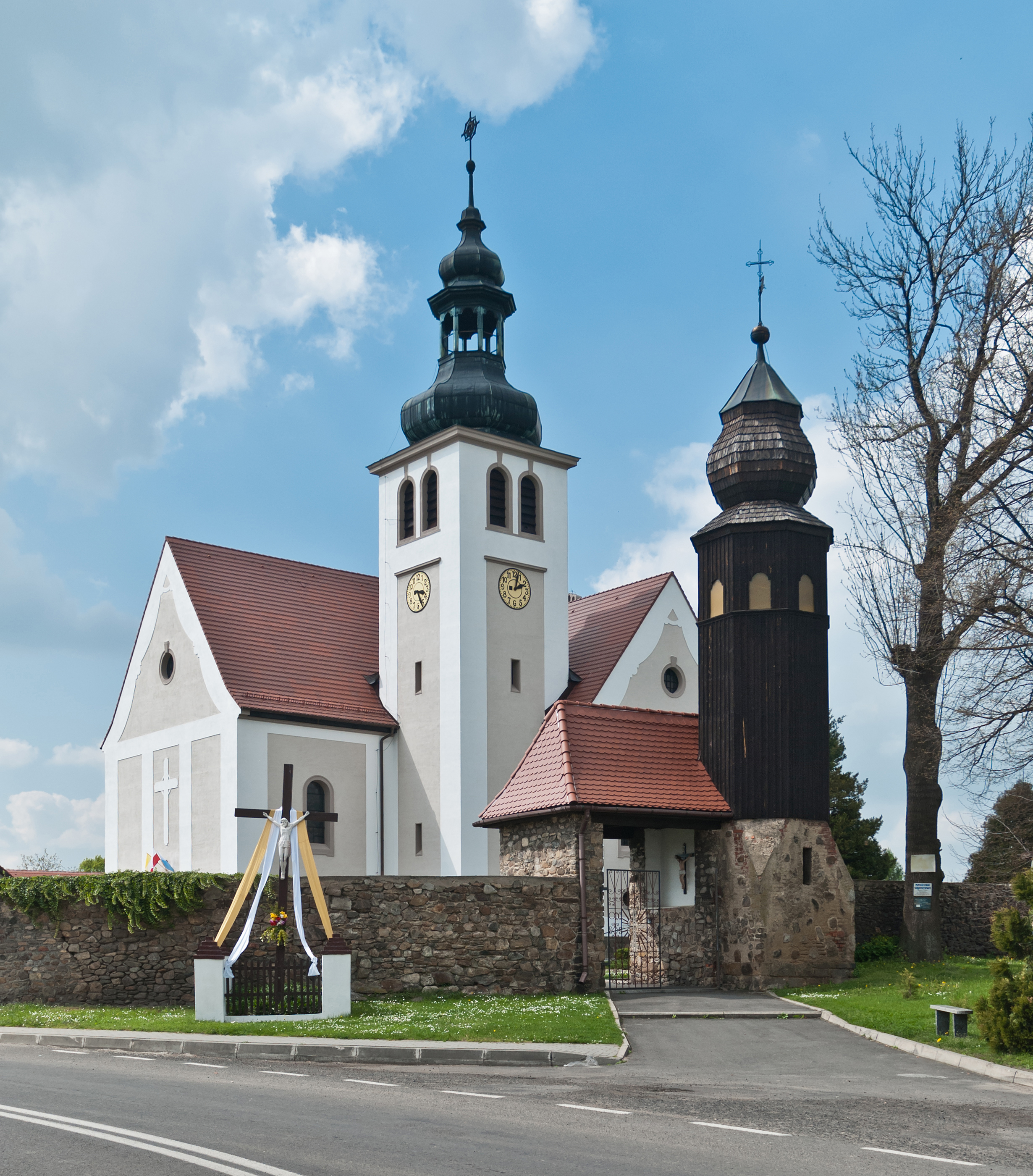
- Saint George church in Kamienica

- Location within Poland
- Coordinates: 50°27′N 16°57′E
- Country: Poland
- Voivodeship: Opole
- County: Nysa
- Gmina: Paczków

Population (approx.)
  - Total: 1,300
- Time zone: UTC+1 (CET)
  - Summer (DST): UTC+2 (CEST)
- Vehicle registration: ONY

Kamienica [kamjɛˈnit͡sa] (German: Kamitz) is a village in the administrative district of Gmina Paczków, within Nysa County, Opole Voivodeship, in south-western Poland, close to the Czech border.

The village was mentioned under its Latinized Old Polish name Cameniza in a document of 1284, when it part of fragmented Piast-ruled Poland. The name is of Polish origin and is derived from the word kamień, which means "stone".

30 Polish citizens were murdered by Nazi Germany in the village during World War II.
