= Stary Paczków =

- Village
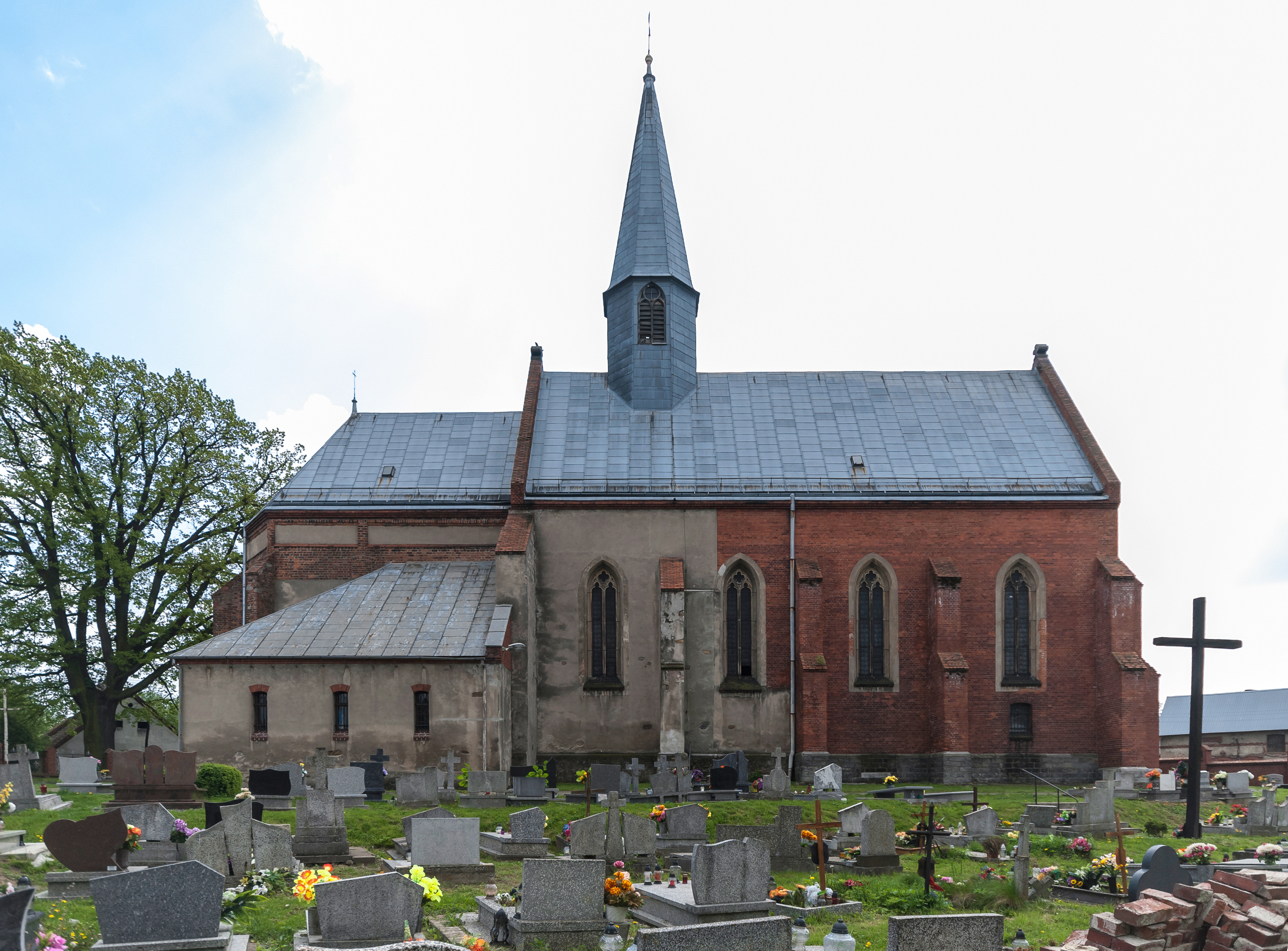
- Church of All Saints in Stary Paczków

- Location within Poland
- Coordinates: 50°27′N 17°2′E
- Country: Poland
- Voivodeship: Opole
- County: Nysa
- Gmina: Paczków
- Time zone: UTC+1 (CET)
  - Summer (DST): UTC+2 (CEST)
- Vehicle registration: ONY

Stary Paczków [ˈstarɨ ˈpat͡ʂkuf] (German: Alt Patschkau) is a village in the administrative district of Gmina Paczków, within Nysa County, Opole Voivodeship, in south-western Poland, close to the Czech border. It is located within the historic region of Lower Silesia.

The landmark of Stary Paczków is the medieval Church of All Saints.

== History ==
Initially named Paczków, it was renamed Stary Paczków (meaning "Old Paczków") after the newly founded town of Paczków nearby took the name in 1254. In a medieval document from 1338 the village was mentioned under the Latinized name Antiquum Paczcow. The name Paczków comes from the Old Polish male name Pakosław. In 1861 the village was inhabited by 810 people, solely of Catholic confession.
