= Książe =

- Village
- Location within Poland
- Coordinates: 50°27′01″N 17°05′40″E
- Country: Poland
- Voivodeship: Opole
- County: Nysa
- Gmina: Paczków
- Time zone: UTC+1 (CET)
  - Summer (DST): UTC+2
- Postal code: 48-370
- Area code: +4877
- Vehicle registration: ONY

Książe (German: Fürstenvorwerk) is a village in the administrative district of Gmina Paczków, within Nysa County, Opole Voivodeship, south-western Poland.
