= Unikowice =

- Village
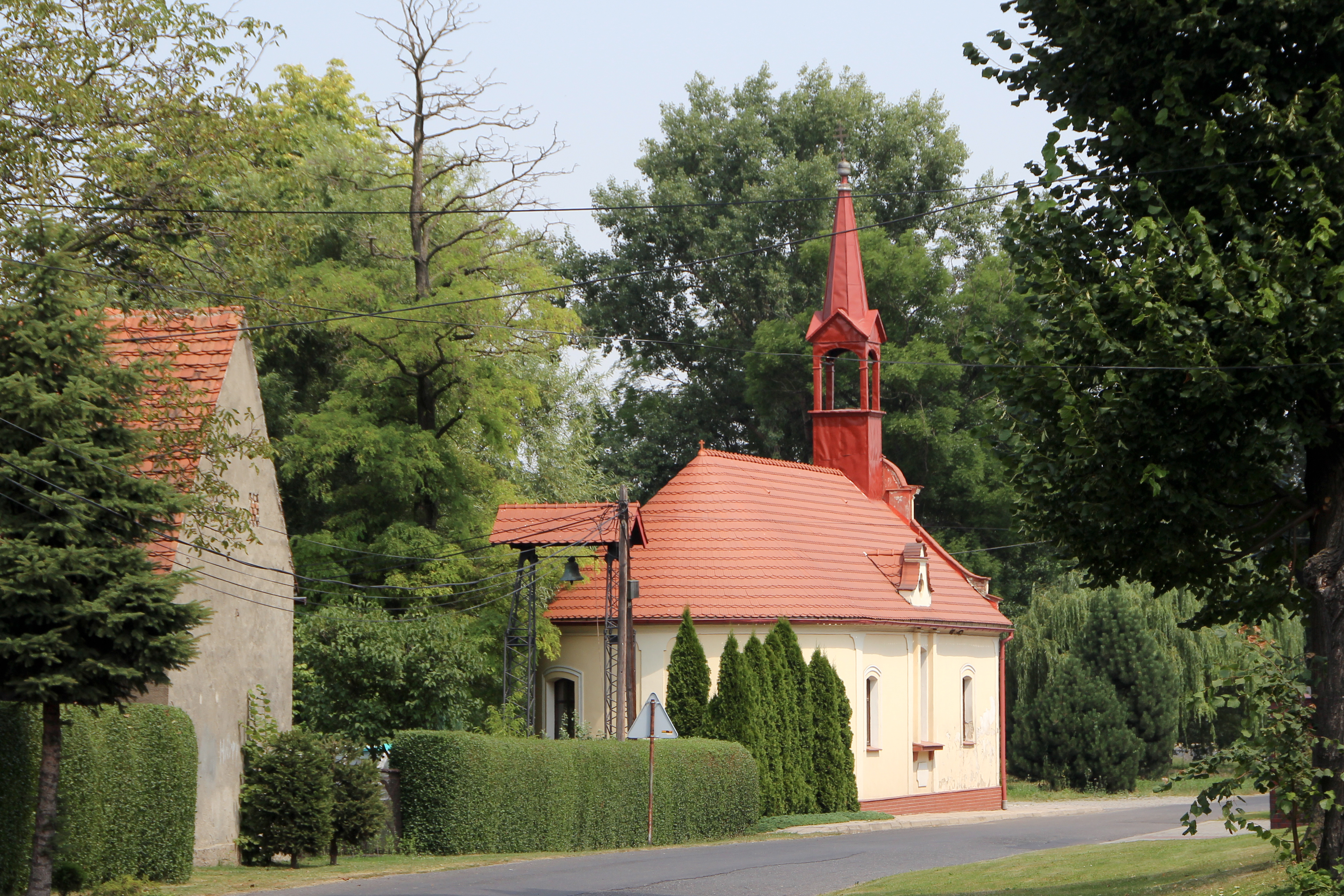

- Location within Poland
- Coordinates: 50°26′40″N 17°0′51″E
- Country: Poland
- Voivodeship: Opole
- County: Nysa
- Gmina: Paczków
- Population: 360

Unikowice [unikɔˈvit͡sɛ] (German: Heinzendorf) is a village in the administrative district of Gmina Paczków, within Nysa County, Opole Voivodeship, in south-western Poland, close to the Czech border.
