= Frydrychów, Opole Voivodeship =

Frydrychów
- Village
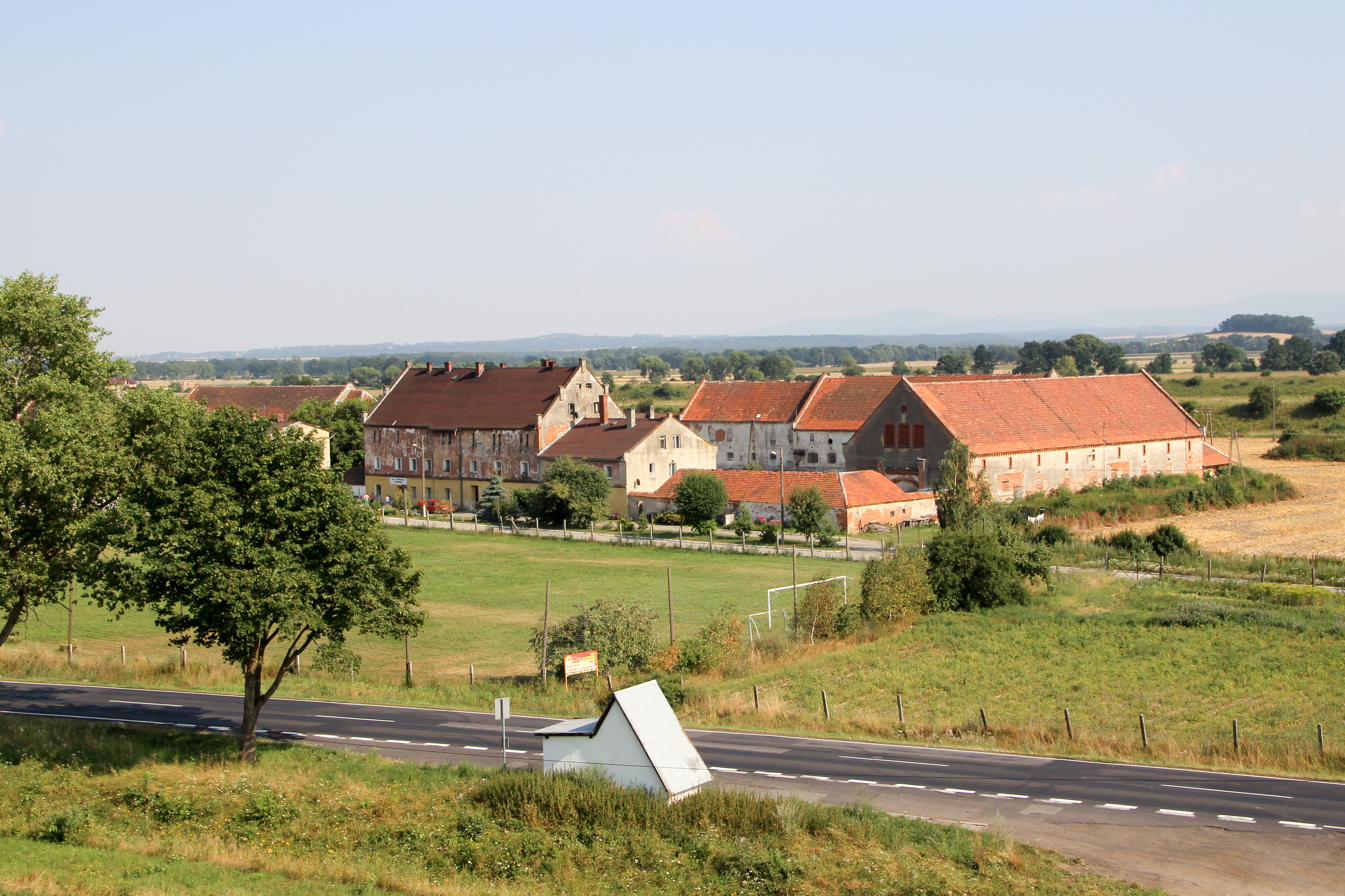

- Location within Poland
- Coordinates: 50°27′06″N 17°08′55″E
- Country: Poland
- Voivodeship: Opole
- County: Nysa
- Gmina: Paczków

Frydrychów [frɨˈdrɨxuf] (German: Friedrichseck) is a village in the administrative district of Gmina Paczków, within Nysa County, Opole Voivodeship, in south-western Poland, close to the Czech border.
