= Ścibórz =

- Village
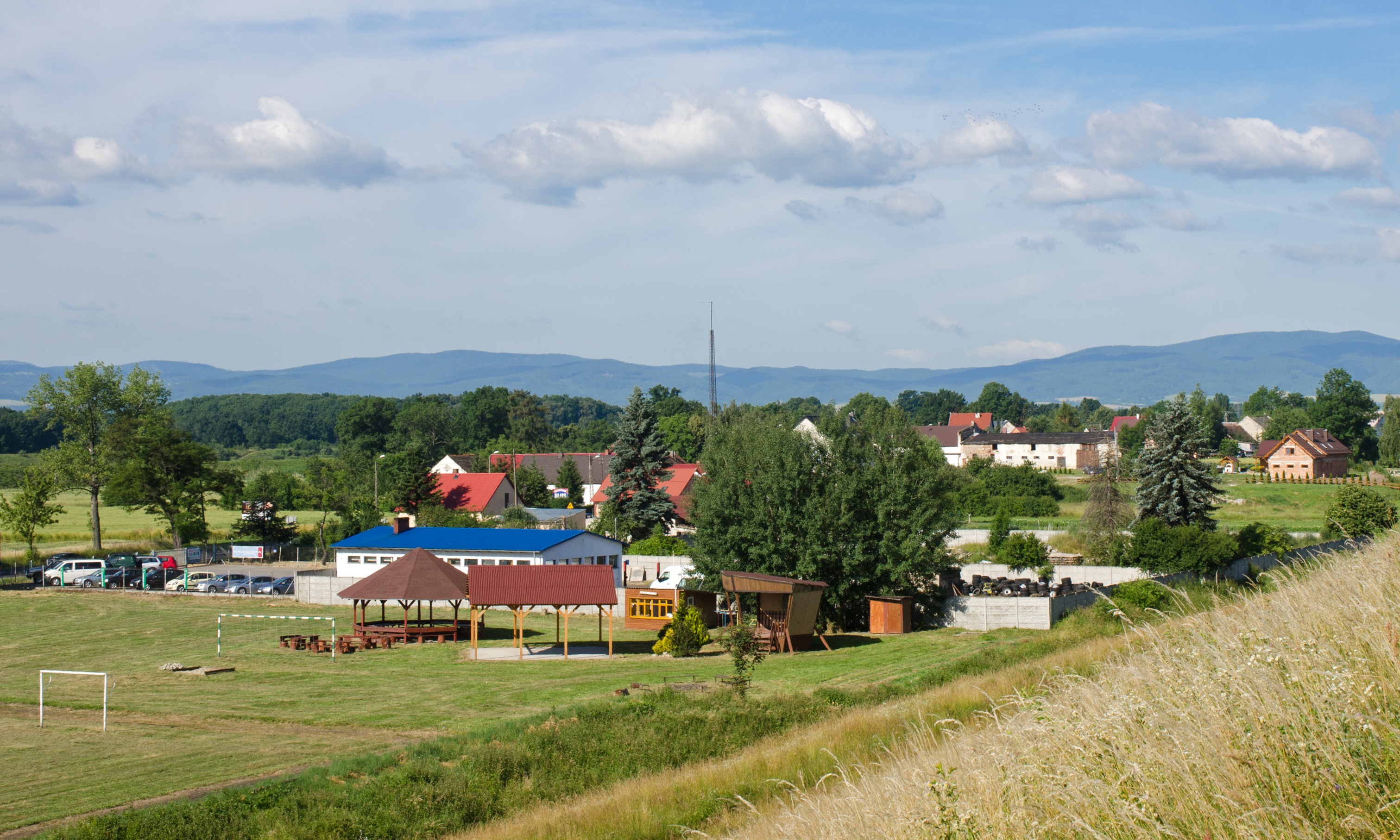
- Ścibórz

- Location within Poland
- Coordinates: 50°26′40″N 17°8′57″E
- Country: Poland
- Voivodeship: Opole
- County: Nysa
- Gmina: Paczków

Ścibórz [ˈɕt͡ɕibuʂ] (German: Stübendorf) is a village in the administrative district of Gmina Paczków, within Nysa County, Opole Voivodeship, in south-western Poland, close to the Czech border.
