= St. John the Evangelist's Church, Paczków =

St. John the Evangelist's Church
- Kościół św. Jana Ewangelisty
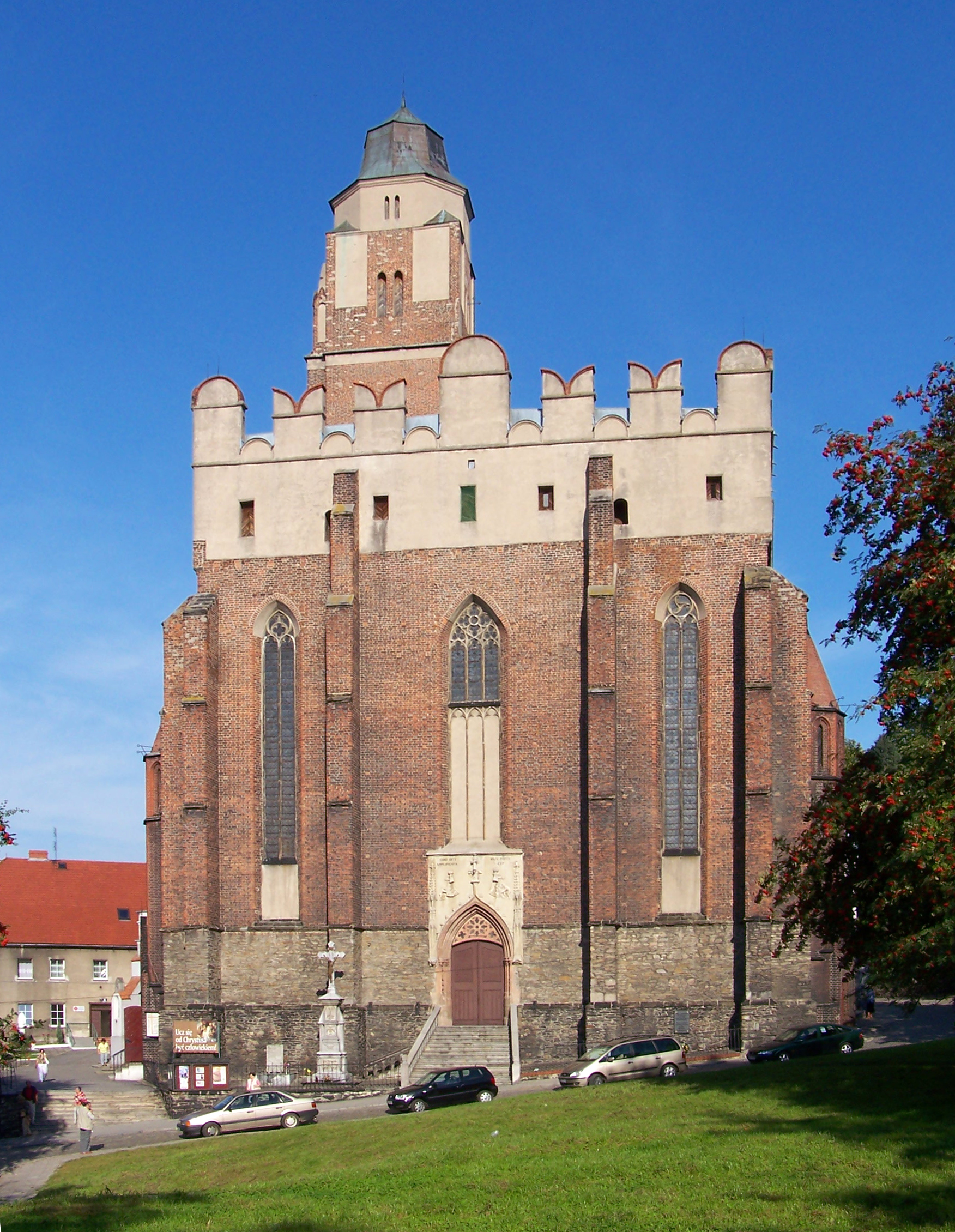
- St. John the Evangelist's Church
- St. John the Evangelist's Church
- 50.2746°N 17.0024°E
- Location: Paczków
- Country: Poland
- Denomination: Roman Catholic

History
- Founder: Bishop of Wrocław Przecław of Pogorzela

Architecture
- Style: Gothic
- Groundbreaking: 1361
- Completed: 1389

Specifications
- Materials: Brick

Administration
- Diocese: Roman Catholic Diocese of Opole

Historic Monument of Poland
- Designated: 2012-10-22
- Part of: Paczków – Old Town ensemble with its medieval fortification system
- Reference no.: Dz. U. z 2012 r. poz. 1240

St. John the Evangelist's Church in Paczków, Poland, is a Gothic church built in the fourteenth century. The church belongs to the Roman Catholic Diocese of Opole.

The beginning of the church's construction began in the year 1350 and lasted around 30 years. The shrine was funded by Bishop of Wrocław Przecław of Pogorzela, who administered between 1341 and 1376. The present form of the church is in the Renaissance, Baroque and Neo-Gothic architectural styles. In the fifteenth century, from the chancel's southern side, there was built a spanning chapel, dedicated to Holy Virgin Mary. The tower, partially deconstructed in 1429, was rebuilt in 1462. It was then that the upper condignation was constructed.
