= Otmuchów Sugar Mill =

Sugar mill in Otmuchów, Poland

Cukrownia Otmuchów S.A.
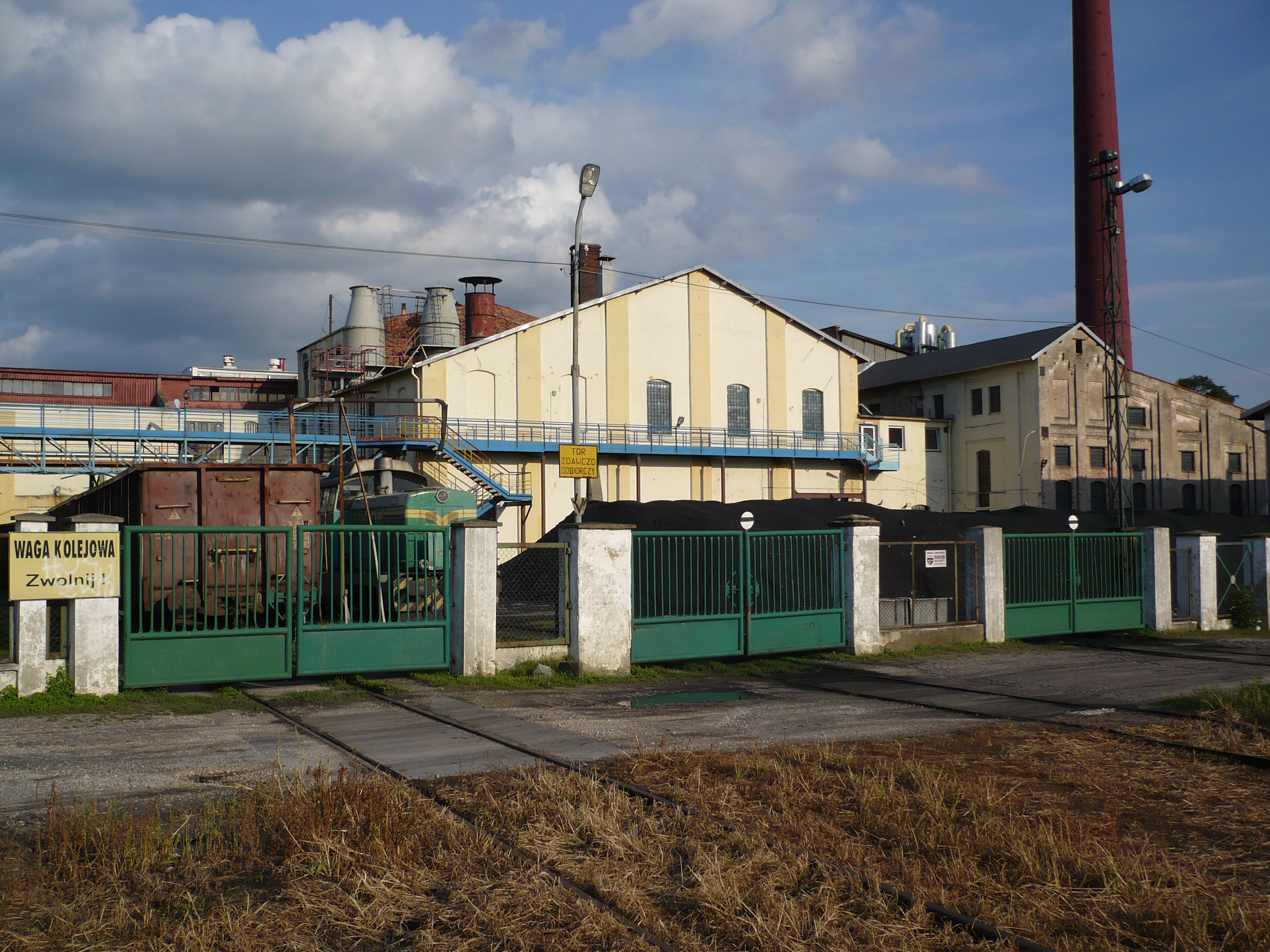
- Sugar mill in 2008
- Industry: Consumer goods sector
- Founded: 1881
- Defunct: 2009
- Headquarters: Otmuchów, Poland
- Products: Sugar
- Number of employees: 100 (2009)

Otmuchów Sugar Mill is a sugar mill located in Otmuchów, Poland. The factory worked for 128 years from 1881 to 2009. It produced about 57,000 tons of sugar yearly, processing 320,000 tons of sugar beets, concetrated about 900 growers in the entire voivodeship. It is the oldest production plant in the town.

== History ==
The sugar mill was founded in 1881, the construction was helped by the building of the road on the Nysa – Kłodzko route and the railway line in 1875. In the pre-war period, the sugar mill processed about 1,400 t (3,100,000 lb) of sugar beet per day and produced raw sugar. After World War II it was still active. In the reform of the nationalization of industry it was nationalized. A lime klin was built in 1948, as it was the sugar mill's major afterwar investment. Between 1956 and 1959, workers' hotels, a fertilizer and seed warehouse were built, and in 1957, a molasses tank for 750 tons of molasses was also built.

In January 1996, the sugar mill was transformed into a sole-shareholder company of the State Treasury. Shares of the sugar mill transformed into a one-man company were transferred to the holding of Śląska Spółka Cukrowa S.A. with its registered office in Łosiowe. In April 2003, the holding company Śląska Spółka Cukrowa S.A. took over the Südzucker AG. In the 2007/2008 season, the sugar mill processed over 300,000 t (660,000,000 lb) of sugar beets and produced 43,000 t (95,000,000 lb) of sugar.

At the end of February 2009, the owner of the factory announced the cease of production and the defunct of the factory, which was closed in June 2009. In 2012, the sugar mill was sold to BRAVET, demolition work was completed, and the site was cleared. The area of the sugar mill was passed to the Wałbrzych Special Economic Zone and was bought by the company Viaregia, which plans to build a paper mill.

== Railway ==
The sugar mill provided its rail transport in 1893 from the Otmuchów–Dziewiętlice railway along with a railway halt. The factory is counted to have 4 sidings along with a weighting station. The locomotives used in the sugar mill were LDH45-012 and Ls40-5191, which as of today LDH45-012 remains displaced and Ls40-5191 put up for sale.
