= Lisie Kąty =

- Village
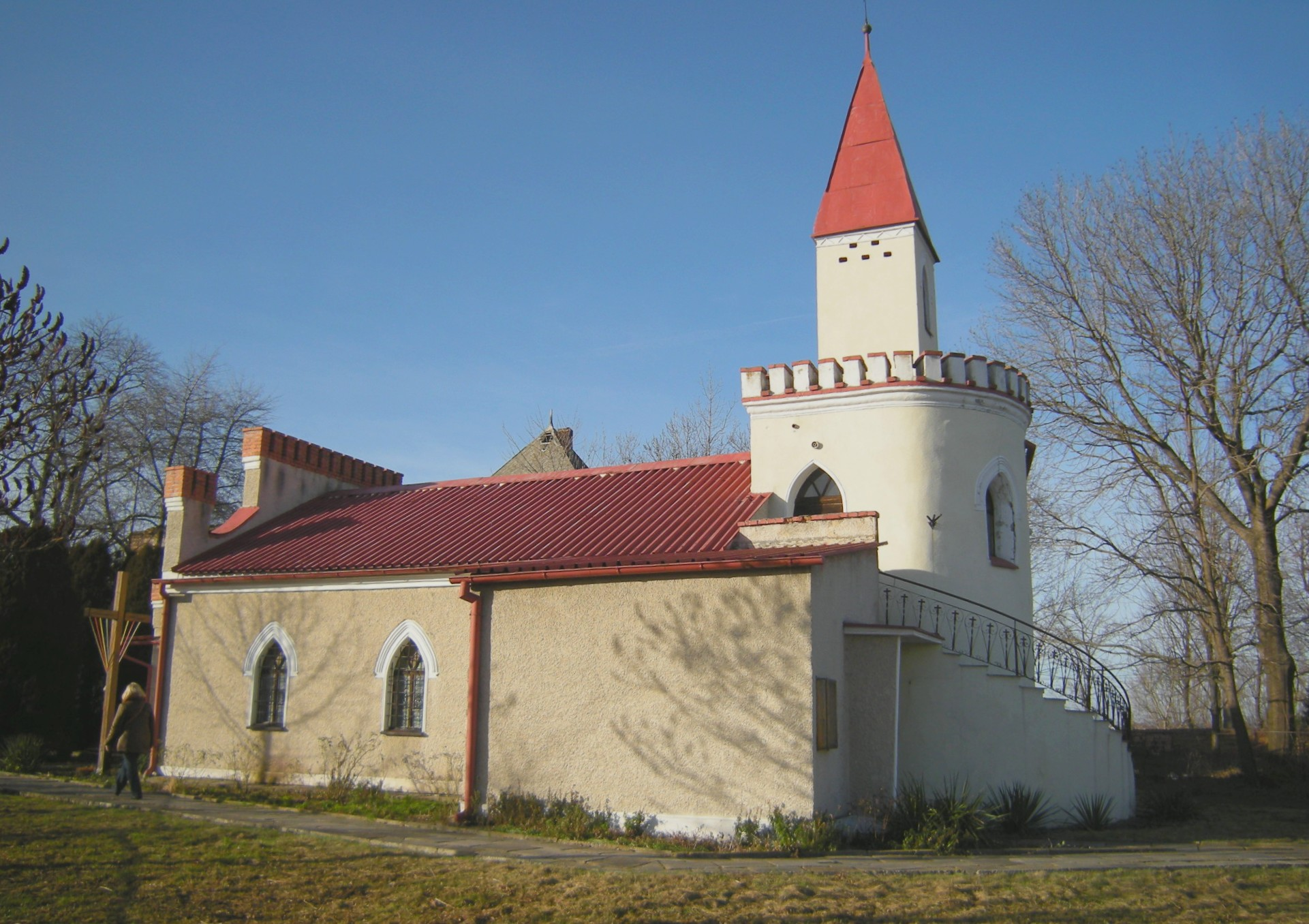
- Manor

- Location within Poland
- Coordinates: 50°25′32″N 17°0′42″E
- Country: Poland
- Voivodeship: Opole
- County: Nysa
- Gmina: Paczków
- Population: 110

Lisie Kąty [ˈliɕɛ ˈkɔntɨ] (German: Fuchswinkel) is a village in the administrative district of Gmina Paczków, within Nysa County, Opole Voivodeship, in south-western Poland, close to the Czech border.
