= Paczków railway station =

Railway station in Poland

Paczków
- Paczków railway station building in 2026

General information
- Location: Paczków, Opole Voivodeship; Poland
- Owner: Polish State Railways
- Line: Katowice–Legnica railway
- Platforms: 2
- Tracks: 2
- Train operators: PKP Intercity; Polregio

Construction
- Architectural style: Rundbogenstil

History
- Opened: 1874
- Closed: 2010 (passenger traffic)
- Former names: Patschkau (before 1945)
Location
- Location within Poland Location within Opole Voivodeship

Paczków is a railway station in Paczków, in the Opole Voivodeship, in Poland. It is located 2 km north of the town center, situated on Dworcowa Street.

The railway station was opened in 1874. In 2010, passenger services were discontinued, and only freight traffic was carried out. In 2013 and 2016, attempts were made to restore passenger services, but without positive results. In December 2017, the new timetable for 2018 included connections through Paczków to Kłodzko, Nysa, Opole, and Kędzierzyn-Koźle on weekends, during holidays, winter breaks, and on certain public holidays.

== Passenger traffic ==
In 2022, the daily passenger exchange at the station was 0-9 passengers
