= Kozielno =

- Village
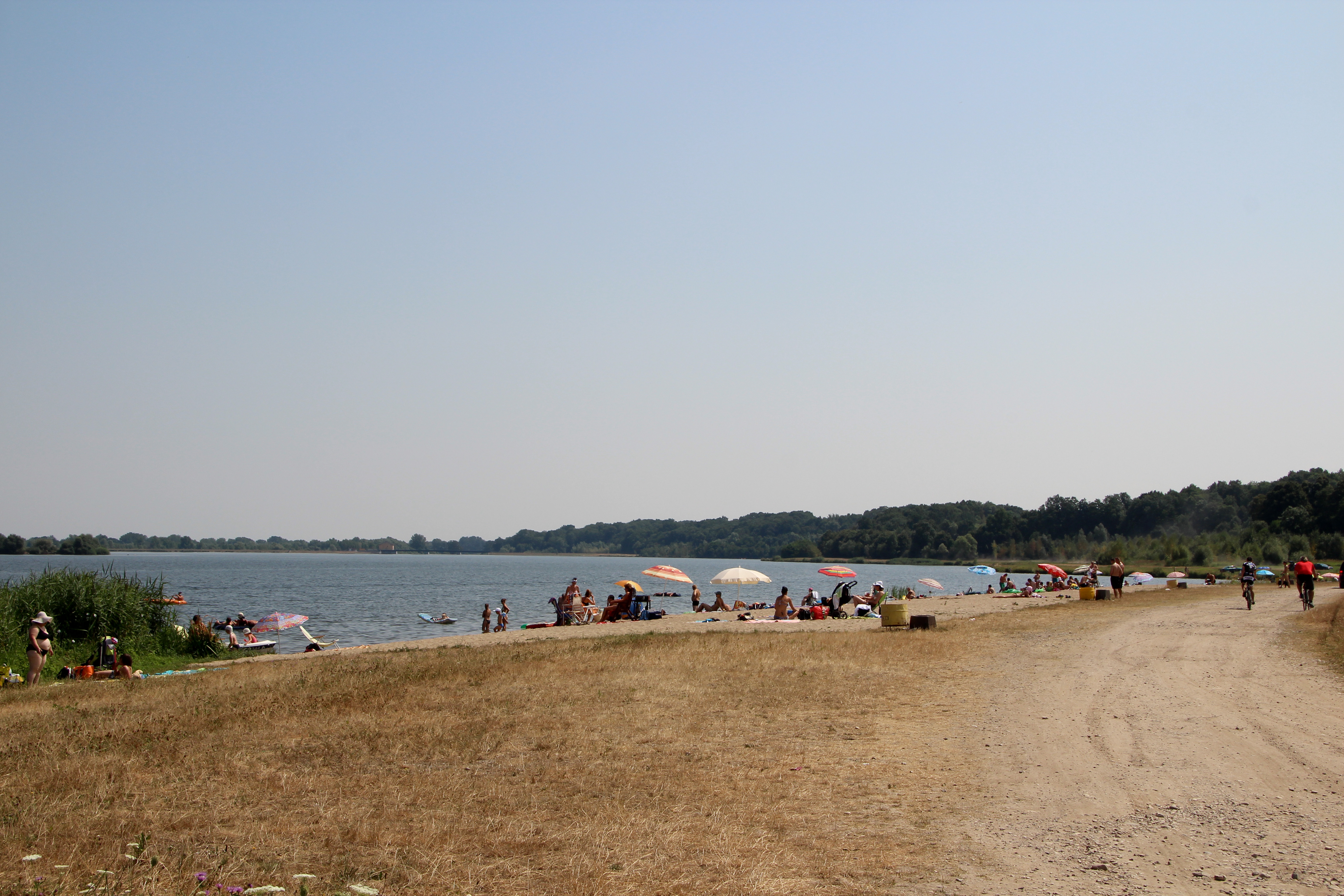
- Beach at the Paczkowski Lake

- Location within Poland
- Coordinates: 50°28′N 16°58′E
- Country: Poland
- Voivodeship: Opole
- County: Nysa
- Gmina: Paczków
- Highest elevation: 250 m (820 ft)
- Lowest elevation: 240 m (790 ft)
- Population: 311

Kozielno [kɔˈʑɛlnɔ] (German: Kosel) is a village in the administrative district of Gmina Paczków, within Nysa County, Opole Voivodeship, in south-western Poland, close to the Czech border.
