= Gmina Paczków =

Gmina Paczków Paczków Commune
- Gmina
- Flag Coat of arms
- Interactive map of Gmina Paczków
- Coordinates (Paczków): 50°27′N 17°0′E
- Country: Poland
- Voivodeship: Opole
- County: Nysa
- Seat: Paczków

Area
  - Total: 79.7 km^{2} (30.8 sq mi)

Population (2019-06-30)
  - Total: 12,560
  - Density: 158/km^{2} (408/sq mi)
  - Urban: 7,460
  - Rural: 5,100
- Website: http://www.paczkow.pl

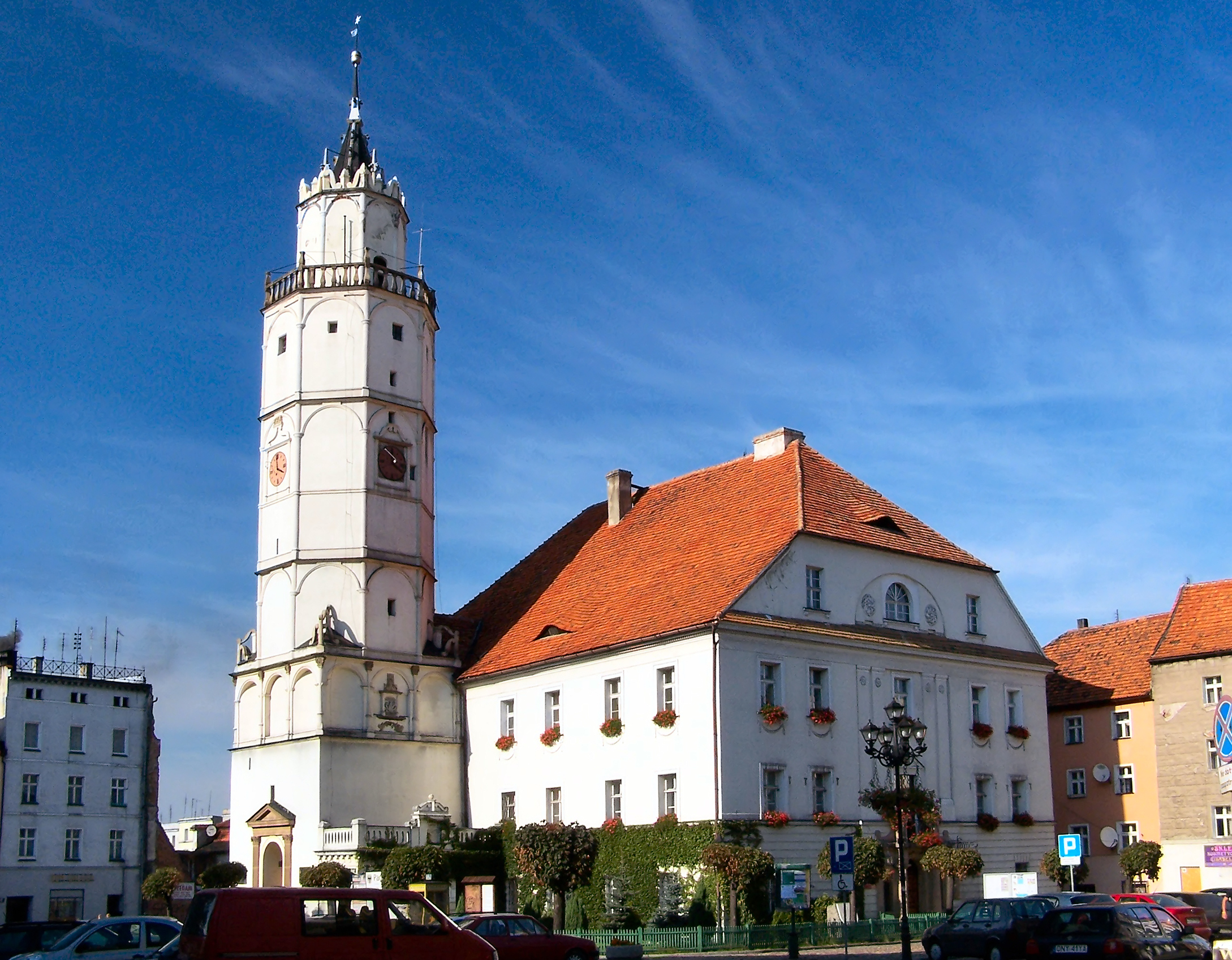
Paczków - Town hall

Gmina Paczków is an urban-rural gmina (administrative district) in Nysa County, Opole Voivodeship, in south-western Poland, on the Czech border. Its seat is the town of Paczków, which lies approximately 24 kilometres (15 mi) west of Nysa and 71 km (44 mi) west of the regional capital Opole.

The gmina covers an area of 79.7 square kilometres (30.8 sq mi), and as of 2019 its total population is 12,560.

== Villages ==
Apart from the town of Paczków, Gmina Paczków contains the villages and settlements of Dziewiętlice, Frydrychów, Gościce, Kamienica, Kozielno, Książe, Lisie Kąty, Ścibórz, Stary Paczków, Trzeboszowice, Ujeździec, Unikowice and Wilamowa.

== Neighbouring gminas ==
Gmina Paczków is bordered by the gminas of Kamieniec Ząbkowicki, Otmuchów, Ziębice and Złoty Stok. It also borders the Czech Republic.

== Twin towns – sister cities ==
Gmina Paczków is twinned with:

- Einbeck, Germany
- Uzès, France
