= Ujeździec =

- Village
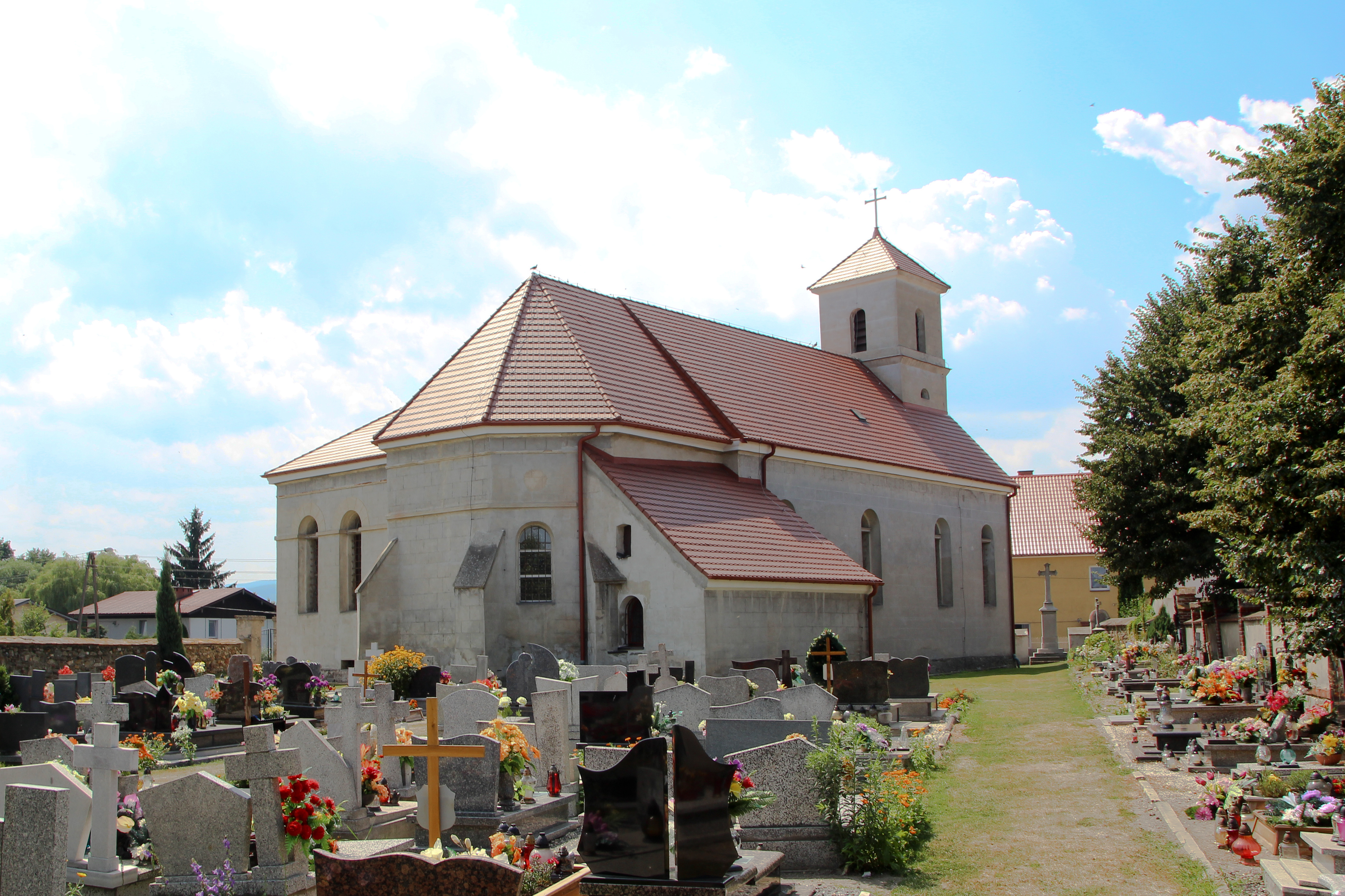
- Saint Catherine of Alexandria church

- Location within Poland
- Coordinates: 50°25′57″N 17°2′56″E
- Country: Poland
- Voivodeship: Opole
- County: Nysa
- Gmina: Paczków
- Population: 443
- Vehicle registration: OST

Ujeździec [uˈjɛʑd͡ʑɛt͡s] (German: Gesess) is a village in the administrative district of Gmina Paczków, within Nysa County, Opole Voivodeship, in south-western Poland, close to the Czech border.

Ujeździec was first mentioned in 1291 as Geseze.
