= Trzeboszowice =

- Village
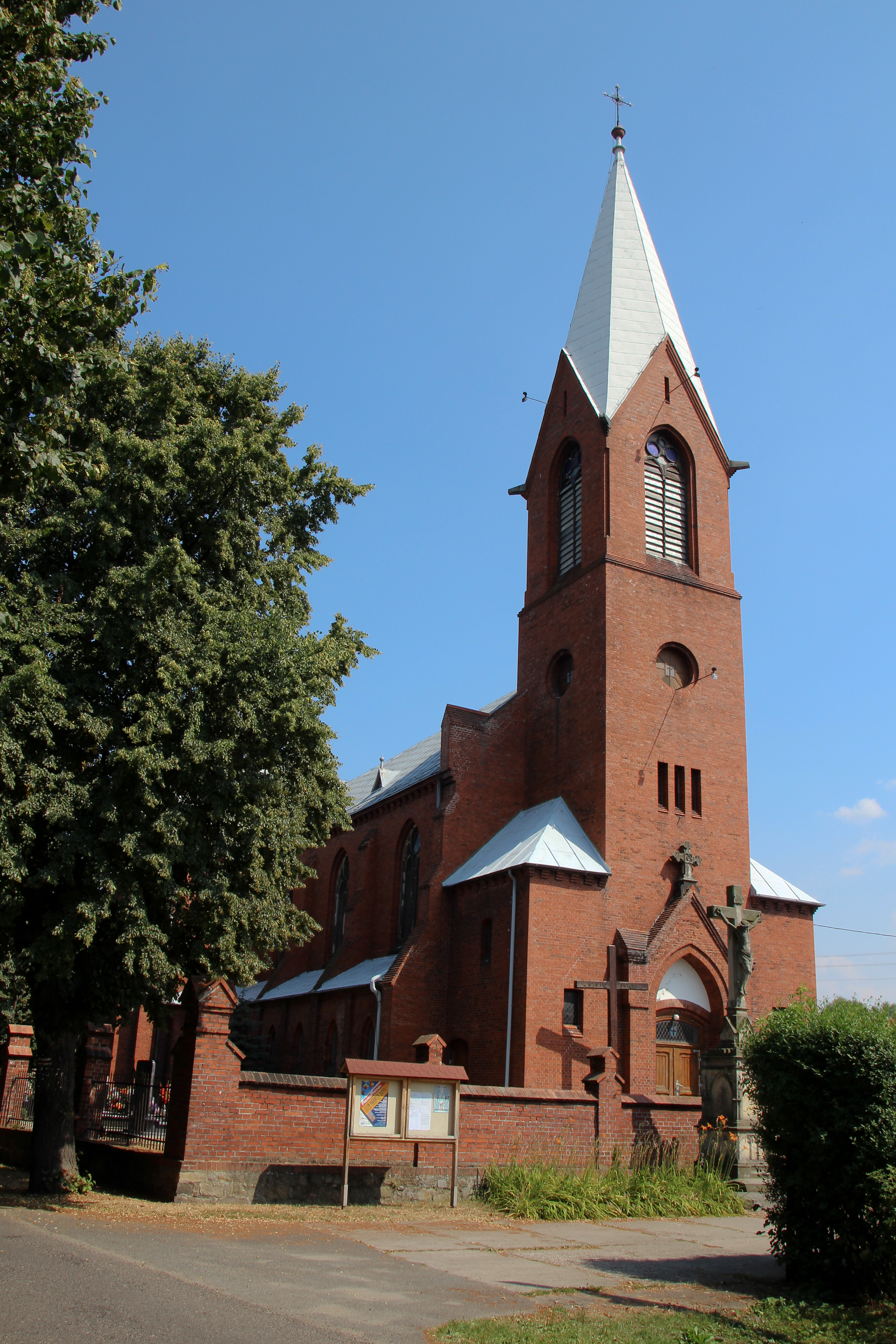
- Church of Saint Hedwig

- Location within Poland
- Coordinates: 50°25′N 17°7′E
- Country: Poland
- Voivodeship: Opole
- County: Nysa
- Gmina: Paczków

Trzeboszowice [tʂɛbɔʂɔˈvit͡sɛ] (German: Schwammelwitz) is a village in the administrative district of Gmina Paczków, within Nysa County, Opole Voivodeship, in south-western Poland, close to the Czech border.
