= Dziewiętlice =

- Village
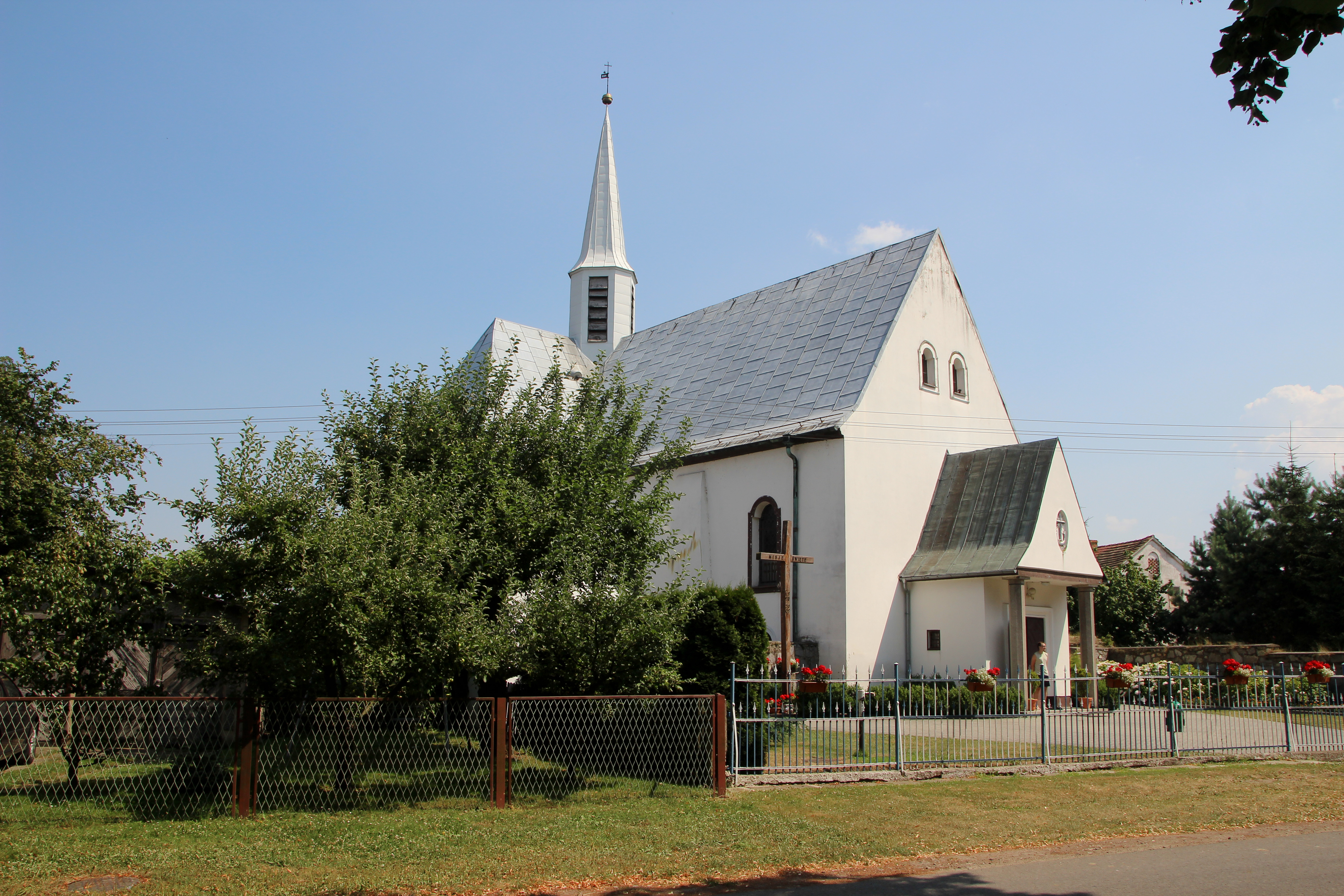
- Mary Magdalene church

- Location within Poland
- Coordinates: 50°24′39″N 17°4′54″E
- Country: Poland
- Voivodeship: Opole
- County: Nysa
- Gmina: Paczków
- Population: 680

Dziewiętlice [d͡ʑɛvjɛnˈtlit͡sɛ] (German: Heinersdorf) is a village in the administrative district of Gmina Paczków, within Nysa County, Opole Voivodeship, in south-western Poland, close to the Czech border.
