= Paczków =

Town in Opole Voivodeship, Poland

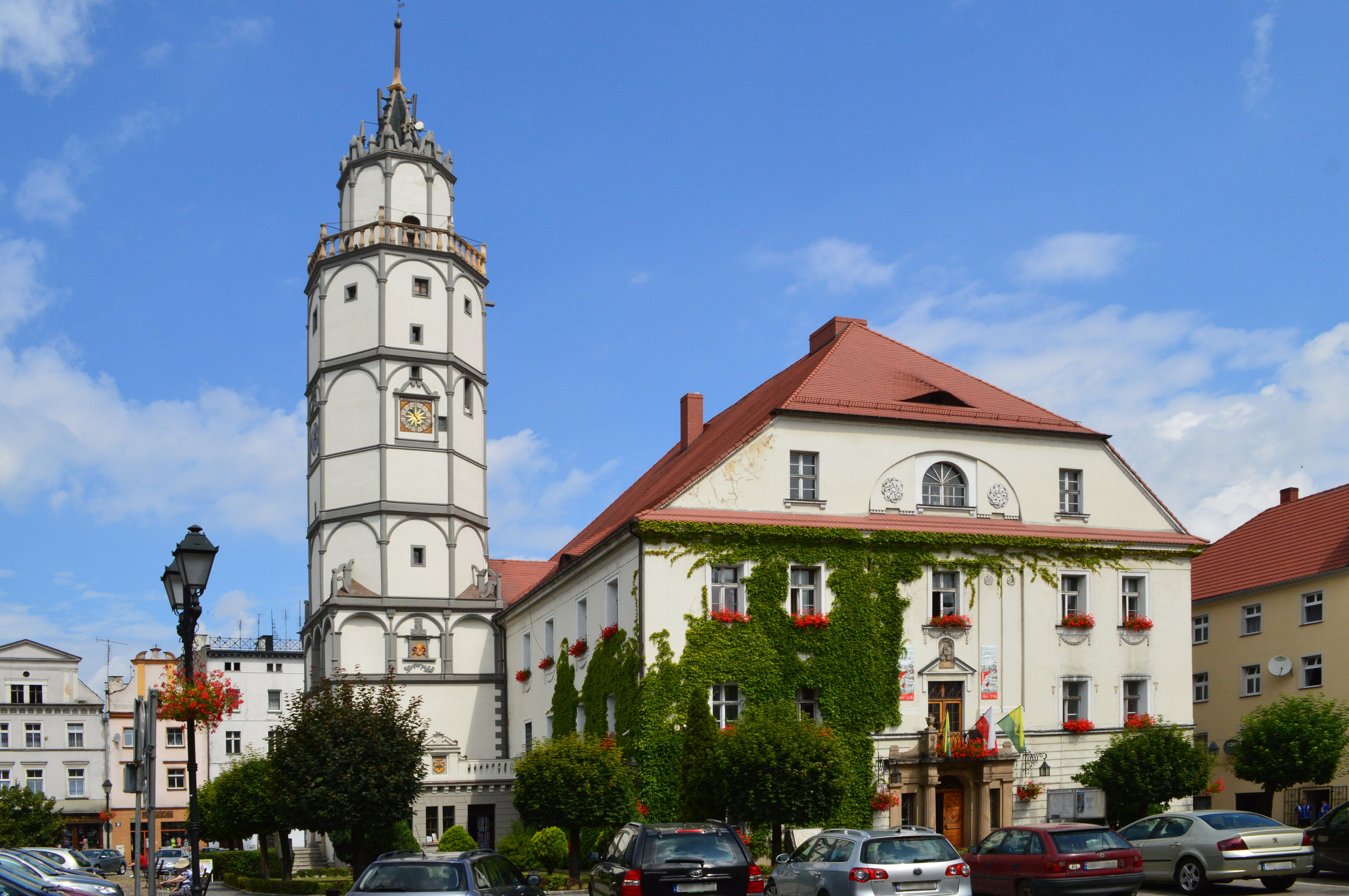
- Paczków Town Hall

- Flag Coat of arms
- Nickname: Polish Carcassonne
- Interactive map of Paczków
- Location within Poland
- Coordinates: 50°27′35″N 17°00′10″E
- Country: Poland
- Voivodeship: Opole
- County: Nysa
- Gmina: Paczków
- Founded: 1254
- Town rights: 1254

Government
  - Mayor: Artur Rolka

Area
  - Total: 6.6 km^{2} (2.5 sq mi)

Population (2019-06-30)
  - Total: 7,460
  - Density: 1,156.2/km^{2} (2,995/sq mi)
- Time zone: UTC+1 (CET)
  - Summer (DST): UTC+2 (CEST)
- Postal code: 48-370
- Vehicle registration: ONY
- Website: http://www.paczkow.pl

Historic Monument of Poland
- Designated: 2012-10-22
- Reference no.: Dz. U. z 2012 r. poz. 1240

Paczków [ˈpat͡ʂkuf] (German: Patschkau; Silesian: Paczkōw) is a town in Nysa County, Opole Voivodeship, in southern Poland, with 7,460 inhabitants (2019). It is one of the few towns in Europe in which medieval fortifications have been almost completely preserved. Located in the southeastern outskirts of the historical province of Lower Silesia, along the medieval road from Lesser Poland to Klodzko Valley and Prague, Paczków is called "Polish Carcassonne", thanks to its well-preserved medieval fortifications. However, while the famous French Carcassonne is a 19th-century reconstruction, all historic buildings of Paczków are authentic.

The old town and its medieval fortifications are listed as one of Poland's official national Historic Monuments (Pomnik historii), as designated November 13, 2012. Its listing is maintained by the National Heritage Board of Poland.

== History ==
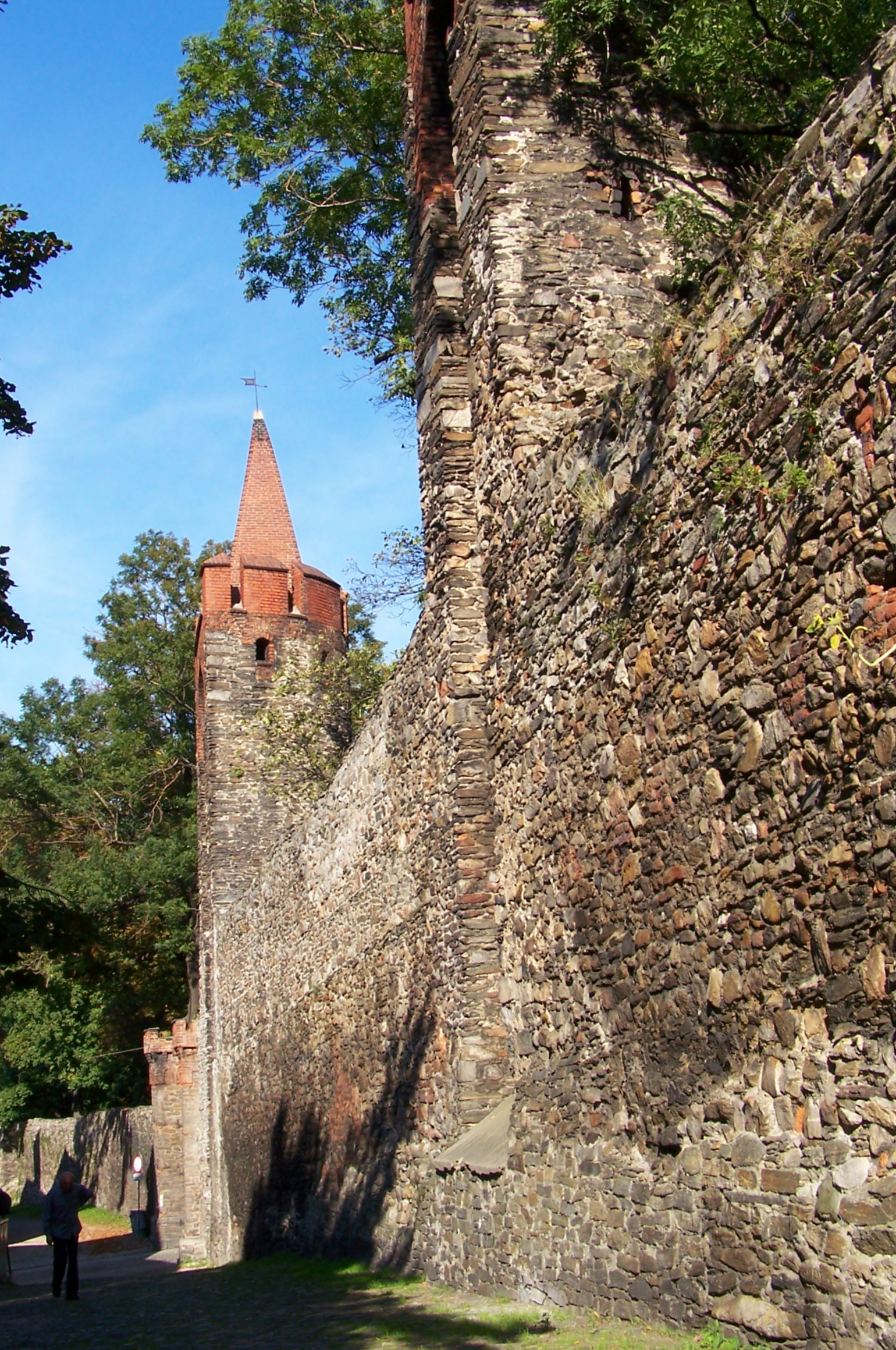
Medieval town walls

Paczków was officially founded and granted town rights on March 8, 1254, when the Polish Bishop of Wrocław, Tomasz I gave permission to two Flemings Henryk and Wilhelm, for the location of a new town Bogunów (mentioned under the Latinized name Bogunov) to be settled by German immigrants. The new town was placed near the ancient village of Paczków and took its name, and henceforth, the name of the village was changed to Stary Paczków ("Old Paczków"). The name Paczków itself comes from the Old Polish male name Pakosław. Paczków, mentioned in medieval documents under the Latinized Old Polish names Paczkaw (Liber fundationis episcopatus Vratislaviensis) and Patzkow (Book of Henryków), quickly grew, becoming not only a market town, but also a stronghold, guarding southwestern borders of the ecclesiastical Duchy of Nysa of fragmented Poland. It was granted the so-called Flemish rights, based on Magdeburg rights. The new town received several privileges, such as the right to brew beer, and its early inhabitants were mostly craftsmen, such as bakers, butchers and shoemakers.

In the Late Middle Ages and subsequent periods, Paczków shared the stormy fate of other towns of Silesia, with frequent disasters, such as hunger (1325), floods (1333, 1501, 1539, 1560, 1598, 1602), fires (1565, 1634), as well as epidemics - Black Death (1349), and cholera (1603–1607, 1633). During the Hussite Wars, in 1424, an alliance between Piast Duke John I of Ziębice and the towns and estates of Kłodzko Land was forged in the town. The town also suffered during the Hussite Wars, when it was captured by the Hussites on March 17, 1428. The period of religious wars did not end until the late 15th century, and only then did Paczków begin to flourish again. With the financial support of the dukes of Nysa, new fortifications were constructed, with a wall and towers.

In 1526 Paczków, under the Germanized name Patschkau, together with the Duchy of Nysa, passed under the suzerainty of the Austrian Habsburg dynasty. The town blossomed, as a major centre of trade, with several manufacturers of textiles. The end of prosperity came during the Thirty Years' War, when warring armies destroyed Patschkau and adjacent areas. In 1742, after the Silesian Wars, Patschkau was annexed by the Kingdom of Prussia, and it subsequently became part of the German Empire in 1871. It was secularized in 1810.

The town was spared from serious destruction during World War I and II. During World War II, the Germans established five working parties (E158, E164, E274, E504, E534) of the Stalag VIII-B/344 prisoner-of-war camp in the town. In the final stages of the war, the town was captured by the Soviet Red Army in May 1945. Its German population was largely evacuated or expelled. After the war, following the Potsdam Agreement, it became again part of Poland, although with a Soviet-installed communist regime, which stayed in power until the Fall of Communism in the 1980s. Its historic Polish name was restored. The town was repopulated by Polish settlers from war-devastated central Poland and expellees from former eastern Poland annexed by the Soviet Union, mostly from areas of Lwów, Tarnopol, and Volhynia (current western Ukraine). The Polish anti-communist resistance organization Krucjata (Crusade) was based in Paczków.

== Monuments ==
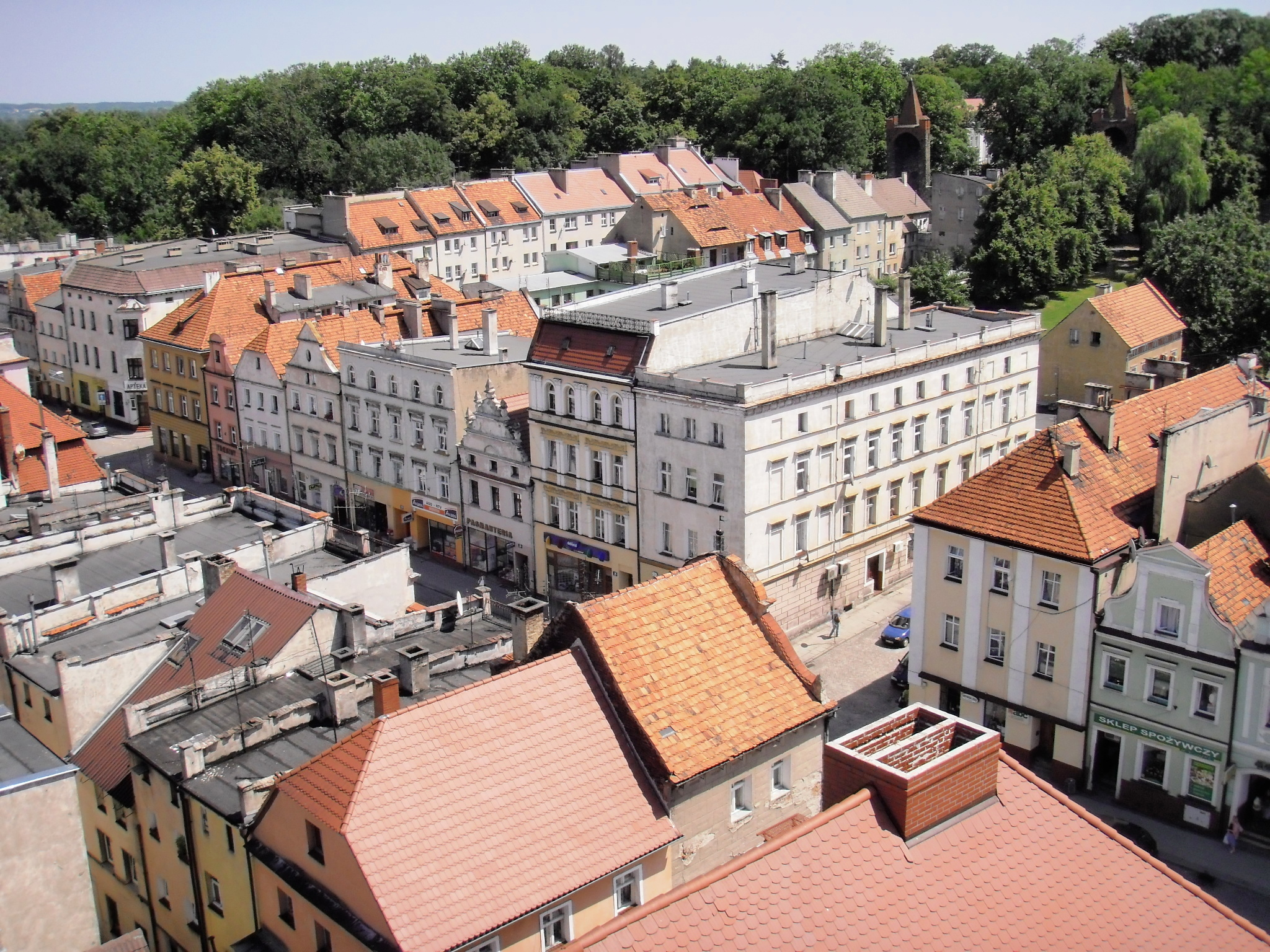
Paczków Old Town

Unlike nearby Nysa, World War II spared Paczków, and most of its monuments have been preserved. Called "The Polish Carcassonne" (or, before the town was reintegrated with Poland, "the Silesian Carcassonne"), as early as in the 15th century, it was surrounded by double ring of defensive walls. Initially, the fortifications were made of dirt and wood, but later they were replaced by mightier stone walls.

The first fortifications of Paczków were built in the mid-14th century upon the order of the Bishop of Wrocław, Przecław of Pogorzela. In the mid 15th century, Paczków had three gates - Wrocław Gate (Brama Wrocławska, eastern), Kłodzko Gate (Brama Kłodzka, western), and Ząbkowice Śląskie Gate (Brama Ząbkowicka, southern). In the second half of the 16th century, the northern Nysa Gate (Brama Nyska) was added. Vertical, 9-metre walls made from stone still surround the historical centre of the town today. Altogether, the fortifications are around 1200 metres long, and apart from four gates, there originally were 24 wall towers, out of which 19 have been preserved. Along the defensive walls, there was a moat, which has been turned into a recreational park.

Besides its fortifications, Paczków is famous for renaissance, baroque, and neoclassic tenement houses, which surround the town square. The oldest of these buildings date back to around 1500, with the most visible being the so-called "House of the Executioner". Also, in the centre of Paczków, there is the town hall, with a 48-metre-high (157 ft) tower.

Another interesting monument of "Polish Carcassonne" is the Church of John the Evangelist, which is considered to be one of the most impressive fortified churches in Poland. Its construction began in 1350, and lasted for 30 years. The unique Gothic church, which is made of stone and bricks displays a renaissance attic, and its mighty structure has been incorporated into the town's fortifications. The church stands out because of its immense size, and inside there are sculptures attributed to Wit Stwosz. Next to the complex there is the so-called Tatar well. According to a legend, a Tatar warrior (see Mongol invasion of Poland) was thrown into the well, after he had captured the daughter of a wealthy inhabitant of Paczków.

== Economy ==
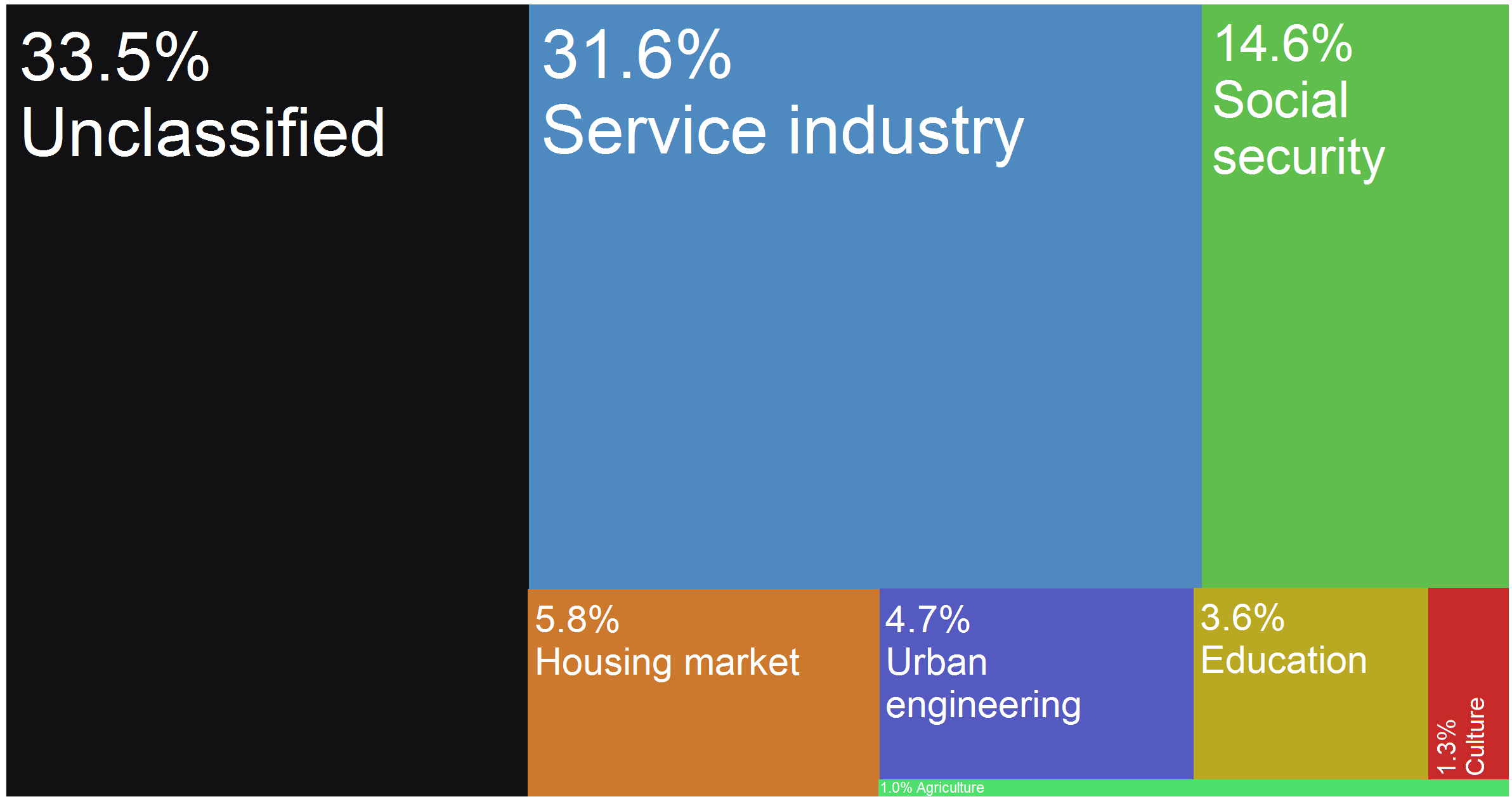
Paczków city budget's income sources as of 2015

The characteristics of the town of Paczków's economic dependence is similar to that of the Gmina Paczków and the whole of the Opole Voivodeship, agriculture. The gmina, under the local authority of the town has a total of 6193 ha used for agriculture (80% of its land), with the main crop being canola.

To the west of Paczków, the Paczkowski Lake, while predominantly performing the role of protecting the locality from flooding, is also home to a small fishing industry. Apart from food production, Paczków is home to numerous heavy industry complexes, including the "EMSTEEL" steel plant by Robotnicza Street (ul. Robotnicza) and the "Pollena Paczków" chemicals manufacturing plant by Henryk Sienkiewicz Street (ul. Henryka Sienkiewicza). Withal, in 2015 the service industry (including manual labour) provided 31.6% (11.7 million złoty) to the city's budget.

== Transport ==
The town is served by Paczków railway station.

== Notable people ==
- Joseph Schröter (1837–1894), German scientist
- Lucyna Matuszna (born 1961), Polish female field hockey player
- Izabela Zatorska (born 1962), Polish retired female mountain runner
- Paweł Kukiz (born 1963), Polish politician, singer and actor
- Krzysztof Maksel (born 1991), Polish male cyclist

== Twin towns – sister cities ==
See twin towns of Gmina Paczków.

== Gallery ==
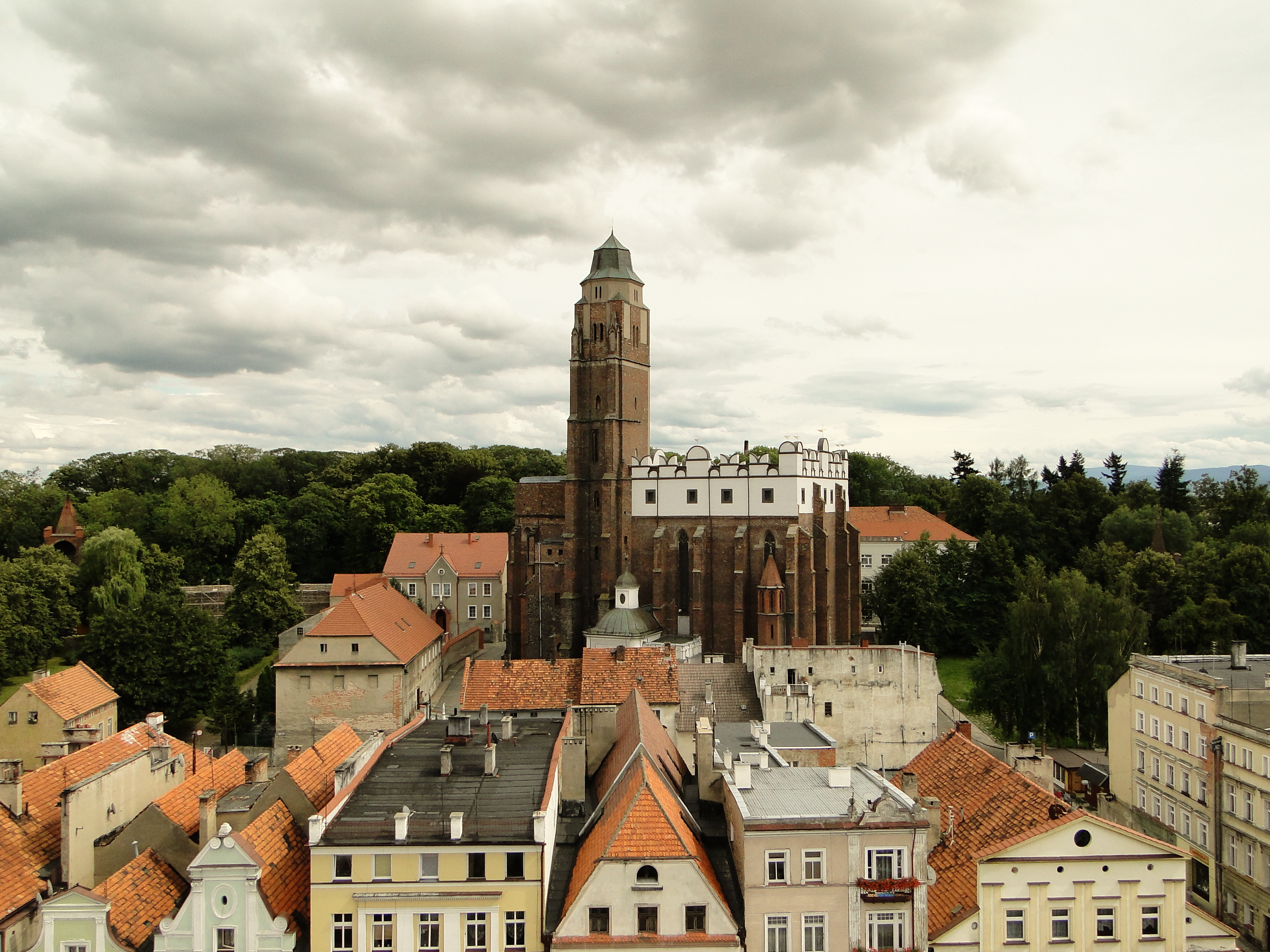
Town centre

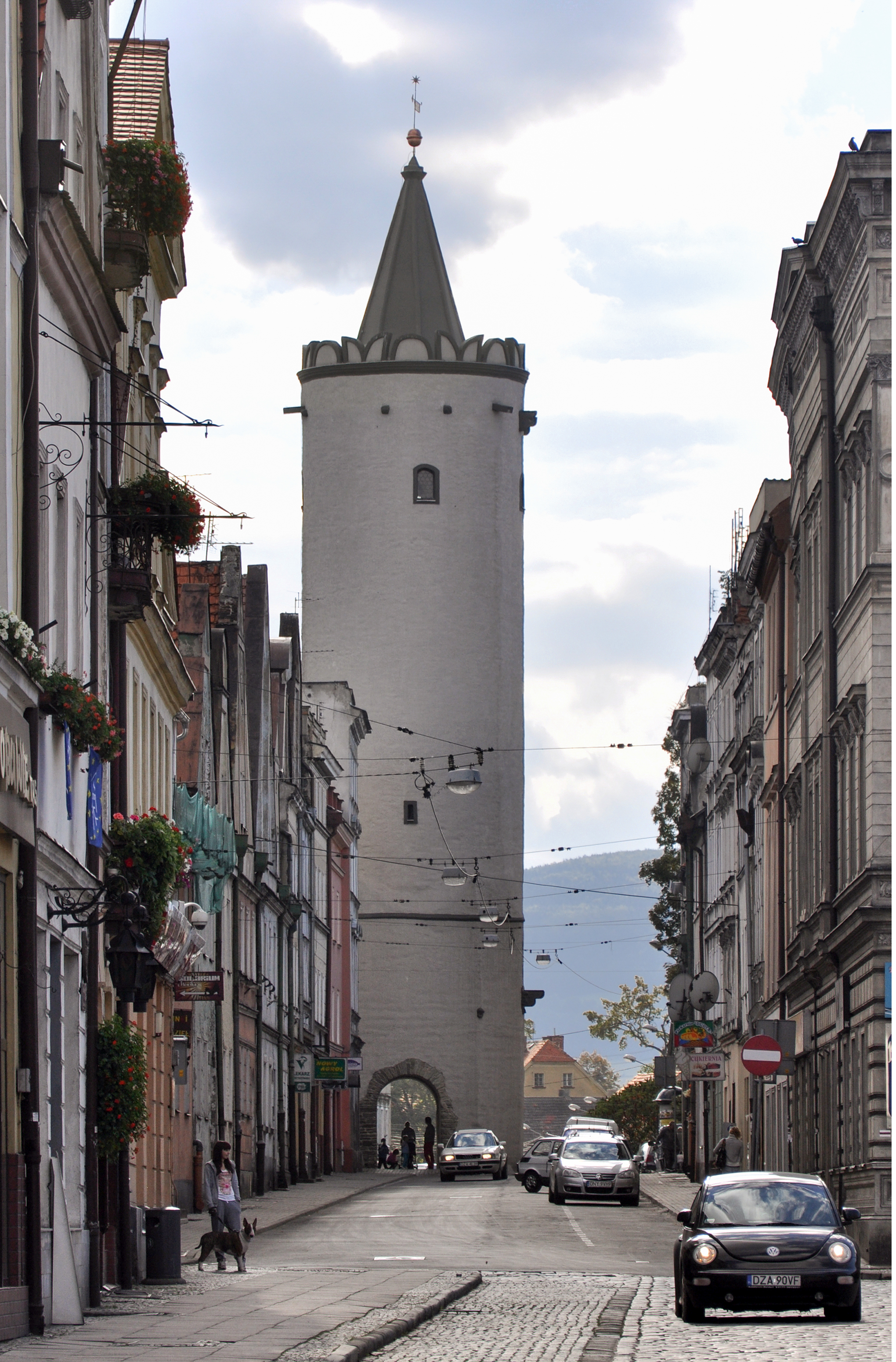
Kłodzko Gate

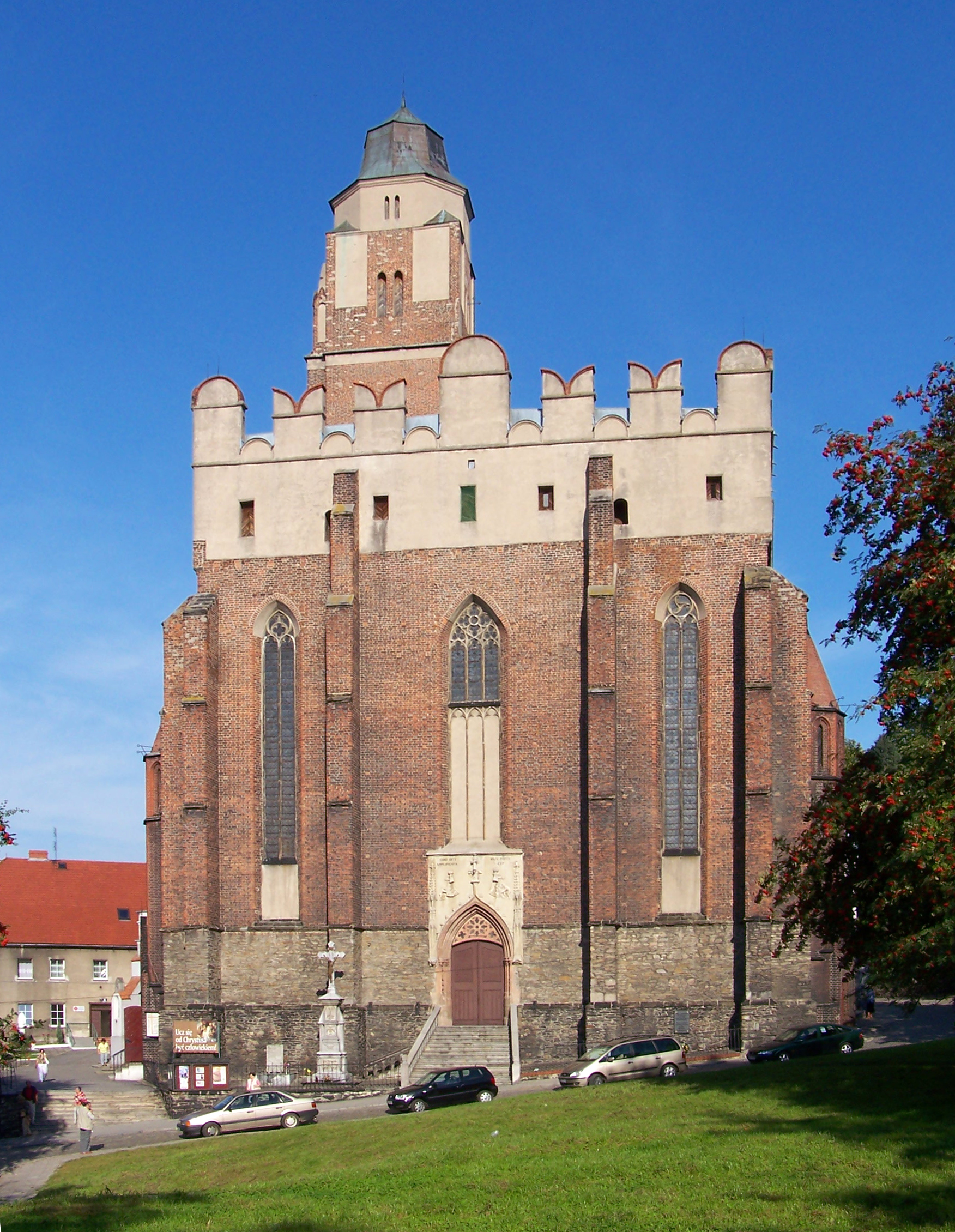
Church of John the Evangelist

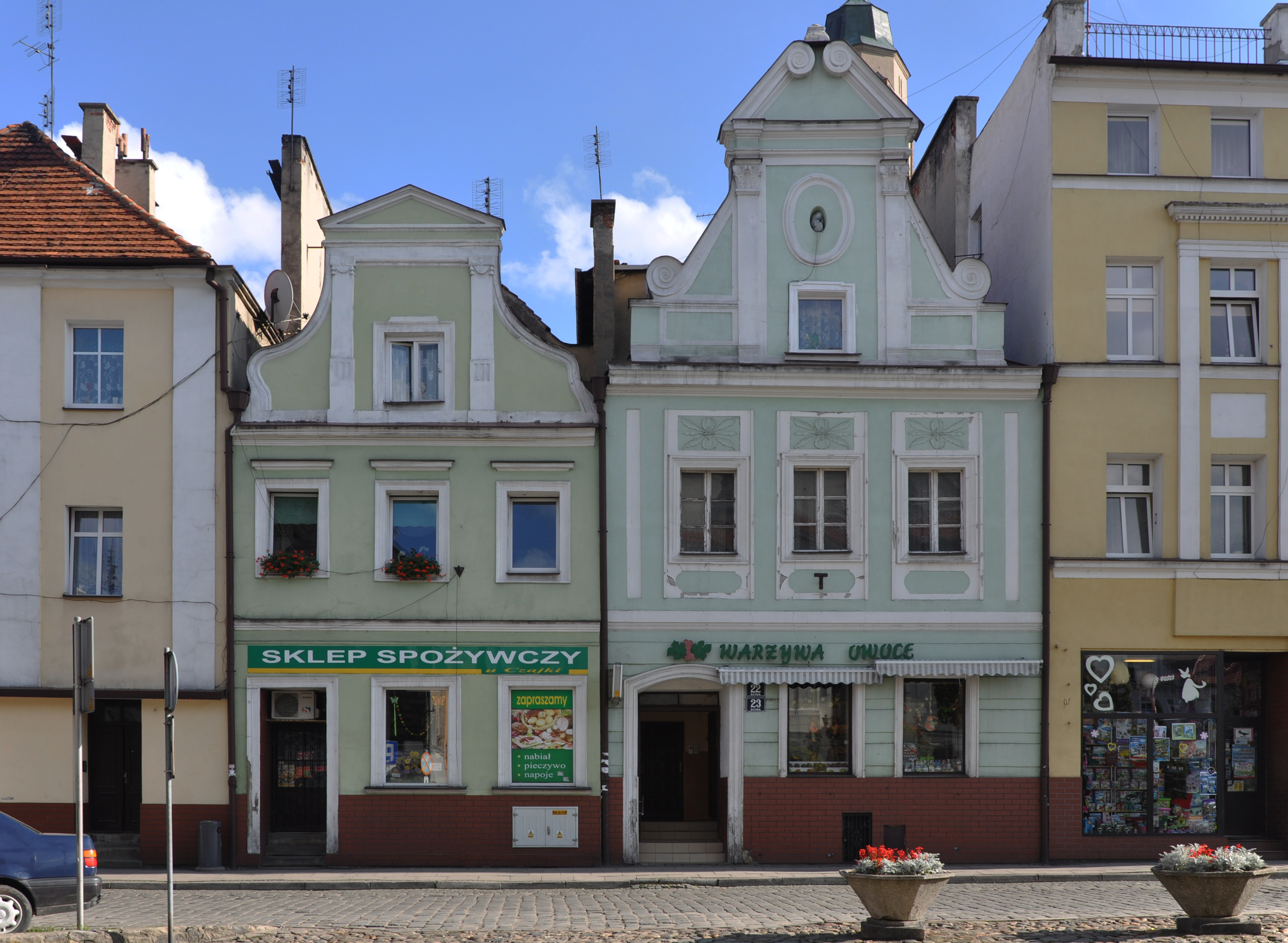
Historic townhouses

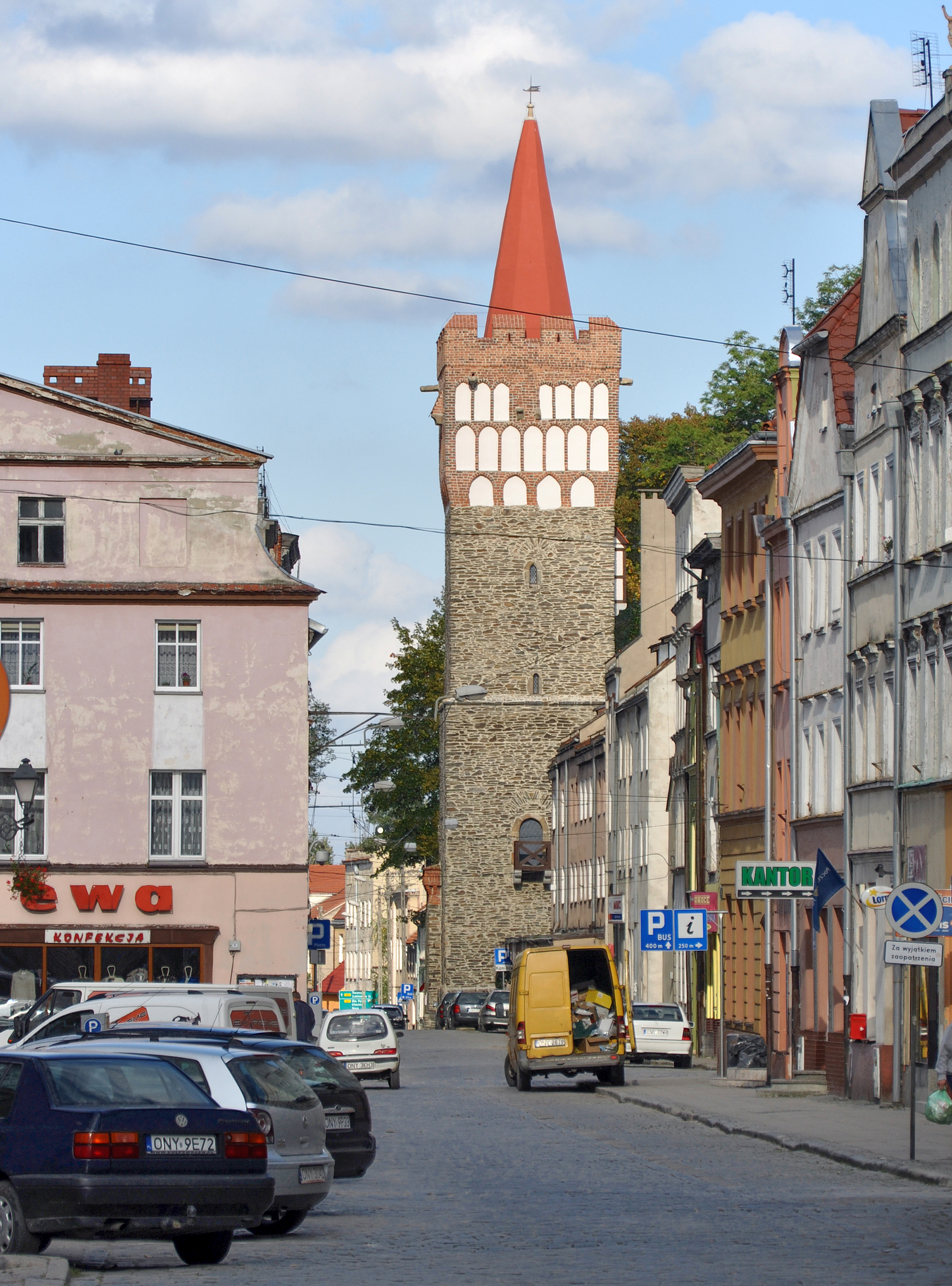
Wrocław Gate

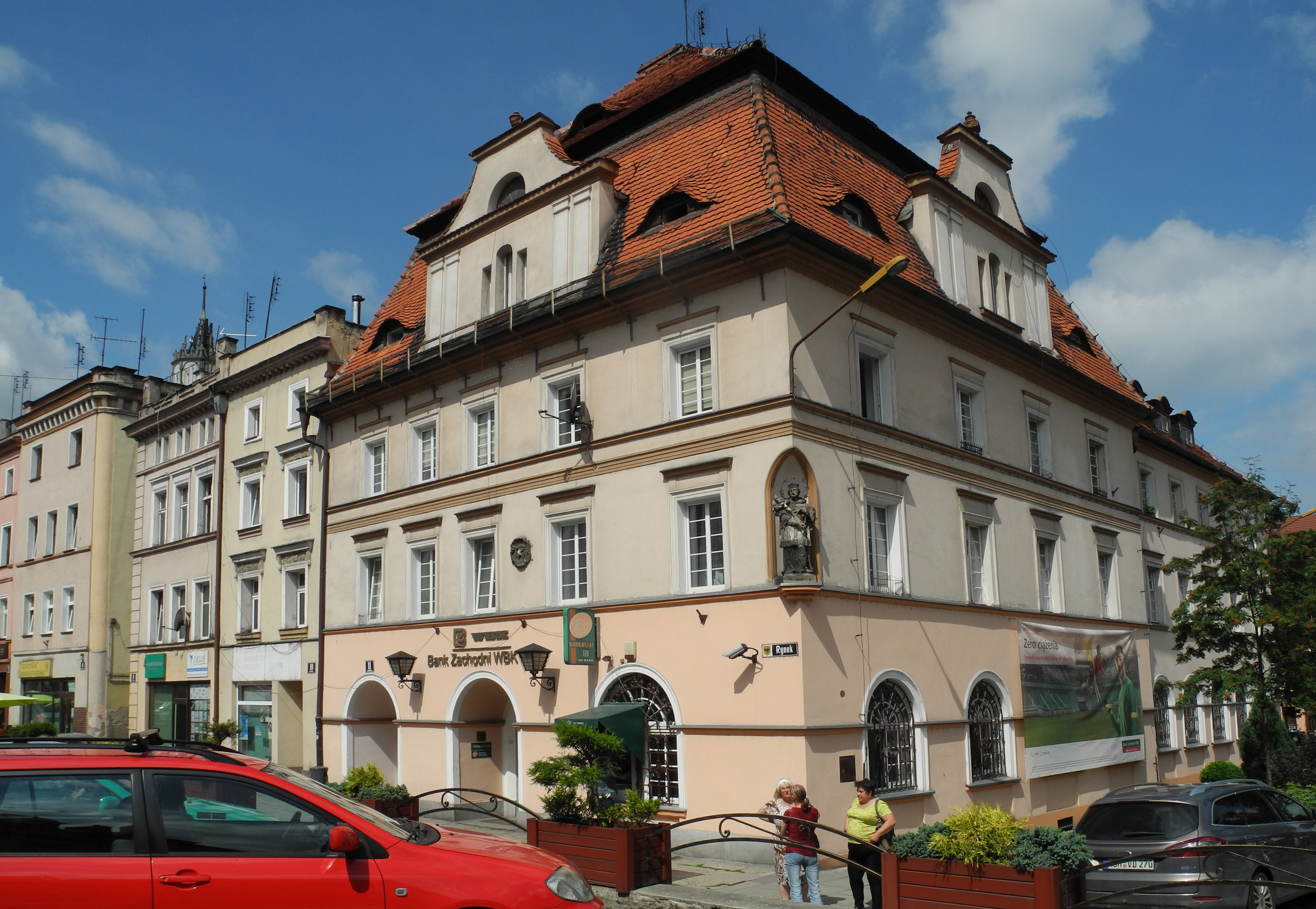
Market square

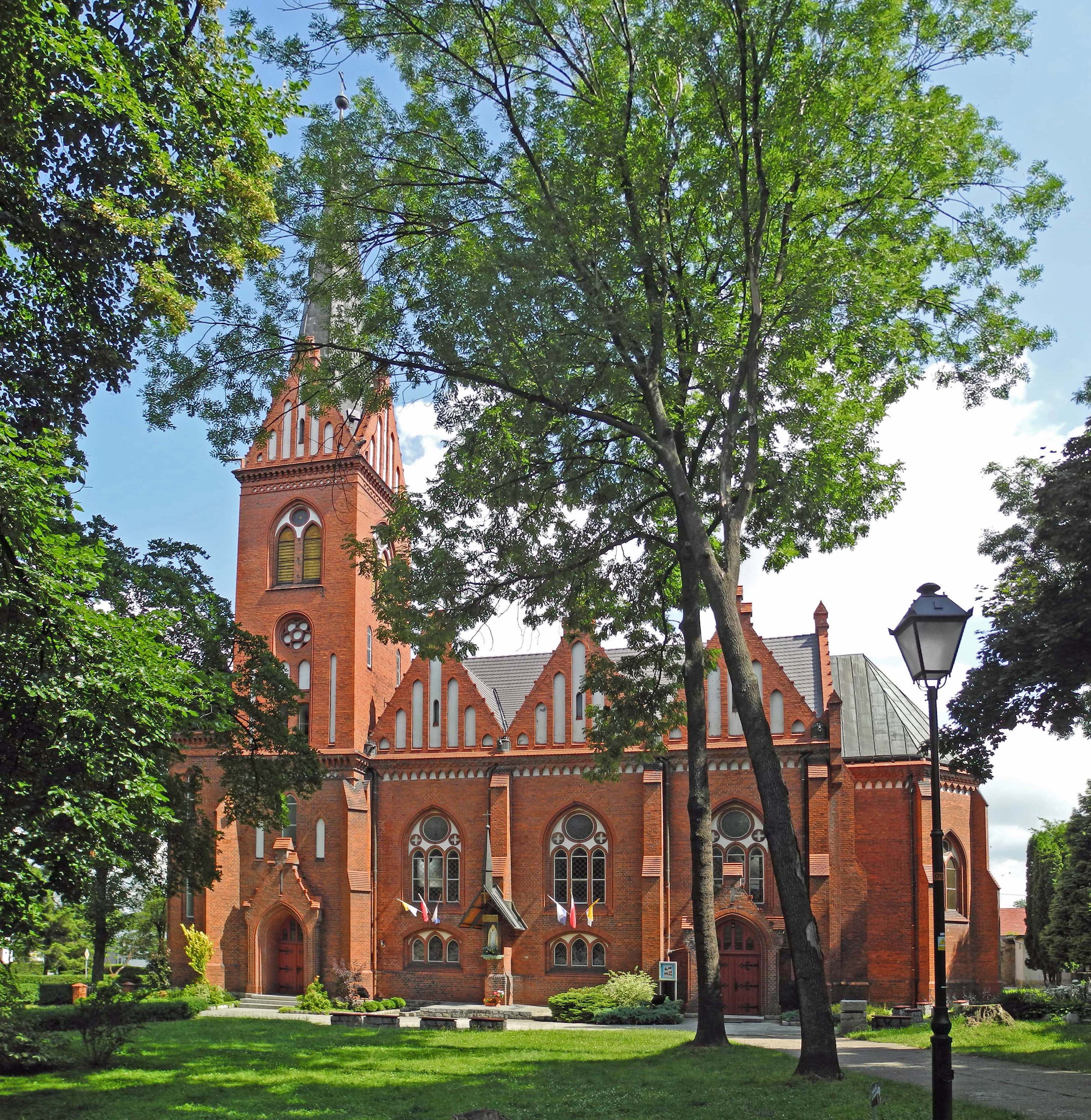
Church of Our Lady of Perpetual Help

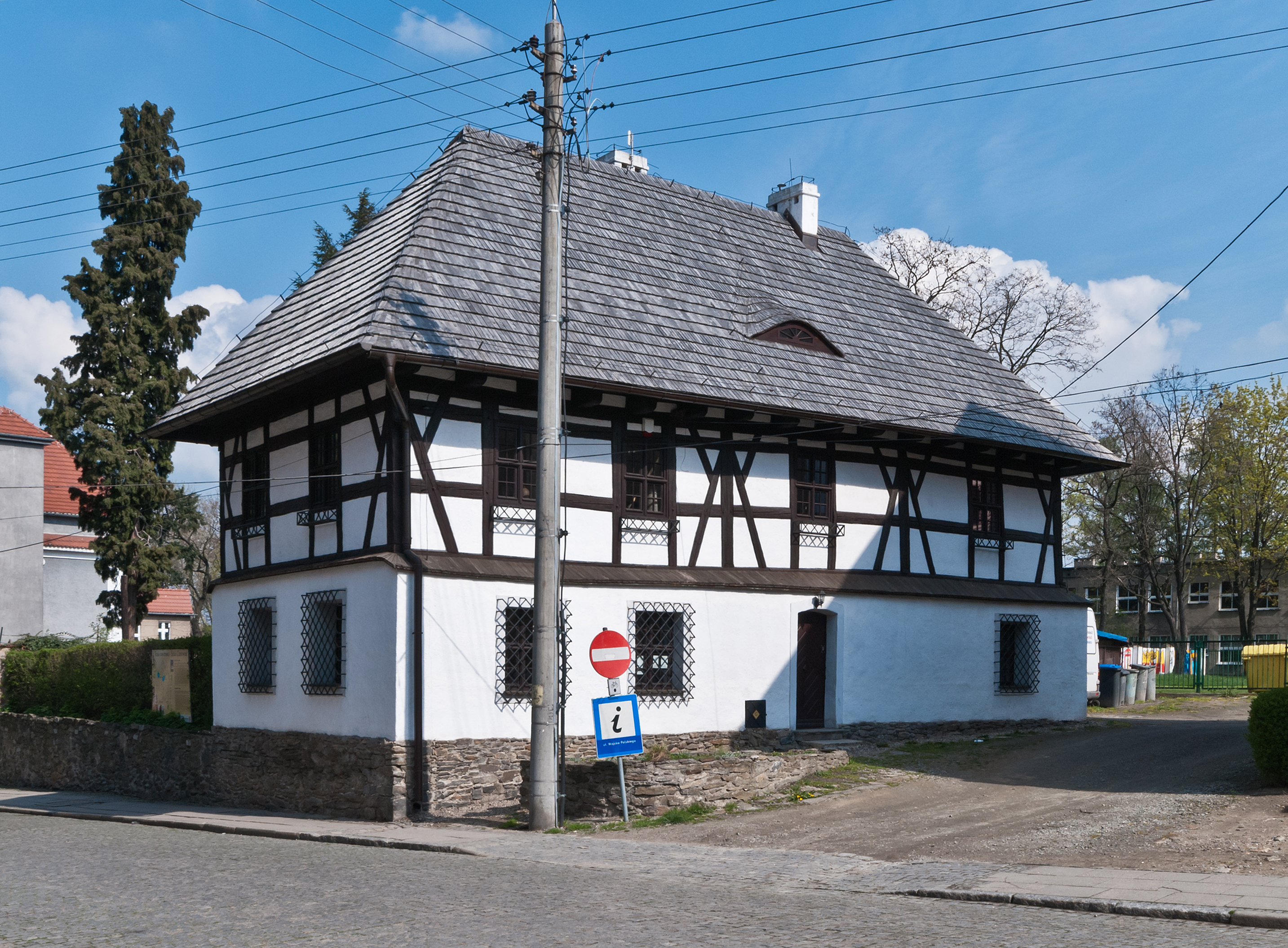
Executioner's house, 18th century
