= Nysa–Kałków Łąka railway =

Railway line in Poland

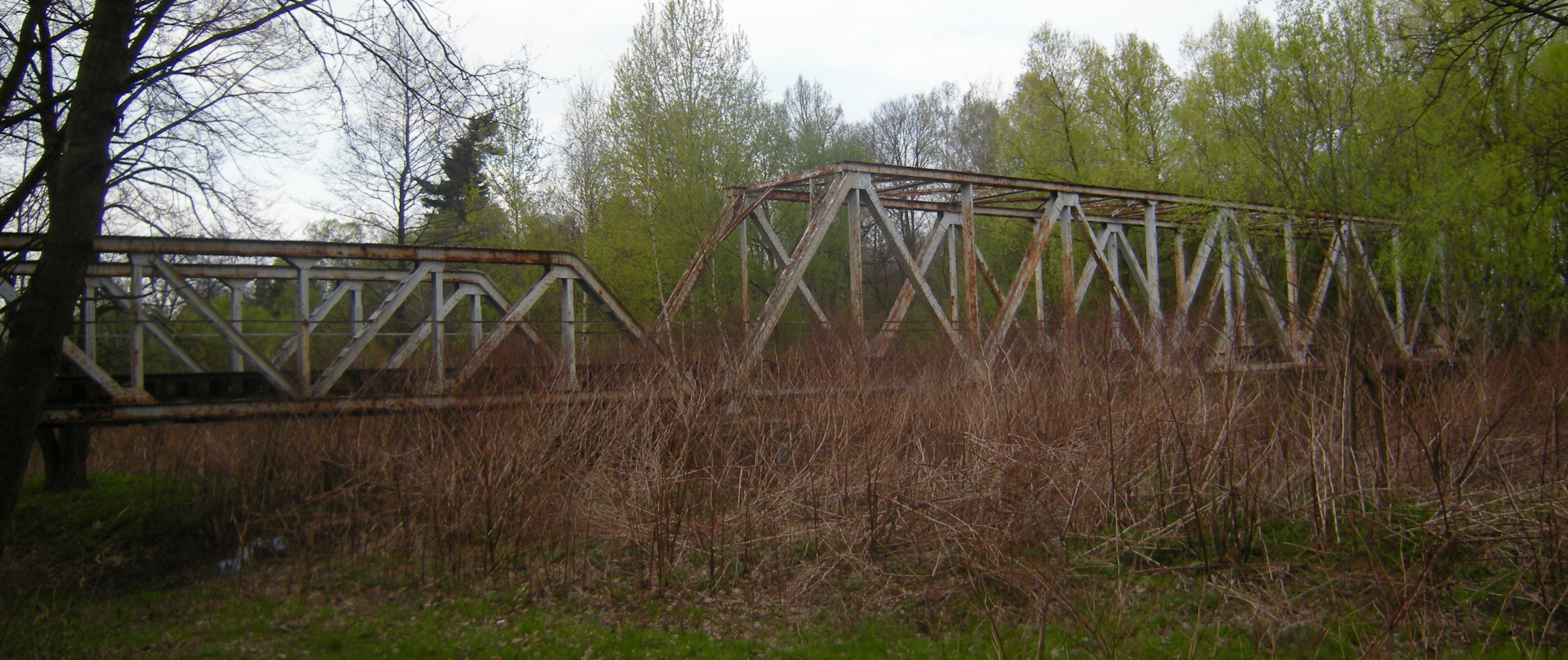
- Abandoned railway bridge near Biała Nyska in 2011

Overview
- Status: Defunct
- Owner: Neisser Kreisbahn AG; PKP PLK
- Locale: Poland
- Termini: Nysa Miasto; Kałków Łąka
- Connecting lines: Sudeten Main Line
- Former connections: Velká Kraš – Vidnava raiway
- Stations: 8

Service
- Type: Heavy rail
- Route number: 328
- Rolling stock: Prussian T 3

History
- Opened: 5 November 1911
- Closed: 1st January 1991

Technical
- Line length: 19.2 km (11.9 mi)
- Number of tracks: Single track
- Track gauge: 1,435 mm (4 ft 8 1/2 in) standard gauge
- Operating speed: 30 km/h (19 mph)

The Nysa–Kałków Łąka railway is a defunct 19.2 km (11.9 mi) long railway in Poland that was part of the Neisse district railway, connecting the city of Nysa and two villages of Kałków and Łąka, and also connecting Vidnava in the Czech Republic, the railway later became a branchline. The railway opened in 1911, the Kałków Łąka–Vidnava part was dismantled in 1945, the railway joined in Nysa railway station in 1951, passenger traffic was ceased in 1974 and the railway closed in 1991.

The railway used to be numbered 127 according to D29 from 1949, the number changed to 257 in 1971, and changed to the current number 328 in 1985 where its current number is still used after the closure.

== Route ==
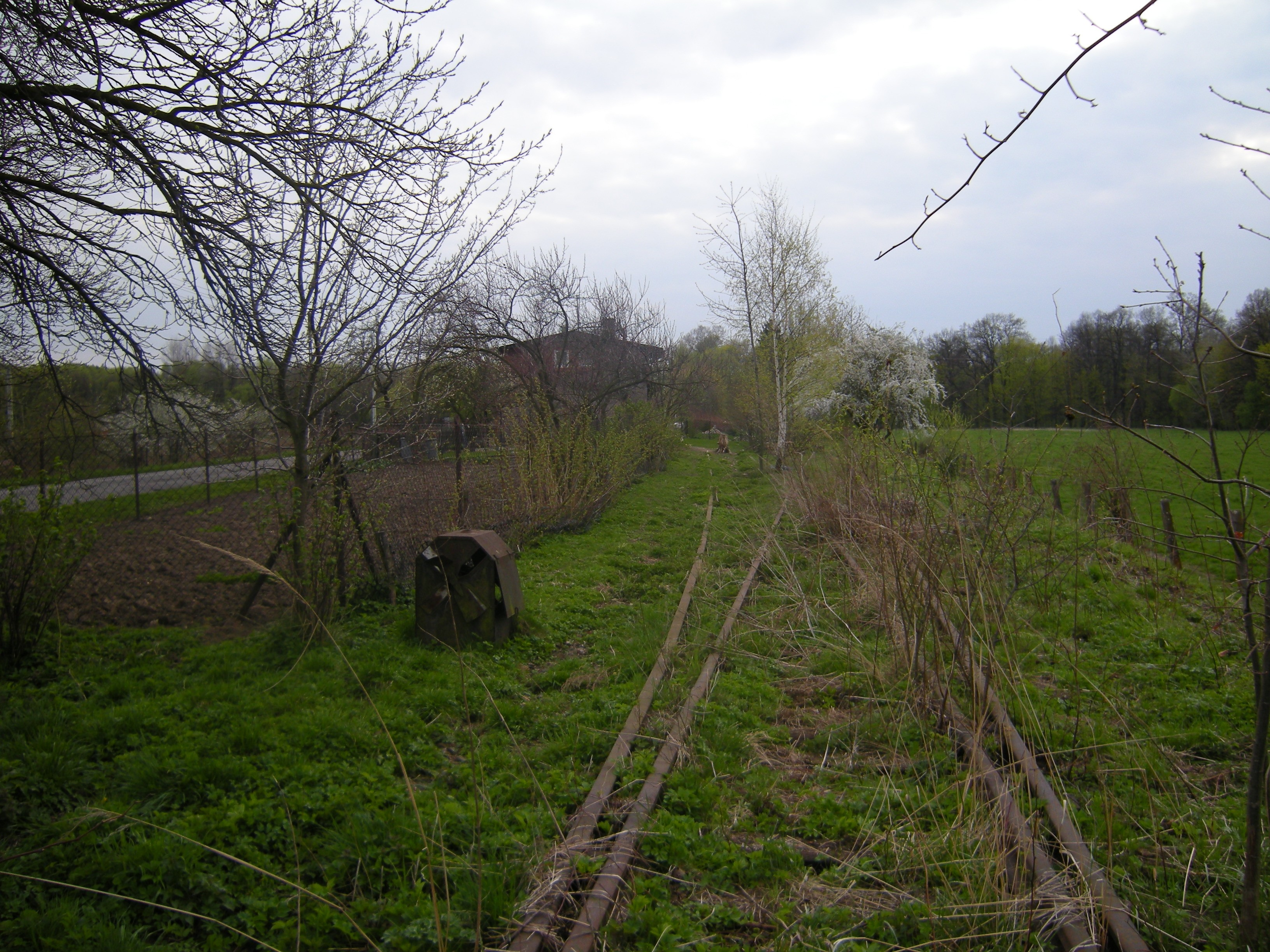
Abandoned Biała Nyska station with remaining tracks in 2011

The line starts at Nysa Miasto railway station next to Nysa railway station in Nysa, where it goes along the Sudeten Main Line heading south, the line passes Nysa Dworzec Mały railway station (0.9 km of the line), crosses Karol Świerczewski street (Marshal Józef Piłsudski street), passes Nysa Górna Wieś station (2.4 km of the line) and exits the city of Nysa. The line shifts south south west upon entering the village of Podkamień, passes Podkamień railway station (4.7 km of the line) and crosses the road to Głuchołazy, after leaving the village the line heads west to Biała Nyska, where upon entering the village the line crosses both Nyska streets and shifts south west, eventually passing Biała Nyska railway station (7.8 km of the line).

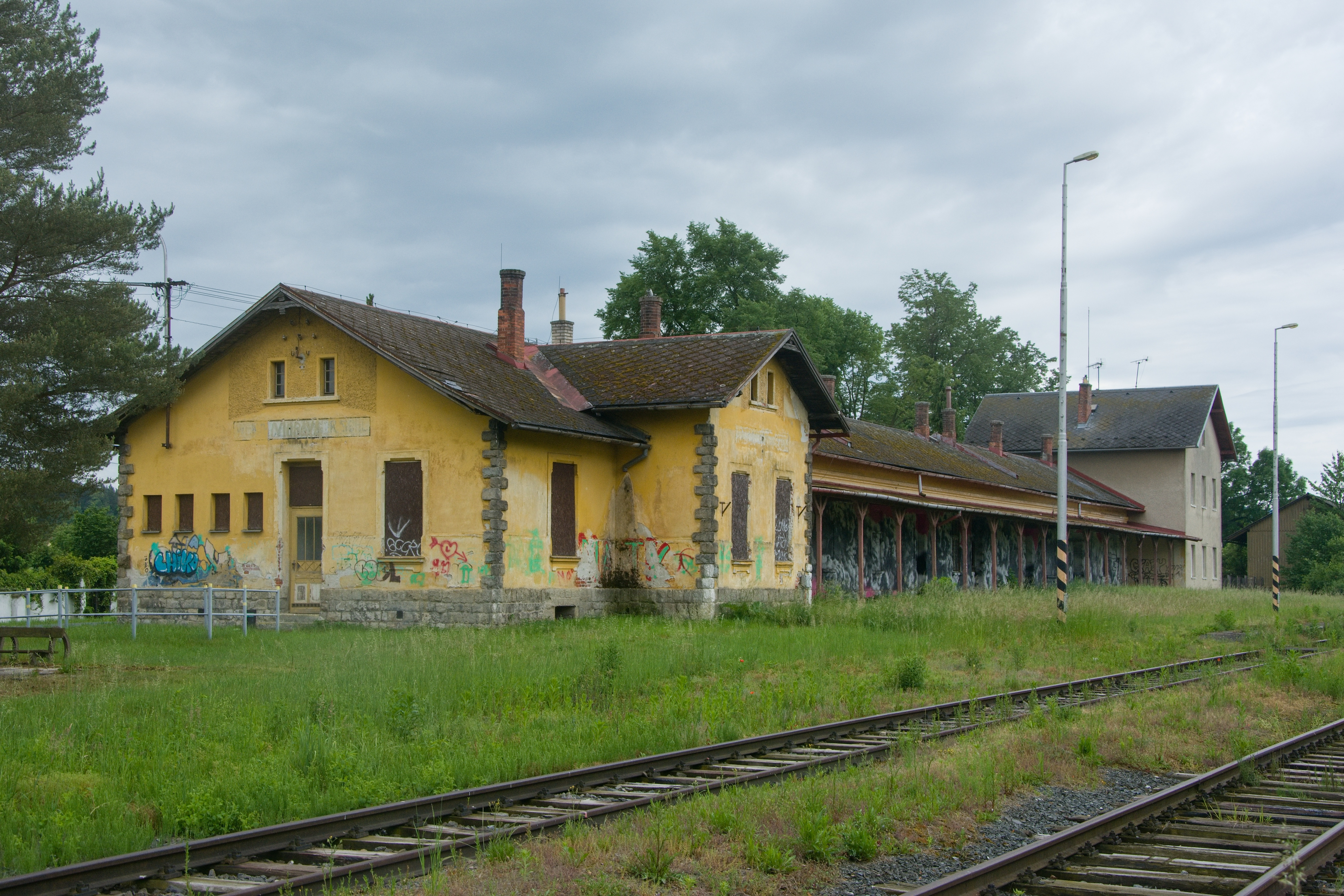
Closed Vidnava railway station in 2024, the railway used to end there.

The line keeps going south west and crosses Biała Głuchołaska river, the line changes direction to Koperniki where it passes Koperniki railway station (10.2 km of the line) and also crosses a road. The line then heads to Buków where it passes Buków Jodłów station (13.7 km of the line), crosses a road to Jodłów and shifts south west again. The line heads to Kałków Łąka where it shifts direction south south west and stops at Kałków Łąka railway station (16.2 km of the line). However, the line doesn't end there, as it crosses the Czech–Polish border and crosses the Vidnavka river, the line ends at Vidnava railway station on the Velká Kraš–Vidnava branchline in Vidnava.

The route was changed in 1951 at Nysa where the line no longer started at Nysa Miasto station and instead started at Nysa railway station, becoming the branch line on the Sudeten Main Line.

== History ==
Österreichische Lokaleisenbahngesellschaft (ÖLEG) in the concession granted for the construction of the Hannsdorf–Ziegenhals (Hanušovice–Głuchołazy) railway line had a condition stipulated on the construction of a cross-border railway connection in Barzdorf (Bernartice) and Groß Kunzendorf (Velké Kunětice), this was granted in a state treaty between the German Empire and Austria-Hungary on 14th March 1885 for establishing several railway connections, the commitment was the taken by the country in 1893. The Ottmachau–Heinersdorf (Otmuchów–Dziewiętlice) railway opened on 1st November 1893, while the construction of Nieder Lindewiese–Barzdorf (Lipová-lázně–Bernartice) railway began on 20th December 1894. The Nieder Lindewiese–Barzdorf railway opened on 2nd July 1896 and the branch lines to Weidenau from Haugsdorf (Vidnava from Hukovice) and Jauernig from Barzdorf (Javornik from Bernartice) opened in 1897, where traffic began on 6th September of that year.

The plans to build a cross-border connection in Groß Kunzendorf ended with discussions, as per the concession. It was agreed to build a cross-border connection in Weidenau, as the terrain conditions in Weidenau were suitable enough. The Prussian State, the district of Neisse as well as other municipalities and interested parties, and Lenz & Co. GmbH company, founded Neisser Kreisbahn AG company on 20 April 1910, as with the agreement for the construction of the cross-border railway connection in Weidenau, the Neisse–Weidenau railway opened on 5 November 1911 built by Lenz & Co. and began its international service between Neisse and Haugsdorf.

Since the railway opened, the railway was managed by Lenz & Co. company, the Weidenau–Haugsdorf part was managed by kkStB. This state lasted until 1923, when ČSD took over the Weidenau–Haugsdorf part. The railway had similar reasons and conditions of transport. The Frývaldov District had a number of German minorities, similar were the types of transported goods. The railway was damaged by the flood in 1938.

On 1st November 1945 the Kałków Łąka–Vidnava part was dismantled, as it saw no interest of international rail transport, the passenger traffic on the Nysa–Biała Nyska part was reactivated in May 1947, and on the Biała Nyska–Kałków Łąka part was reactivated 2 years later. The railway was integrated with the central station in 1951 for easier access to the railway, becoming a branch line on the Sudeten Main Line. The railway was closed for passenger traffic on 1 January 1974 and was closed for freight traffic on 1 January 1991. It was decided to dismantle the railway on 1 January 1992, with the railway being dismantled a year later.

== Service ==
=== Passenger ===
The railway saw 4 passenger trains operating each day in May 1914. The journey between Neisse Stadt and Weidenau took between 55 minutes and 1 hour.

The railway saw 5 passenger trains operating each day in 1943 and 1944.

After the war, PKP took over the railway. the railway had a train that did not operate until 1947, the train numbered 98 between Nysa and Vidnava. Despite the terminus being on the Czechoslovak side, the railway connection between Kałków Łąka and Vidnava was dismantled. The train became operational in October, only terminating at Biała nyska, the train then changed its terminus to Kałków Łąka in 1949 with the number changed to 212c.

The railway saw 2 passenger trains between 1949 and 1964, and 4 passenger trains between 1965 and 1974 operating each day.

=== Freight ===
The railway relied mostly on bulk goods, having granite quarries in Nadziejów and Kamienna Góra and a sand mine in Łąka, it also relied with transporting goods from Austria.

Granite was transported from the granite quarries in Kamienna Góra and Nadziejów, Koperniki station used to have a narrow gauge railway connecting both quarries, which was used to deliver granite from both quarries to the station. The narrow gauge railway was 4.2 km long, and the branchline leading to the Nadziejów quarry was 1 km long. few traces from the narrow gauge railway are visible today.

Sand was transported from the sand mine near Łąka via a branchline.

The railway relied on freight transport from Austria, including limestone and stone, where they came from quarries near Friedeberg (Žulová), Setzdorf (Vápenná) and Nieder Lindewiese.

== Rolling stock ==
The railway used mostly Prussian T 3 locomotives from Neisse, the locomotives were used for passenger and freight traffic on the railway, passenger trains from the railway consisted of one T3 locomotive, one mail coach and one or two passenger coaches. After the war, the railway used locomotives from Nysa railway depot.
