= Sarnowice =

- Village
- Location within Poland
- Coordinates: 50°28′41″N 17°8′10″E
- Country: Poland
- Voivodeship: Opole
- County: Nysa
- Gmina: Otmuchów
- Population: 270

Sarnowice [sarnɔˈvit͡sɛ] (German: Sarlowitz) is a village in the administrative district of Gmina Otmuchów, within Nysa County, Opole Voivodeship, in south-western Poland, close to the Czech border.
