= Grądy, Opole Voivodeship =

Grądy
- Village
- Location within Poland
- Coordinates: 50°29′59″N 17°13′9″E
- Country: Poland
- Voivodeship: Opole
- County: Nysa
- Gmina: Otmuchów
- Population: 160

Grądy [ˈɡrɔndɨ] (German: Perschkenstein) is a village in the administrative district of Gmina Otmuchów, within Nysa County, Opole Voivodeship, in south-western Poland, close to the Czech border.
