= Wójcice, Opole Voivodeship =

Wójcice
- Village
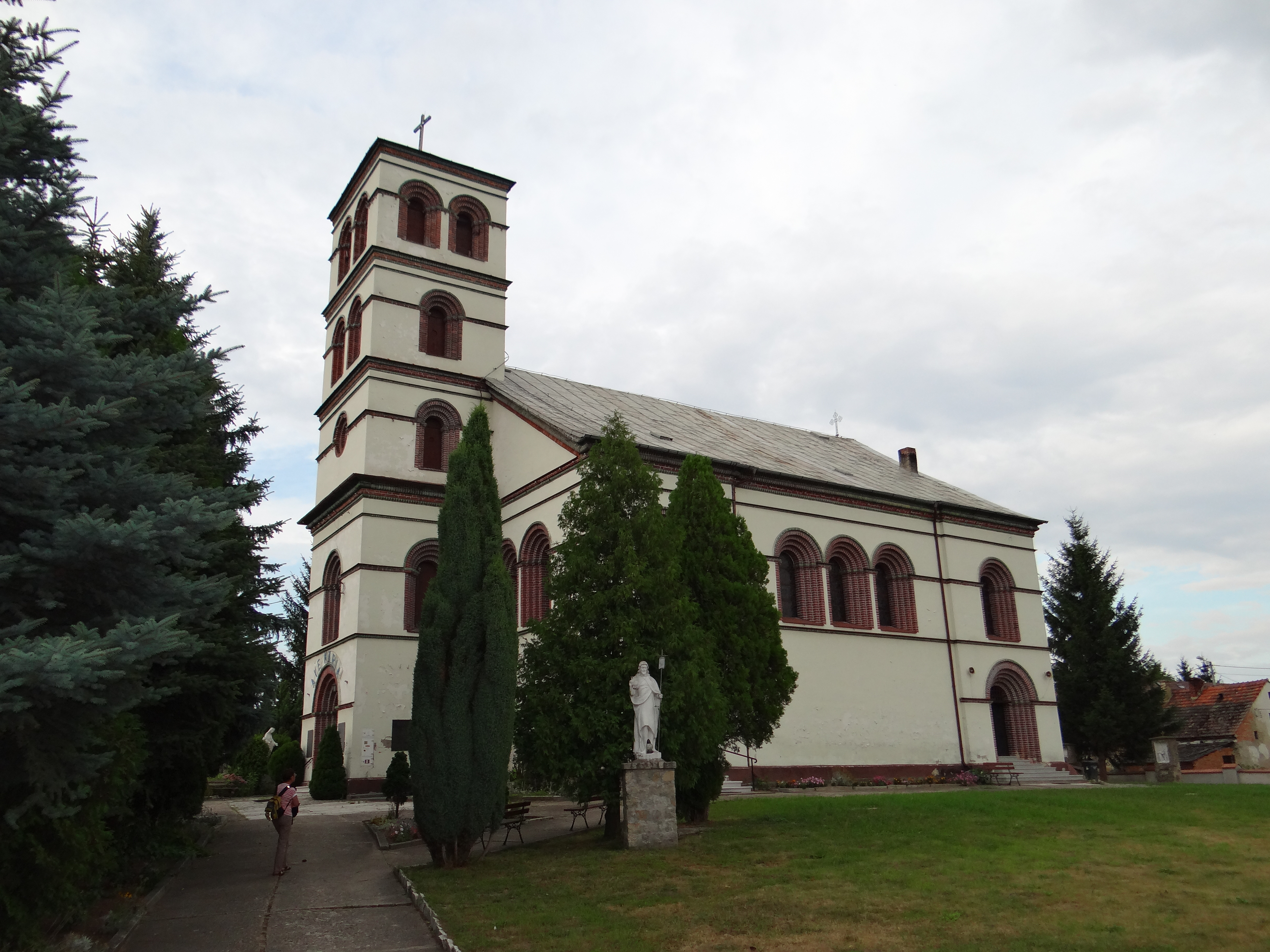
- Catholic church

- Location within Poland
- Coordinates: 50°27′45″N 17°12′44″E
- Country: Poland
- Voivodeship: Opole
- County: Nysa
- Gmina: Otmuchów
- Elevation: 200 m (660 ft)
- Population: 860

Wójcice [vui̯ˈt͡ɕit͡sɛ] (German: Woitz) is a village in the administrative district of Gmina Otmuchów, within Nysa County, Opole Voivodeship, in south-western Poland, close to the Czech border.
