= Lubiatów, Opole Voivodeship =

Lubiatów
- Village
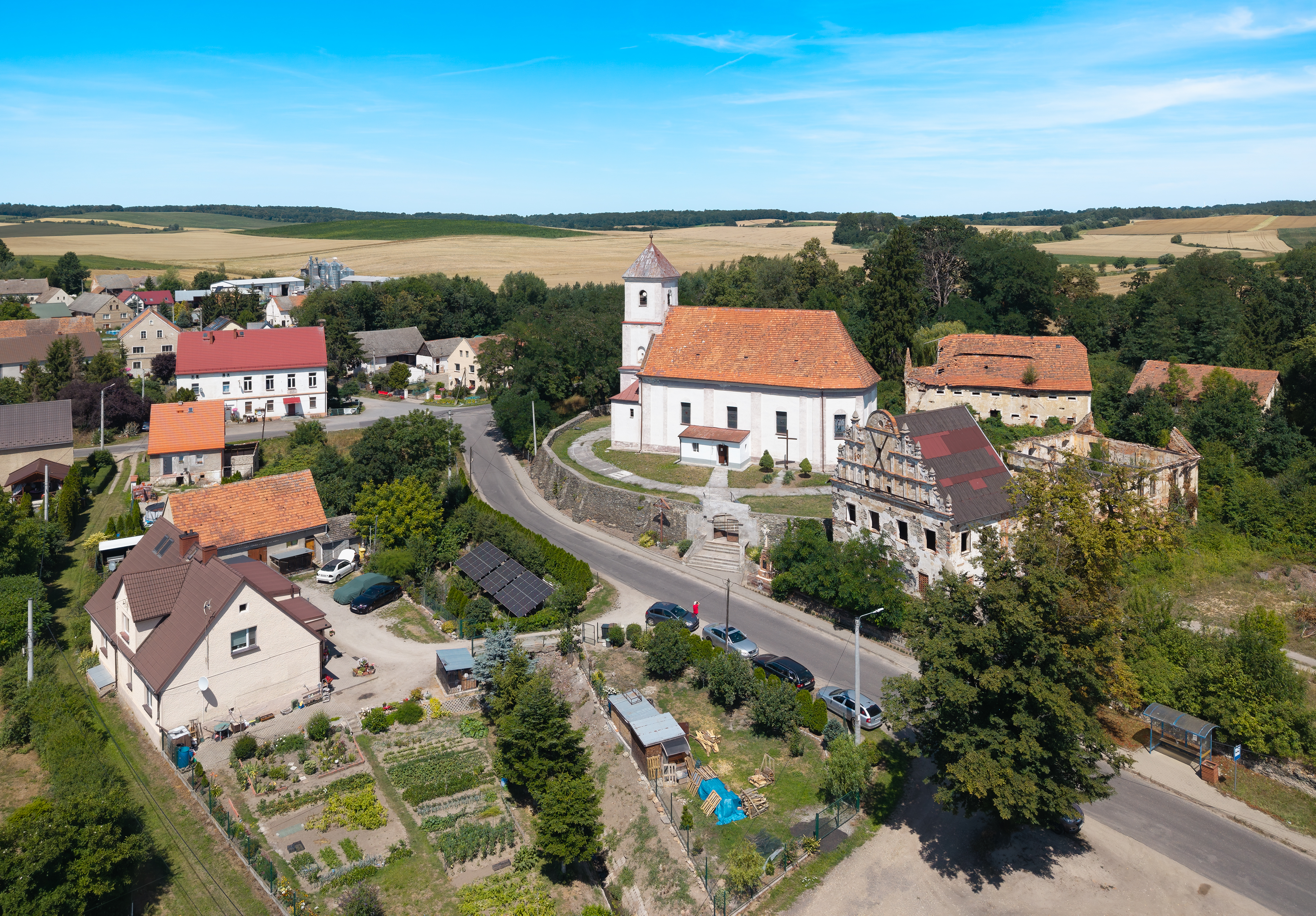

- Location within Poland
- Coordinates: 50°29′53″N 17°4′23″E
- Country: Poland
- Voivodeship: Opole
- County: Nysa
- Gmina: Otmuchów
- Population: 280

Lubiatów [luˈbjatuf] (German: Lobedau) is a village in the administrative district of Gmina Otmuchów, within Nysa County, Opole Voivodeship, in south-western Poland, close to the Czech border.
