= Nieradowice =

- Village
- Location within Poland
- Coordinates: 50°29′17″N 17°10′13″E
- Country: Poland
- Voivodeship: Opole
- County: Nysa
- Gmina: Otmuchów
- Population: 260

Nieradowice [ɲɛradɔˈvit͡sɛ] (German: Nitterwitz) is a village in the administrative district of Gmina Otmuchów, within Nysa County, Opole Voivodeship, in south-western Poland, close to the Czech border.
