= Ligota Wielka, Nysa County =

Ligota Wielka
- Village
- Location within Poland
- Coordinates: 50°29′16″N 17°6′38″E
- Country: Poland
- Voivodeship: Opole
- County: Nysa
- Gmina: Otmuchów
- Population: 340

Ligota Wielka [liˈɡɔta ˈvjɛlka] (German: Ellguth) is a village in the administrative district of Gmina Otmuchów, within Nysa County, Opole Voivodeship, in south-western Poland, close to the Czech border.
