= Kijów, Opole Voivodeship =

Kijów
- Village
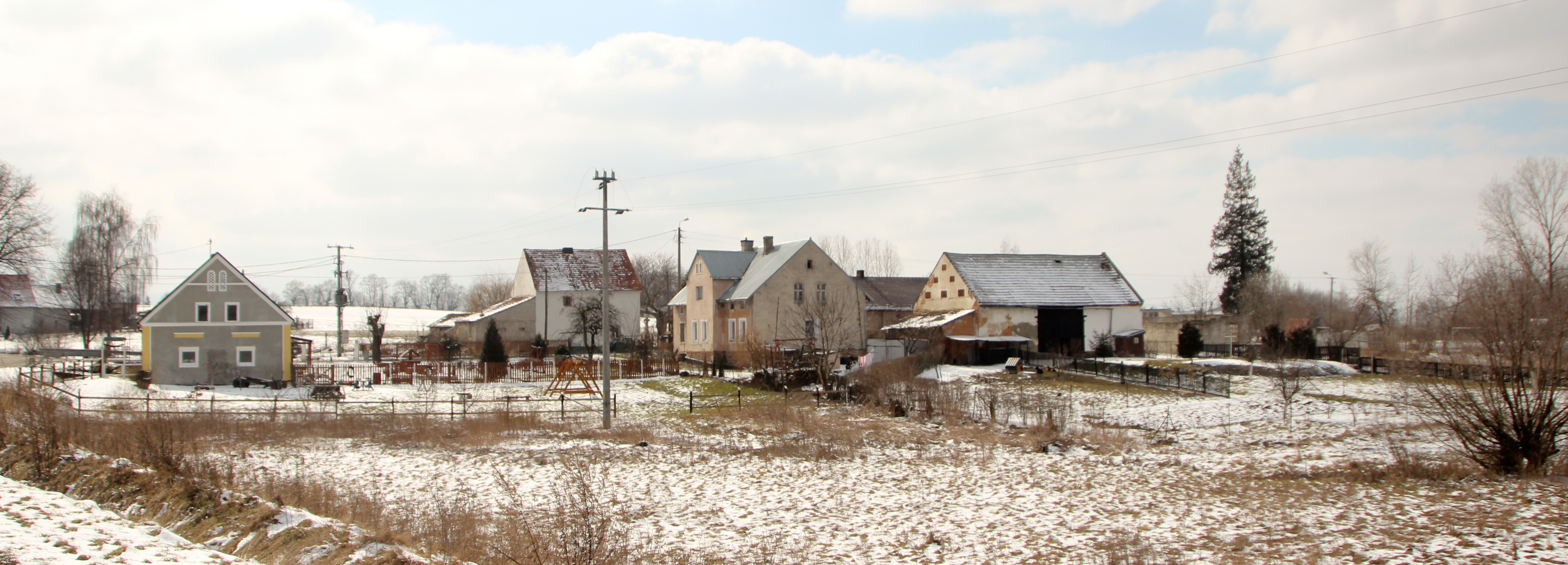

- Location within Poland
- Coordinates: 50°22′15″N 17°15′31″E
- Country: Poland
- Voivodeship: Opole
- County: Nysa
- Gmina: Otmuchów
- Population: 290

Kijów (Polish pronunciation: [ˈkʲijuf], German: Kaindorf) is a village in the administrative district of Gmina Otmuchów, within Nysa County, Opole Voivodeship, in south-western Poland, close to the Czech border.
