= Jarnołtów =

- Village
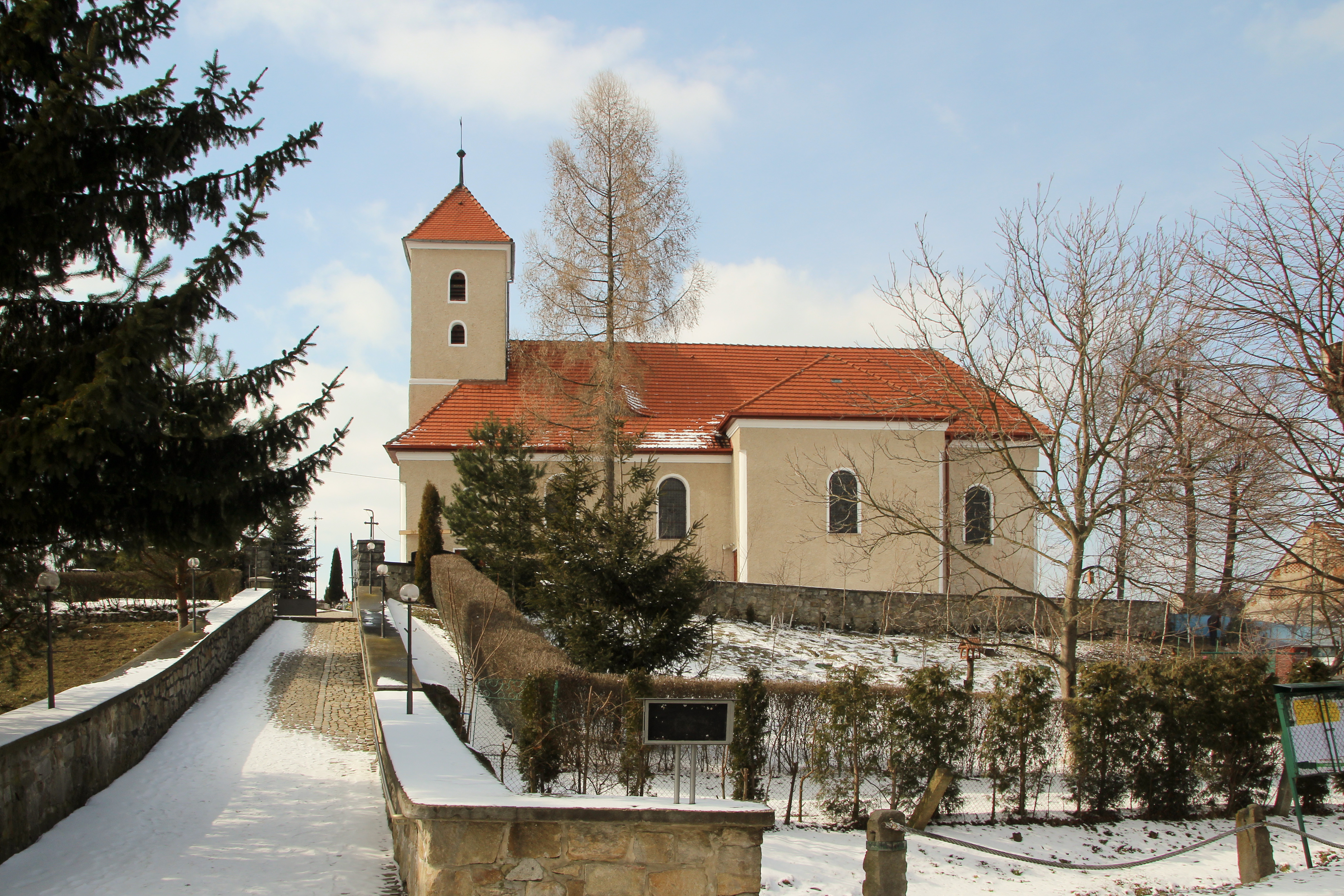
- Church

- Location within Poland
- Coordinates: 50°21′53″N 17°13′50″E
- Country: Poland
- Voivodeship: Opole
- County: Nysa
- Gmina: Otmuchów
- Population: 500

Jarnołtów [jarˈnɔu̯tuf] (German: Dürr Arnsdorf) is a village in the administrative district of Gmina Otmuchów, within Nysa County, Opole Voivodeship, in south-western Poland, close to the Czech border.
