= Siedlec, Nysa County =

Siedlec
- Village
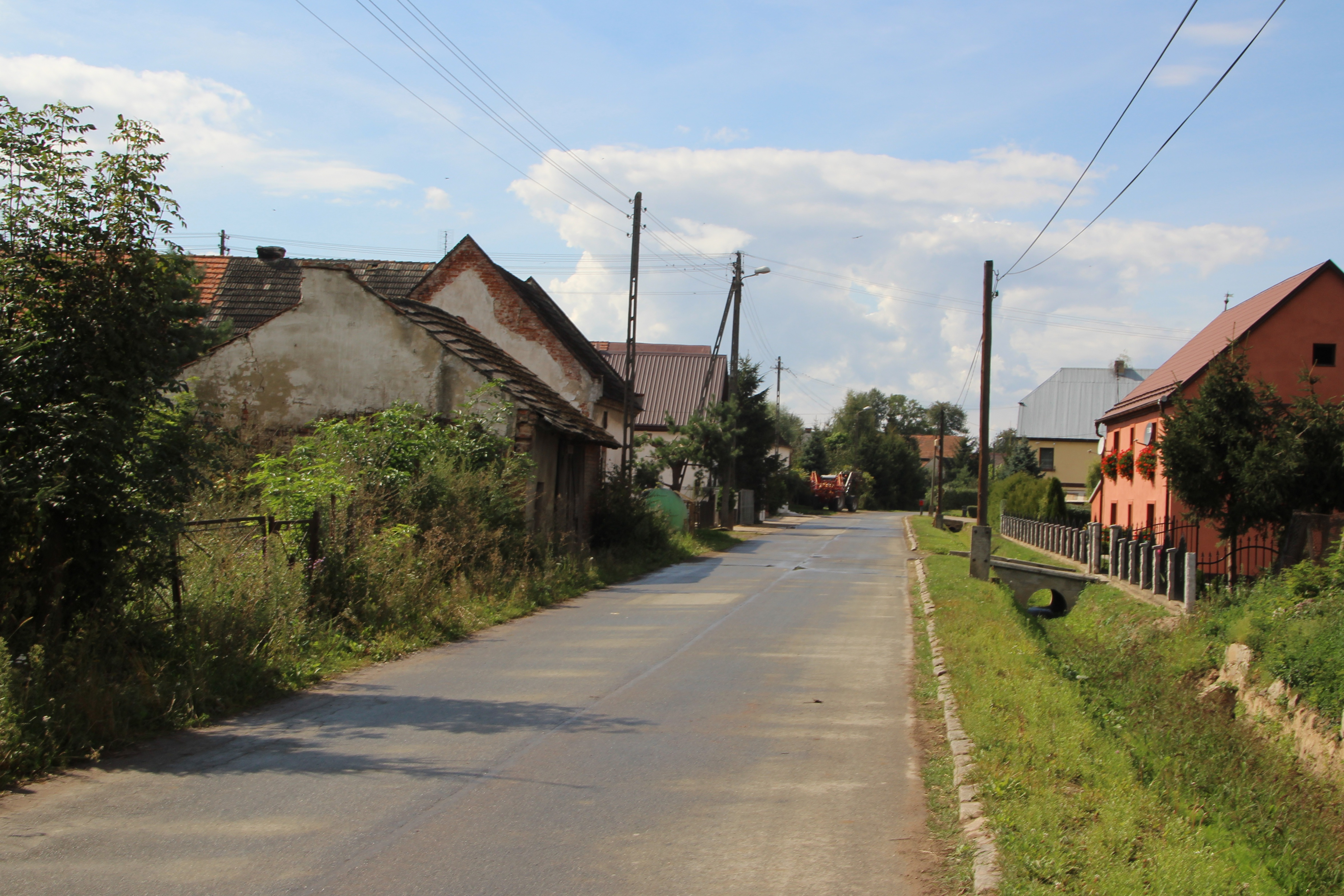

- Location within Poland
- Coordinates: 50°31′10″N 17°11′36″E
- Country: Poland
- Voivodeship: Opole
- County: Nysa
- Gmina: Otmuchów
- Population: 100

Siedlec [ˈɕɛdlɛt͡s] (German: Zedlitz) is a village in the administrative district of Gmina Otmuchów, within Nysa County, Opole Voivodeship, in south-western Poland, close to the Czech border.
