= Janowa =

- Village
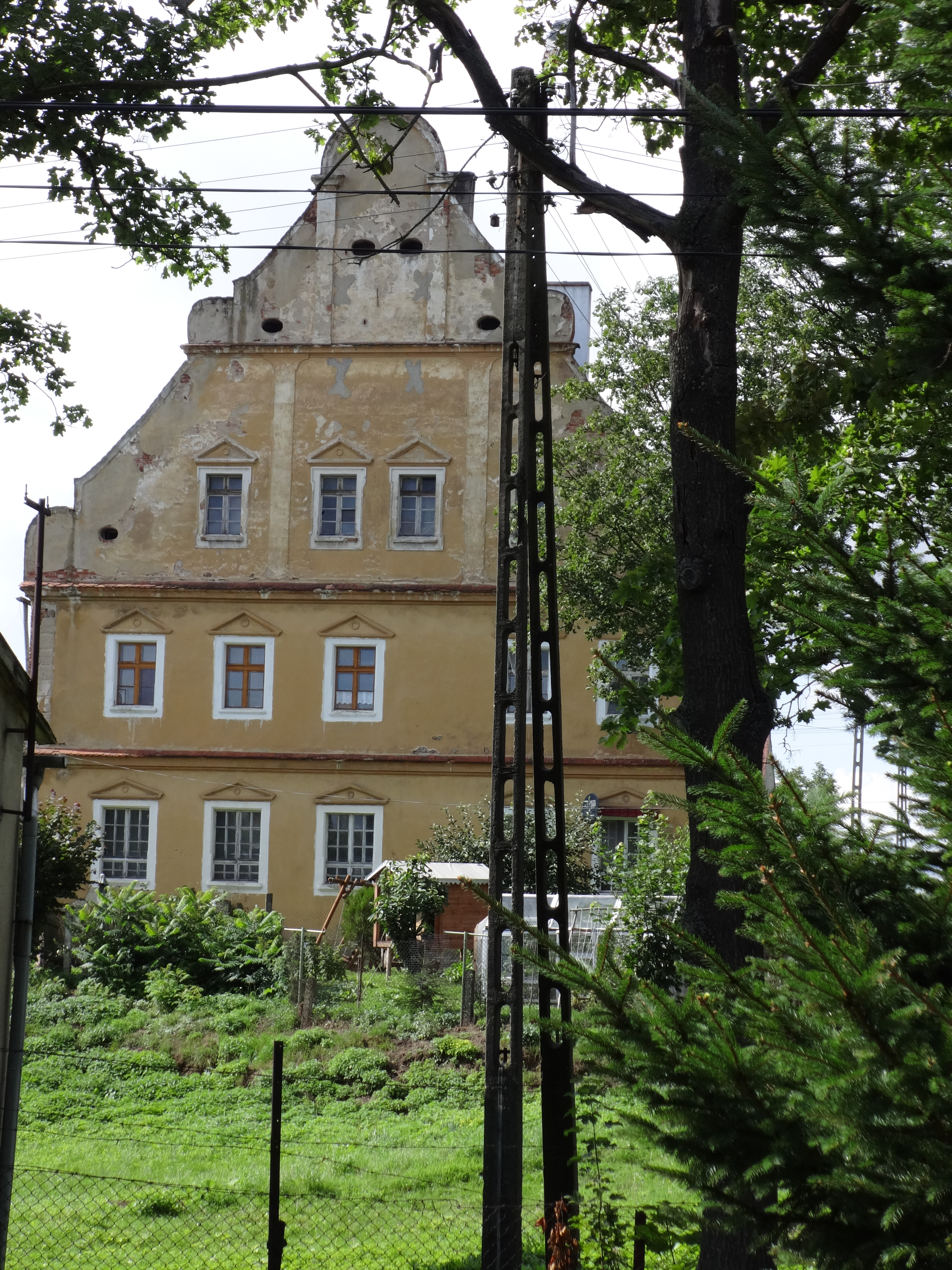
- Palace

- Location within Poland
- Coordinates: 50°31′11″N 17°7′29″E
- Country: Poland
- Voivodeship: Opole
- County: Nysa
- Gmina: Otmuchów
- Population: 180

Janowa [jaˈnɔva] (German: Johnsdorf) is a village in the administrative district of Gmina Otmuchów, within Nysa County, Opole Voivodeship, in south-western Poland, close to the Czech border.
