= Meszno, Opole Voivodeship =

Meszno
- Village
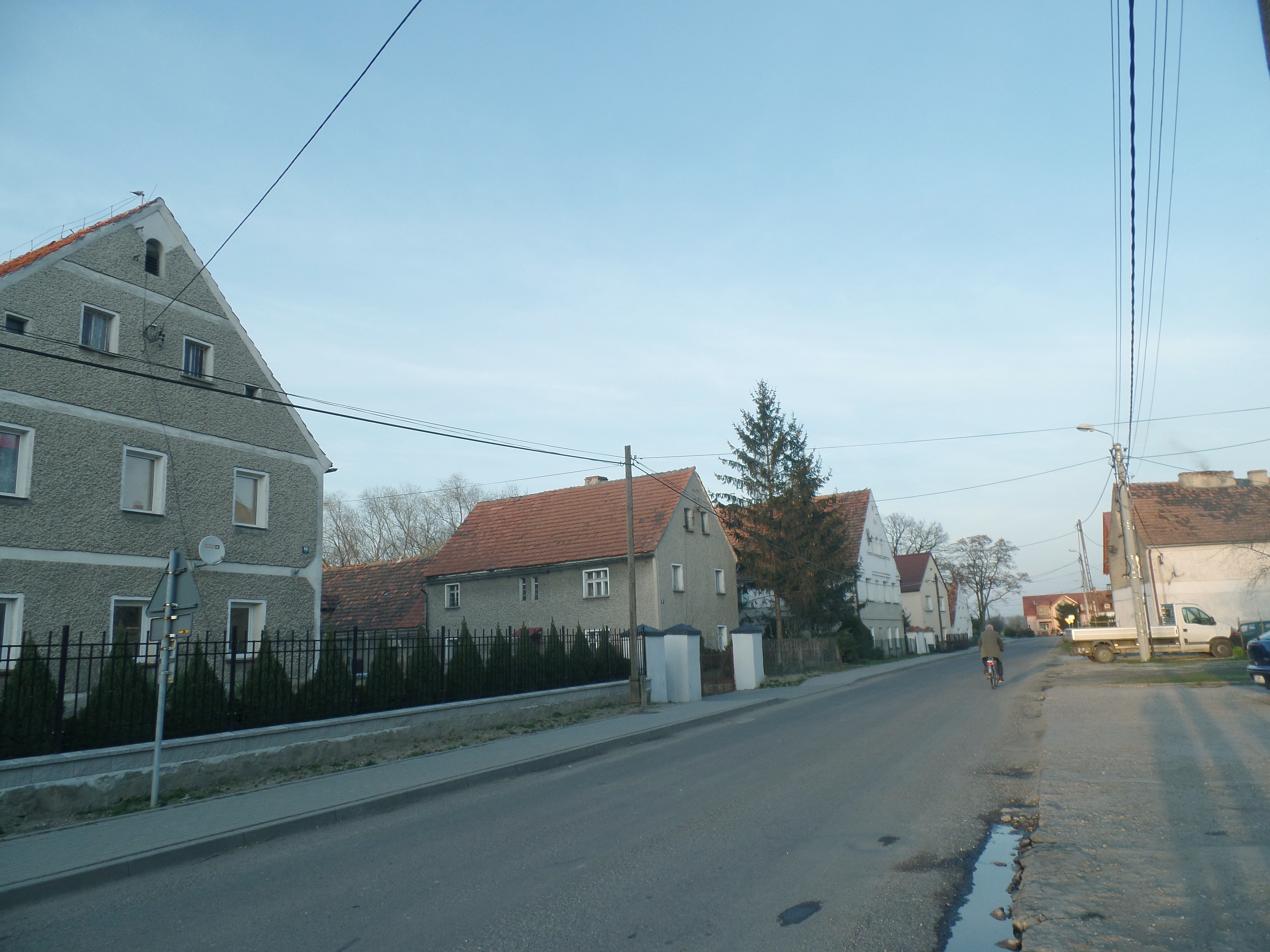

- Location within Poland
- Coordinates: 50°26′12″N 17°8′47″E
- Country: Poland
- Voivodeship: Opole
- County: Nysa
- Gmina: Otmuchów
- Elevation: 205 m (673 ft)
- Population (approx.): 380

Meszno [ˈmɛʂnɔ] (German: Mösen) is a village in the administrative district of Gmina Otmuchów, within Nysa County, Opole Voivodeship, in south-western Poland, close to the Czech border.
