= Ratnowice =

- Village
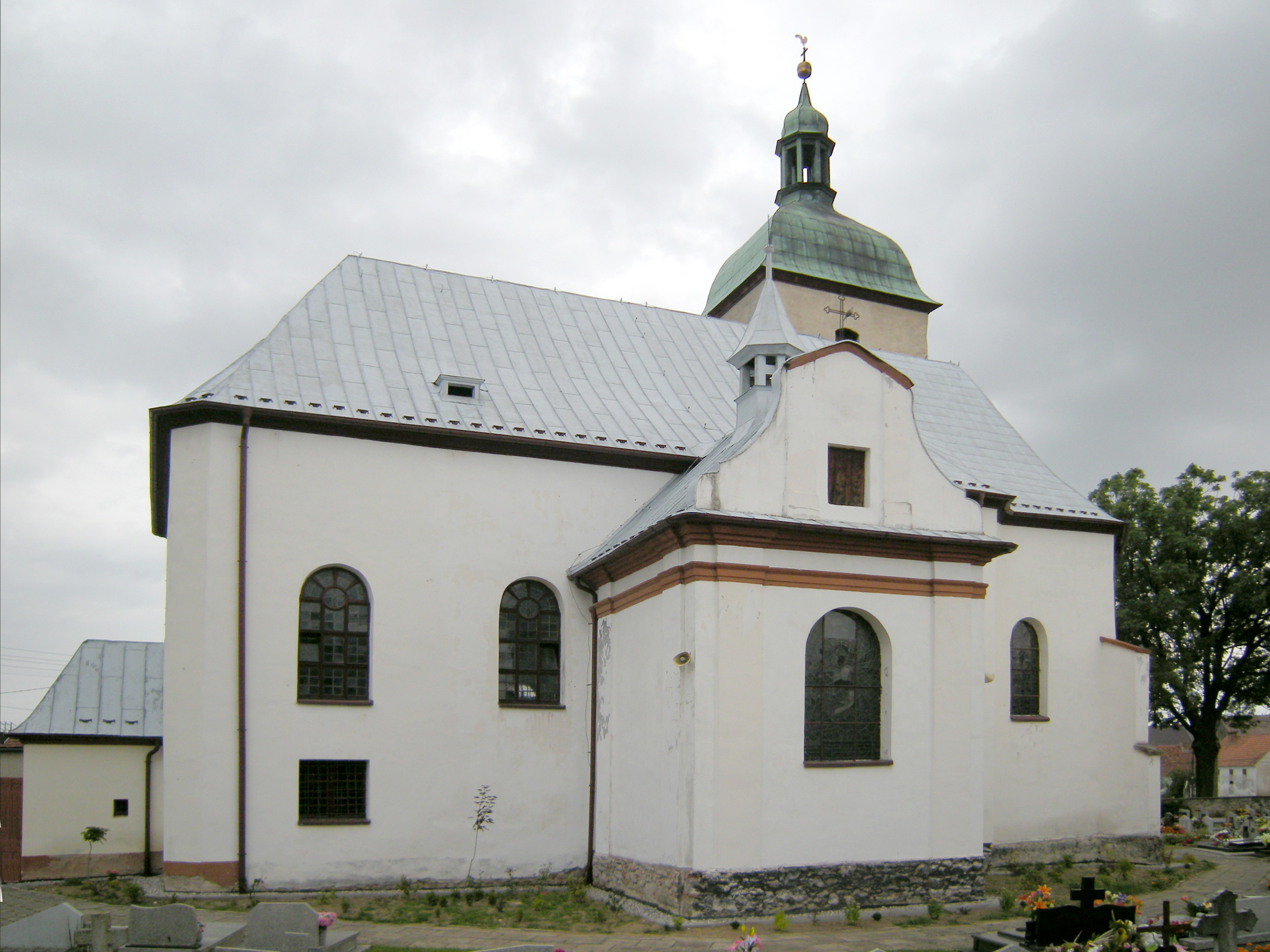
- Saint Martin church

- Location within Poland
- Coordinates: 50°25′22″N 17°7′40″E
- Country: Poland
- Voivodeship: Opole
- County: Nysa
- Gmina: Otmuchów
- Elevation: 210 m (690 ft)
- Population (approx.): 230

Ratnowice [ratnɔˈvit͡sɛ] (German: Rathmannsdorf) is a village in the administrative district of Gmina Otmuchów, within Nysa County, Opole Voivodeship, in south-western Poland, close to the Czech border.
