= Rysiowice =

- Village
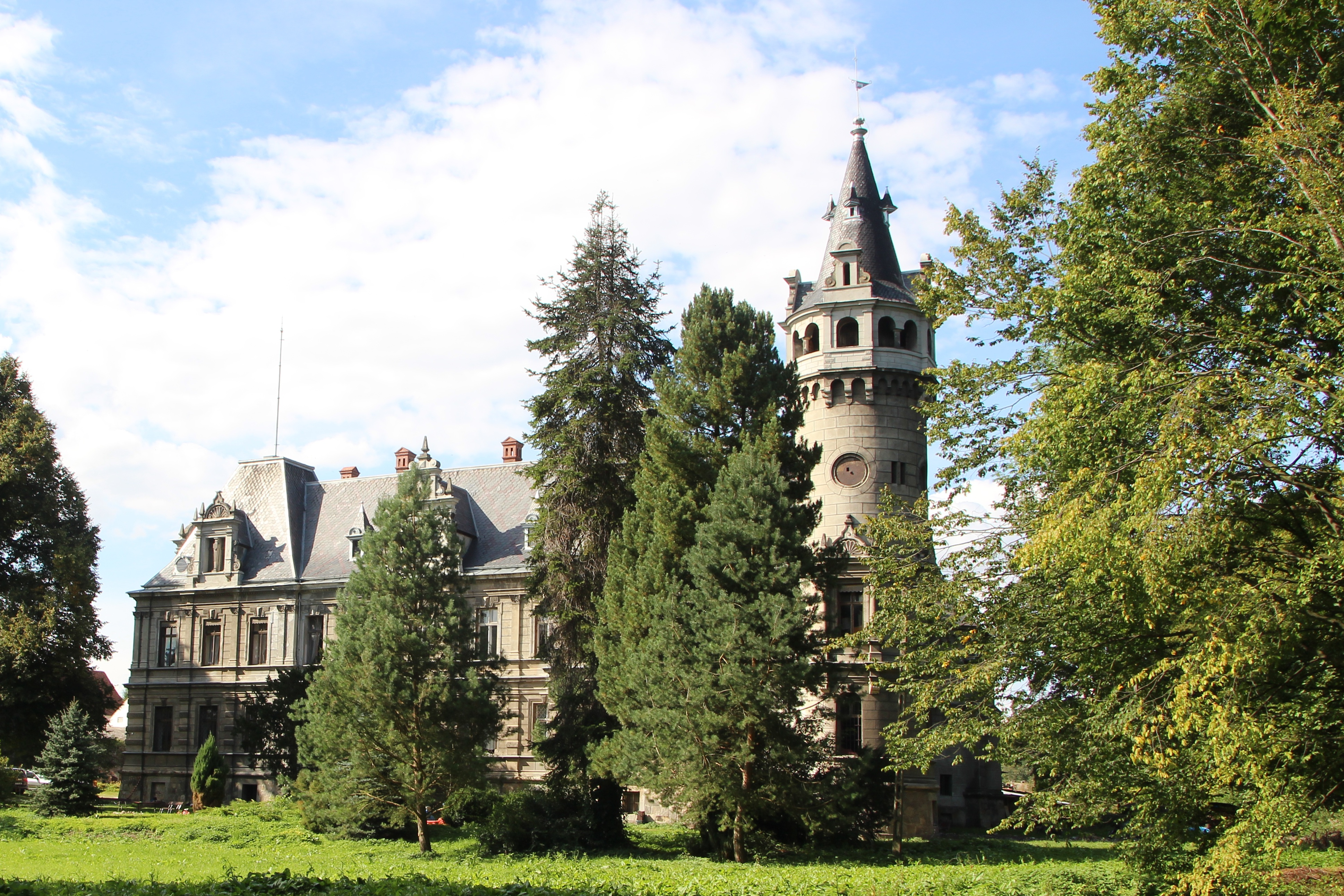
- Palace

- Location within Poland
- Coordinates: 50°32′N 17°13′E
- Country: Poland
- Voivodeship: Opole
- County: Nysa
- Gmina: Otmuchów

Rysiowice [rɨɕɔˈvit͡sɛ] (German: Reisewitz) is a village in the administrative district of Gmina Otmuchów, within Nysa County, Opole Voivodeship, in south-western Poland, close to the Czech border.
