= Wierzbno, Nysa County =

Wierzbno
- Village
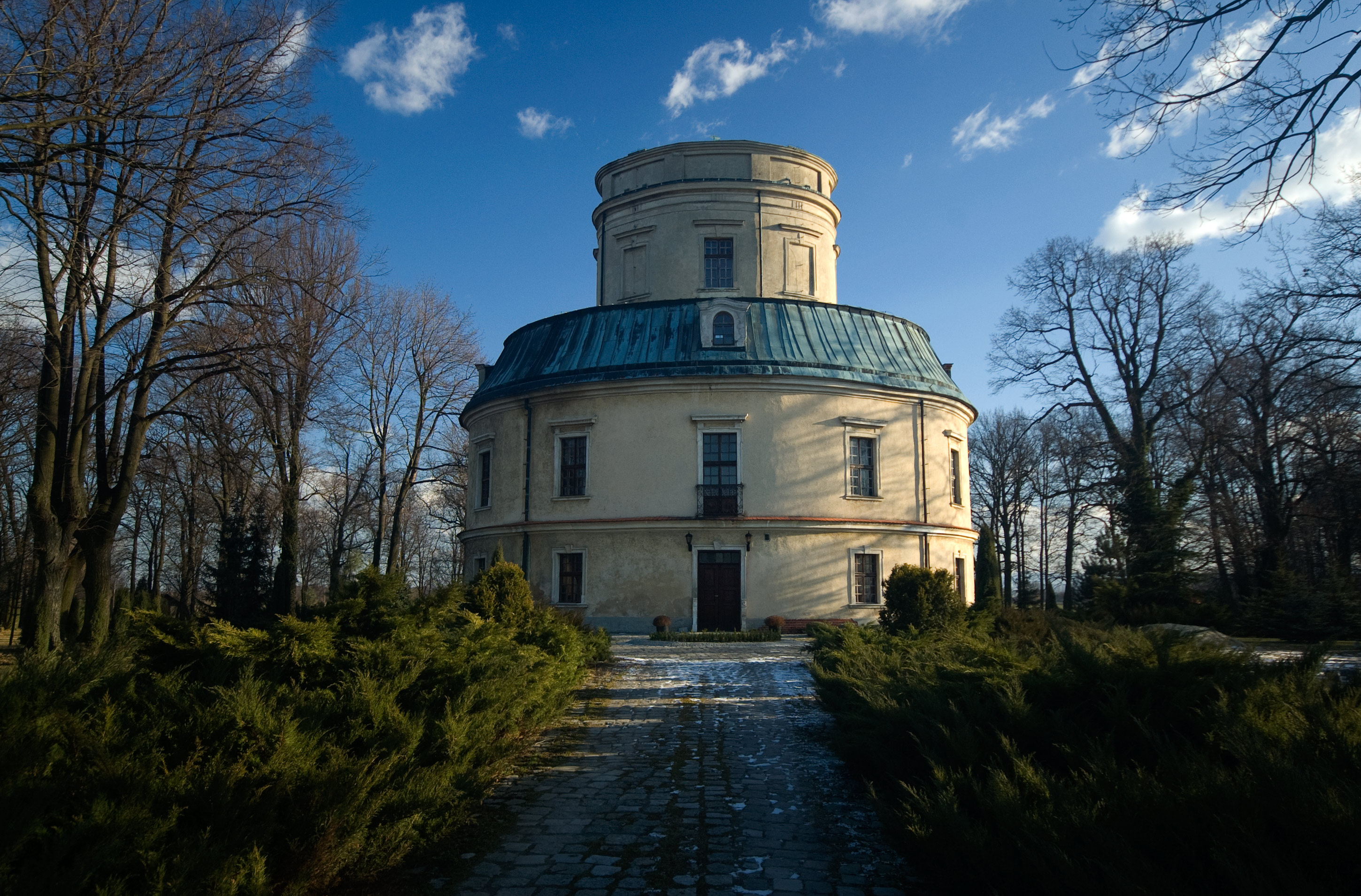
- Wierzbno Palace

- Location within Poland
- Coordinates: 50°25′52″N 17°11′53″E
- Country: Poland
- Voivodeship: Opole
- County: Nysa
- Gmina: Otmuchów
- Elevation: 210 m (690 ft)
- Population: 360
- Time zone: UTC+1 (CET)
  - Summer (DST): UTC+2 (CEST)
- Vehicle registration: ONY

Wierzbno [ˈvjɛʐbnɔ] (German: Würben) is a village in the administrative district of Gmina Otmuchów, within Nysa County, Opole Voivodeship, in south-western Poland, close to the Czech border.

The name of the village is of Polish origin and comes from the word wierzba, which means "willow".
