= Zwanowice, Nysa County =

Zwanowice
- Village
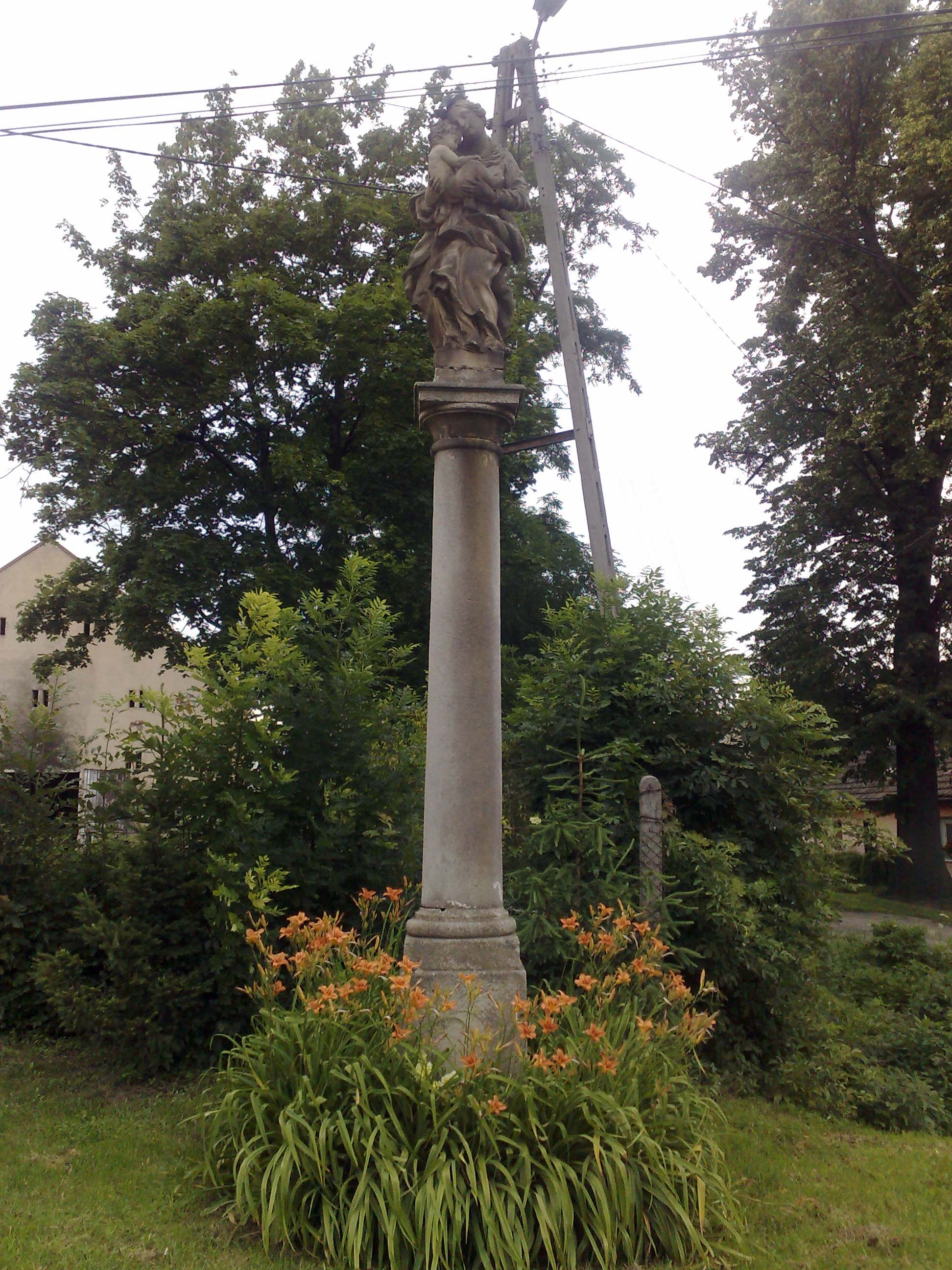

- Location within Poland
- Coordinates: 50°23′20″N 17°10′16″E
- Country: Poland
- Voivodeship: Opole
- County: Nysa
- Gmina: Otmuchów
- Population: 120

Zwanowice [zvanɔˈvit͡sɛ] (German: Schwandorf) is a village in the administrative district of Gmina Otmuchów, within Nysa County, Opole Voivodeship, in south-western Poland, close to the Czech border.
