= Maciejowice, Opole Voivodeship =

Maciejowice
- Village
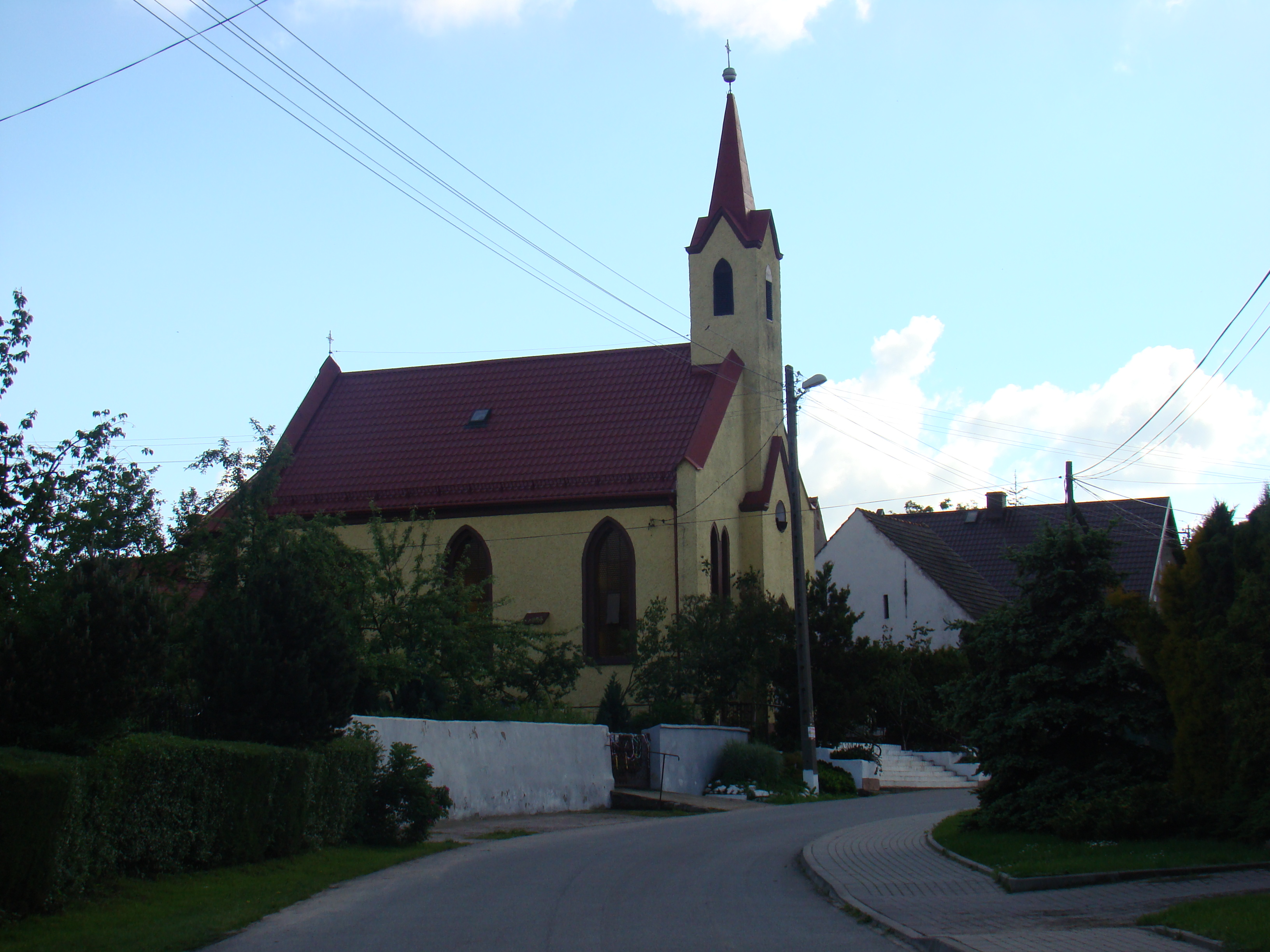
- Catholic church

- Location within Poland
- Coordinates: 50°30′3″N 17°8′10″E
- Country: Poland
- Voivodeship: Opole
- County: Nysa
- Gmina: Otmuchów
- Highest elevation: 240 m (790 ft)
- Lowest elevation: 220 m (720 ft)
- Population: 750

Maciejowice [mat͡ɕɛjɔˈvit͡sɛ] (German: Matzwitz) is a village in the administrative district of Gmina Otmuchów, within Nysa County, Opole Voivodeship, in south-western Poland, close to the Czech border.
