= Pasieki, Opole Voivodeship =

Pasieki, Poland
- Village
- Location within Poland
- Coordinates: 50°30′N 17°13′E
- Country: Poland
- Voivodeship: Opole
- County: Nysa
- Gmina: Otmuchów

Pasieki [paˈɕɛki] (German: Weidich) is a village in the administrative district of Gmina Otmuchów, within Nysa County, Opole Voivodeship, in south-western Poland, close to the Czech border.
