= Zwierzyniec, Opole Voivodeship =

Zwierzyniec
- Village
- Location within Poland
- Coordinates: 50°26′43″N 17°11′32″E
- Country: Poland
- Voivodeship: Opole
- County: Nysa
- Gmina: Otmuchów
- Time zone: UTC+1 (CET)
  - Summer (DST): UTC+2
- Postal code: 48-385
- Area code: +4877
- Vehicle registration: ONY

Zwierzyniec (German: Thiergarten) is a village in the administrative district of Gmina Otmuchów, within Nysa County, Opole Voivodeship, south-western Poland.
