= Jasienica Górna =

- Village
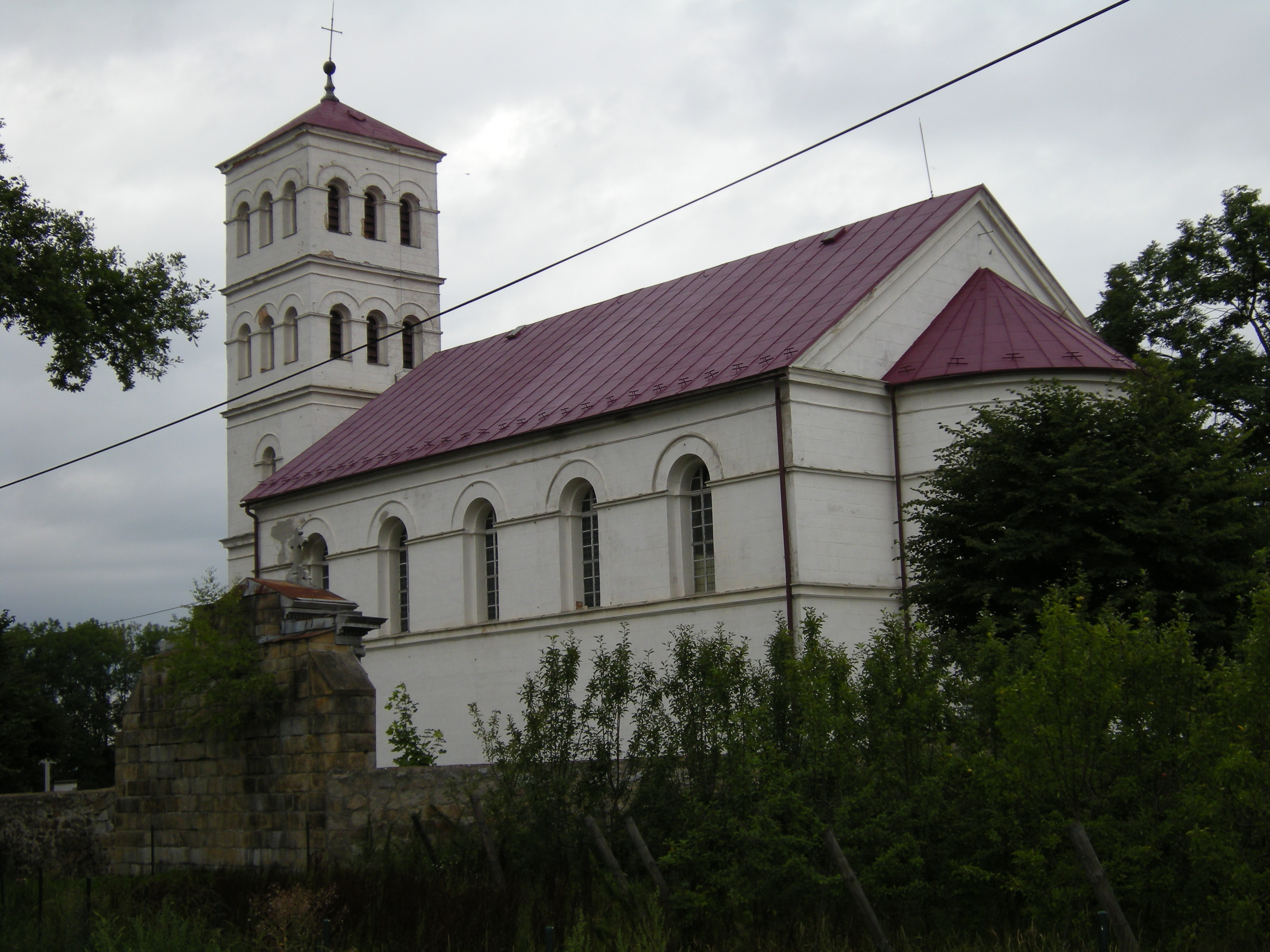
- Catholic church

- Location within Poland
- Coordinates: 50°23′57″N 17°7′44″E
- Country: Poland
- Voivodeship: Opole
- County: Nysa
- Gmina: Otmuchów
- Population (approx.): 400

Jasienica Górna [jaɕɛˈnit͡sa ˈɡurna] (German: Ober Hermsdorf) is a village in the administrative district of Gmina Otmuchów, within Nysa County, Opole Voivodeship, in south-western Poland, close to the Czech border.

== History ==
The present-day Polish village Jasienica Górna and the present-day Czech village Horní Heřmanice, directly across the Czech side of the border, were once a single village. After the Silesian Wars, the newly drawn border divided the village in two. The division continued through the Communist era of 1945–1989, and the border was not easily crossed until the two countries joined the Schengen Area in 2007.
