= Broniszowice, Opole Voivodeship =

Broniszowice
- Village
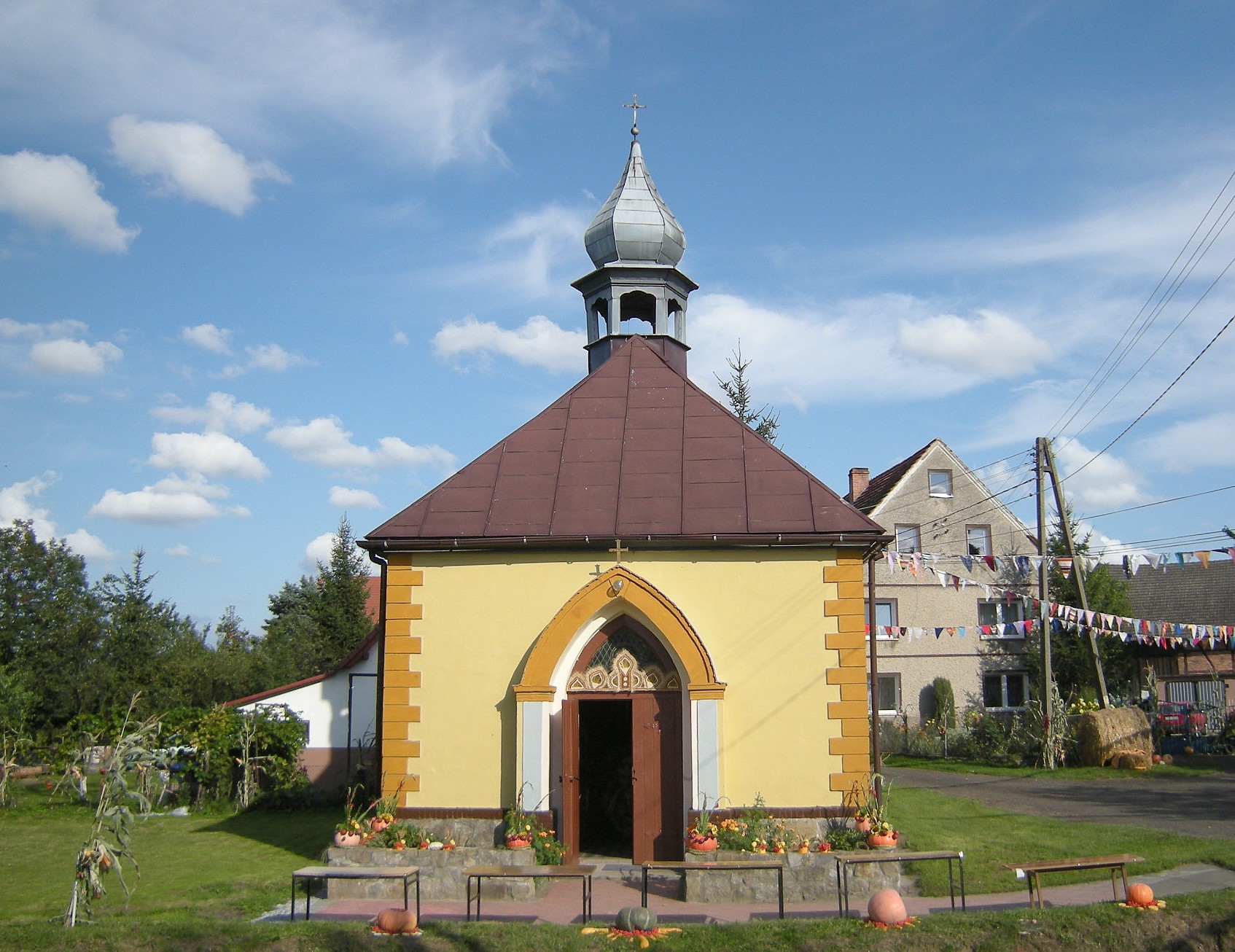
- Chapel

- Location within Poland
- Coordinates: 50°25′34″N 17°10′44″E
- Country: Poland
- Voivodeship: Opole
- County: Nysa
- Gmina: Otmuchów
- Elevation: 210 m (690 ft)
- Population: 110

Broniszowice [brɔniʂɔˈvit͡sɛ] (German: Brünschwitz) is a village in the administrative district of Gmina Otmuchów, within Nysa County, Opole Voivodeship, in south-western Poland, close to the Czech border.
