= Starowice, Nysa County =

Starowice
- Village
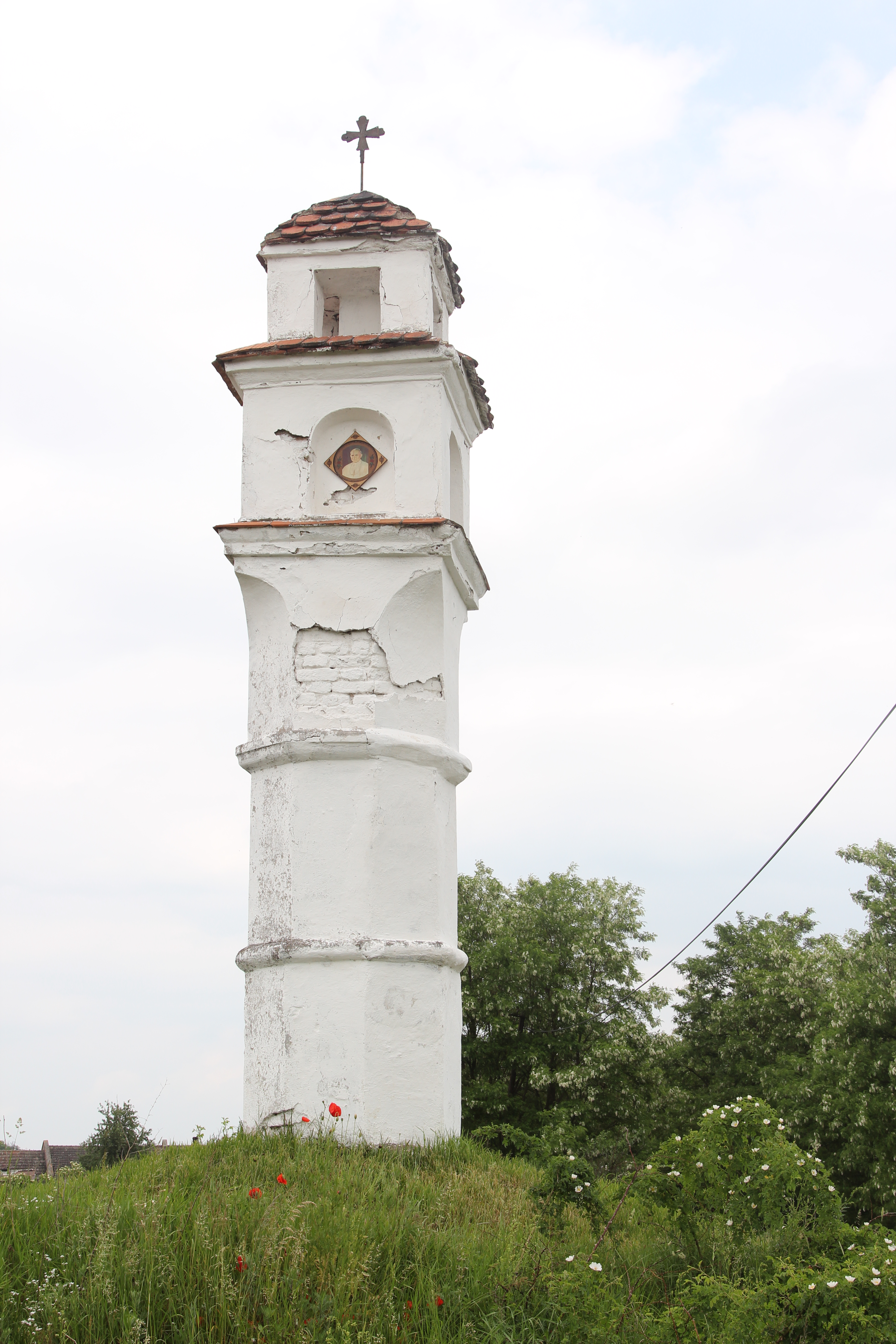
- Shrine

- Location within Poland
- Coordinates: 50°30′36″N 17°9′51″E
- Country: Poland
- Voivodeship: Opole
- County: Nysa
- Gmina: Otmuchów
- Population: 180

Starowice [starɔˈvit͡sɛ] (German: Starrwitz) is a village in the administrative district of Gmina Otmuchów, within Nysa County, Opole Voivodeship, in south-western Poland, close to the Czech border.
