= Lasowice, Opole Voivodeship =

Lasowice
- Village
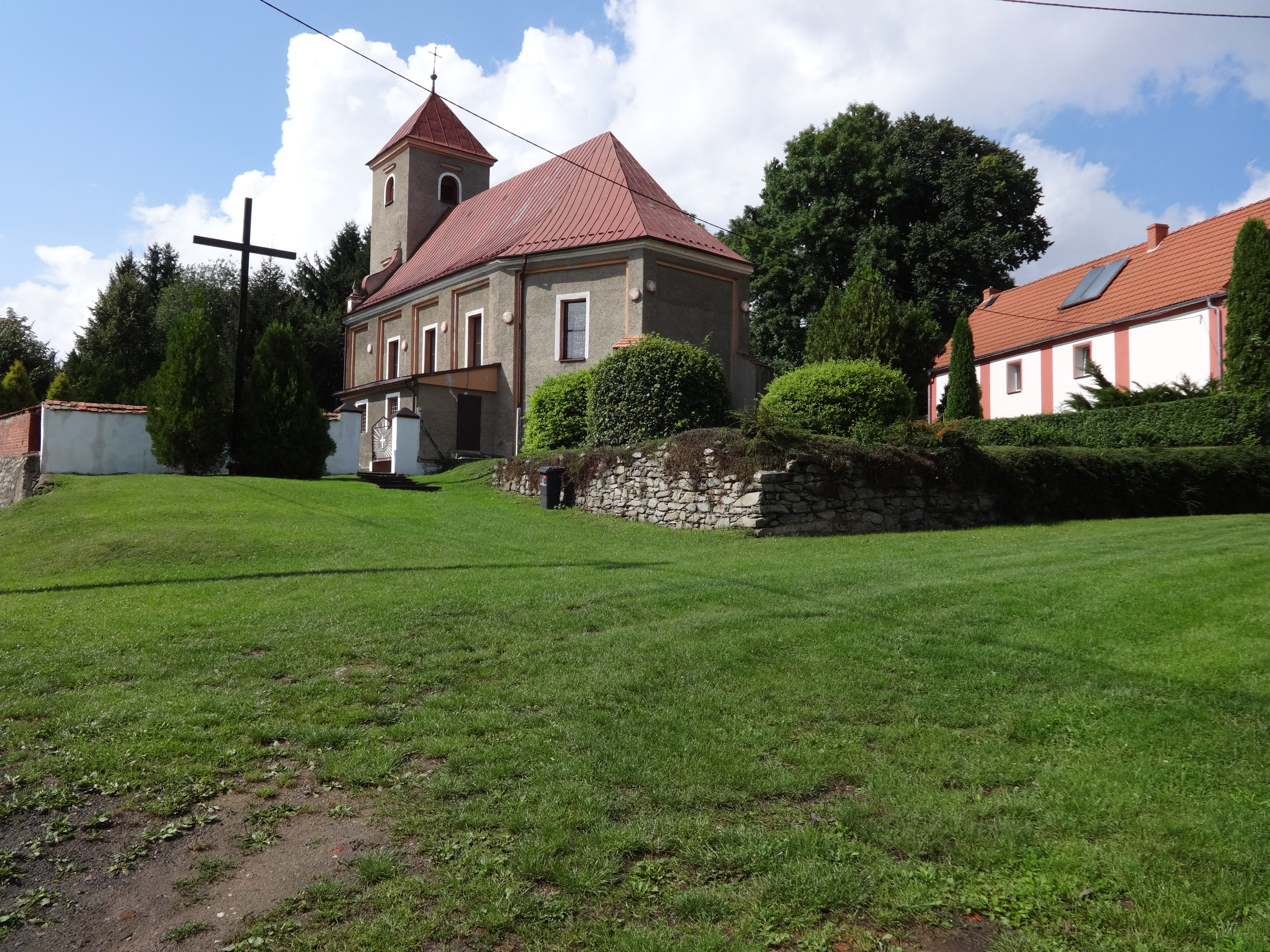
- Catholic church

- Location within Poland
- Coordinates: 50°30′43″N 17°6′11″E
- Country: Poland
- Voivodeship: Opole
- County: Nysa
- Gmina: Otmuchów
- Population: 170

Lasowice [lasɔˈvit͡sɛ] (German: Lasswitz) is a village in the administrative district of Gmina Otmuchów, within Nysa County, Opole Voivodeship, in south-western Poland, close to the Czech border.
