= Ulanowice =

- Village
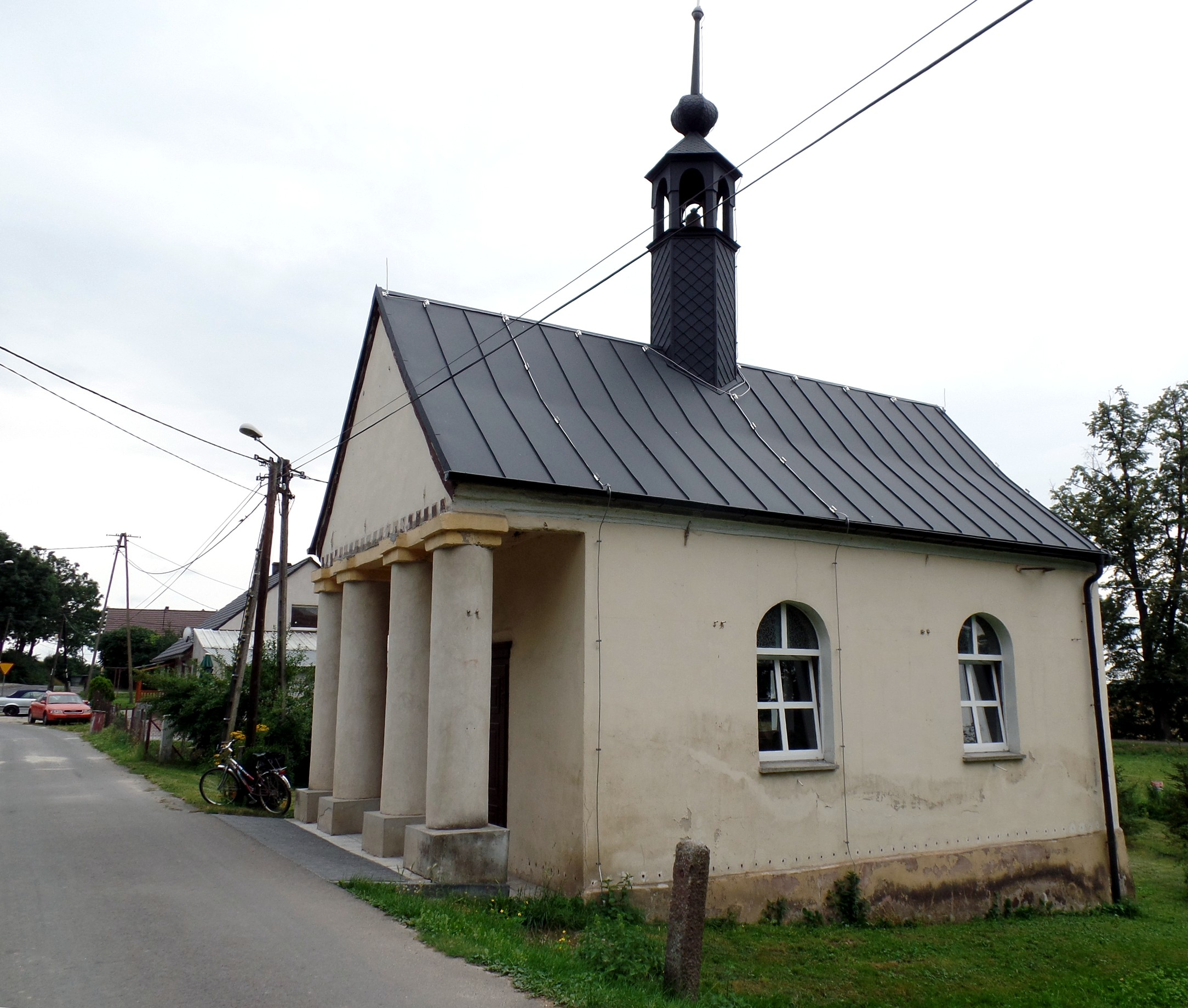
- Chapel

- Location within Poland
- Coordinates: 50°29′N 17°13′E
- Country: Poland
- Voivodeship: Opole
- County: Nysa
- Gmina: Otmuchów

Ulanowice [ulanɔˈvit͡sɛ] (German: Ullersdorf) is a village in the administrative district of Gmina Otmuchów, within Nysa County, Opole Voivodeship, in south-western Poland, close to the Czech border.
