= Malerzowice Małe =

- Village
- Location within Poland
- Coordinates: 50°30′N 17°12′E
- Country: Poland
- Voivodeship: Opole
- County: Nysa
- Gmina: Otmuchów

Malerzowice Małe [malɛʐɔˈvit͡sɛ ˈmawɛ] (German: Klein Mahlendorf) is a village in the administrative district of Gmina Otmuchów, within Nysa County, Opole Voivodeship, in south-western Poland, close to the Czech border.
