= Goraszowice =

- Village
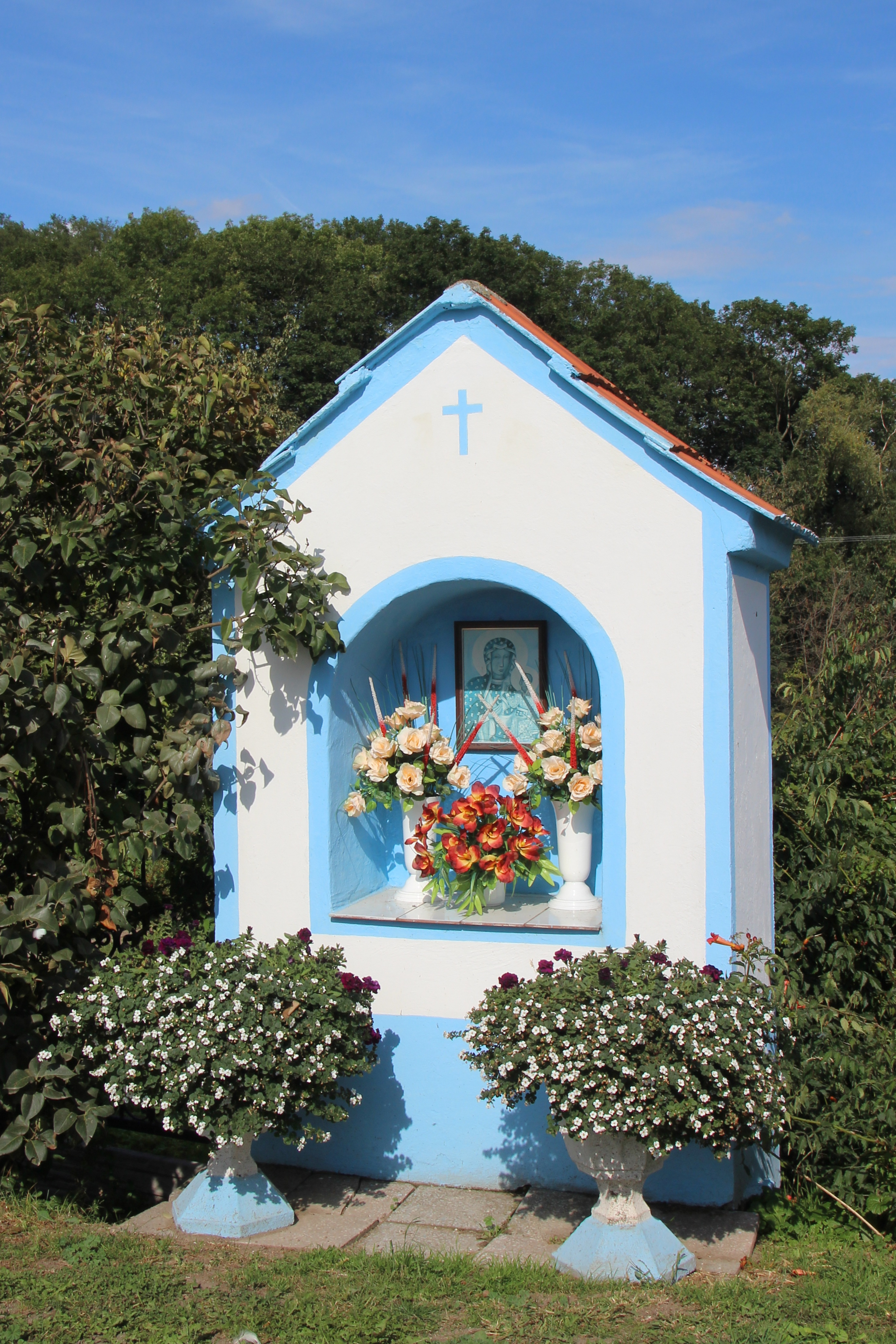

- Location within Poland
- Coordinates: 50°31′9″N 17°14′16″E
- Country: Poland
- Voivodeship: Opole
- County: Nysa
- Gmina: Otmuchów
- Population: 90

Goraszowice [ɡɔraʂɔˈvit͡sɛ] (German: Graschwitz) is a village in the administrative district of Gmina Otmuchów, within Nysa County, Opole Voivodeship, in south-western Poland, close to the Czech border.
