= Kałków, Opole Voivodeship =

Kałków
- Village
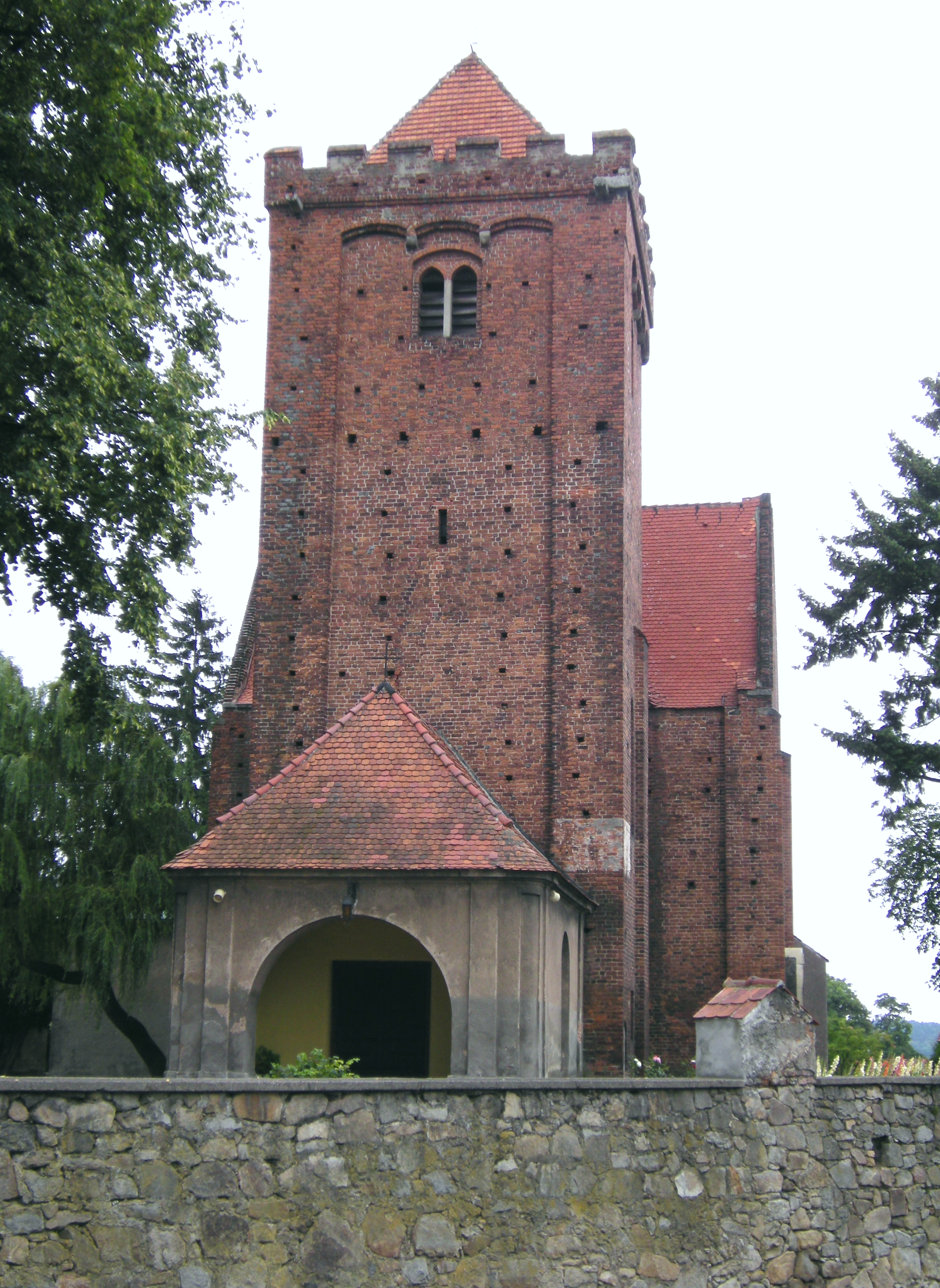
- Virgin Mary Church

- Location within Poland
- Coordinates: 50°24′21″N 17°11′15″E
- Country: Poland
- Voivodeship: Opole
- County: Nysa
- Gmina: Otmuchów
- Elevation: 230 m (750 ft)
- Population: 620
- Time zone: UTC+1 (CET)
  - Summer (DST): UTC+2 (CEST)
- Vehicle registration: ONY
- Website: http://www.kalkow.pl

Kałków [ˈkau̯kuf] (German: Kalkau) is a village in the administrative district of Gmina Otmuchów, within Nysa County, Opole Voivodeship, in south-western Poland, close to the Czech border.

== History ==
In the 10th century the area became part of the emerging Polish state. The village was mentioned in the Liber fundationis episcopatus Vratislaviensis from around 1305, when it was part of fragmented Piast-ruled Poland. Later on, it was also part of Bohemia (Czechia), Prussia, and Germany. During World War II, the Germans operated the E456 forced labour subcamp of the Stalag VIII-B/344 prisoner-of-war camp in the village. After Germany's defeat in the war, in 1945, the village became again part of Poland.
