= Kamienna Góra, Opole Voivodeship =

Kamienna Góra
- Village
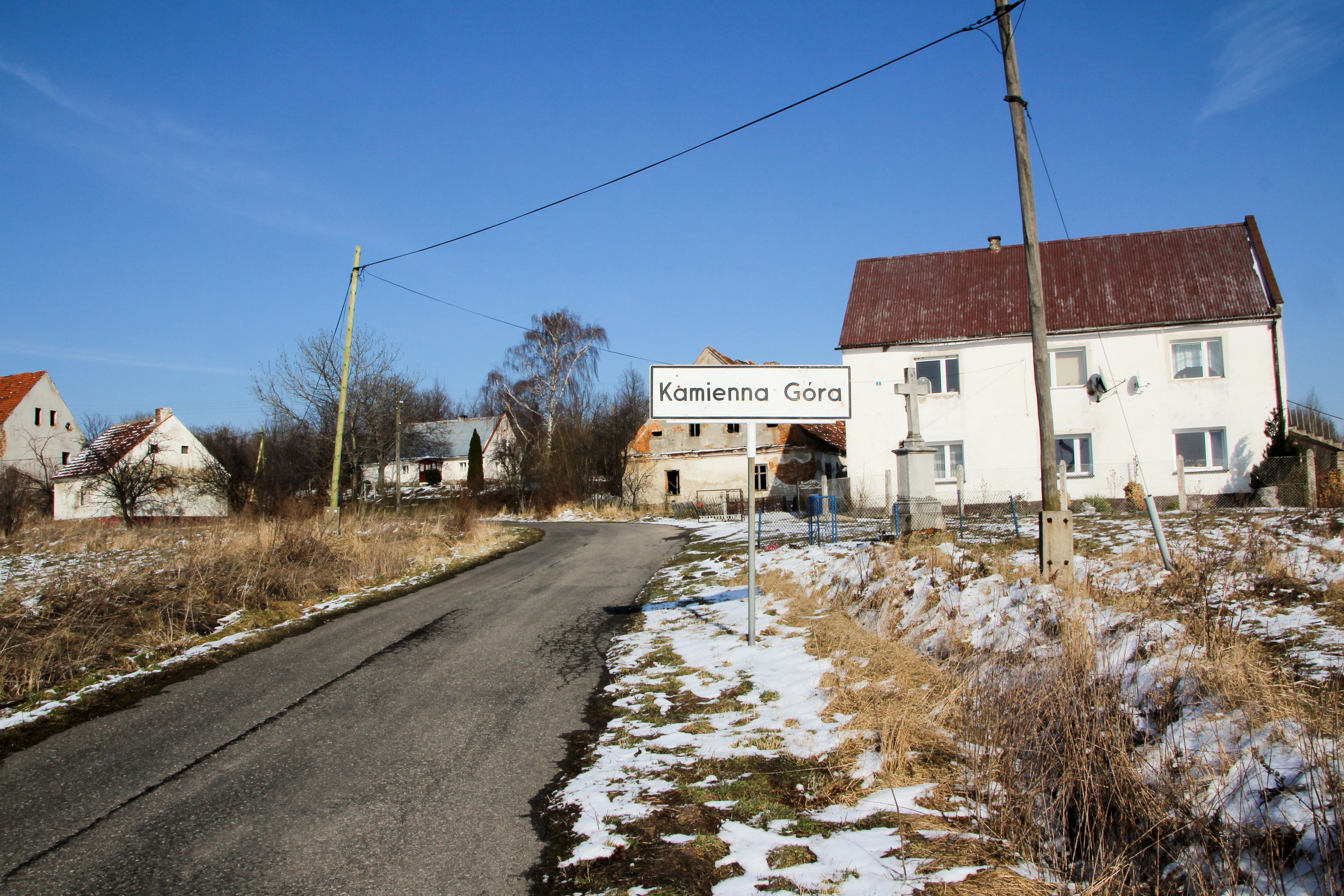

- Location within Poland
- Coordinates: 50°23′13″N 17°16′18″E
- Country: Poland
- Voivodeship: Opole
- County: Nysa
- Gmina: Otmuchów

Kamienna Góra [kaˈmjɛnna ˈɡura] (German: Steinberg) is a village in the administrative district of Gmina Otmuchów, within Nysa County, Opole Voivodeship, in south-western Poland, close to the Czech border.
