= Jodłów, Opole Voivodeship =

Jodłów
- Village
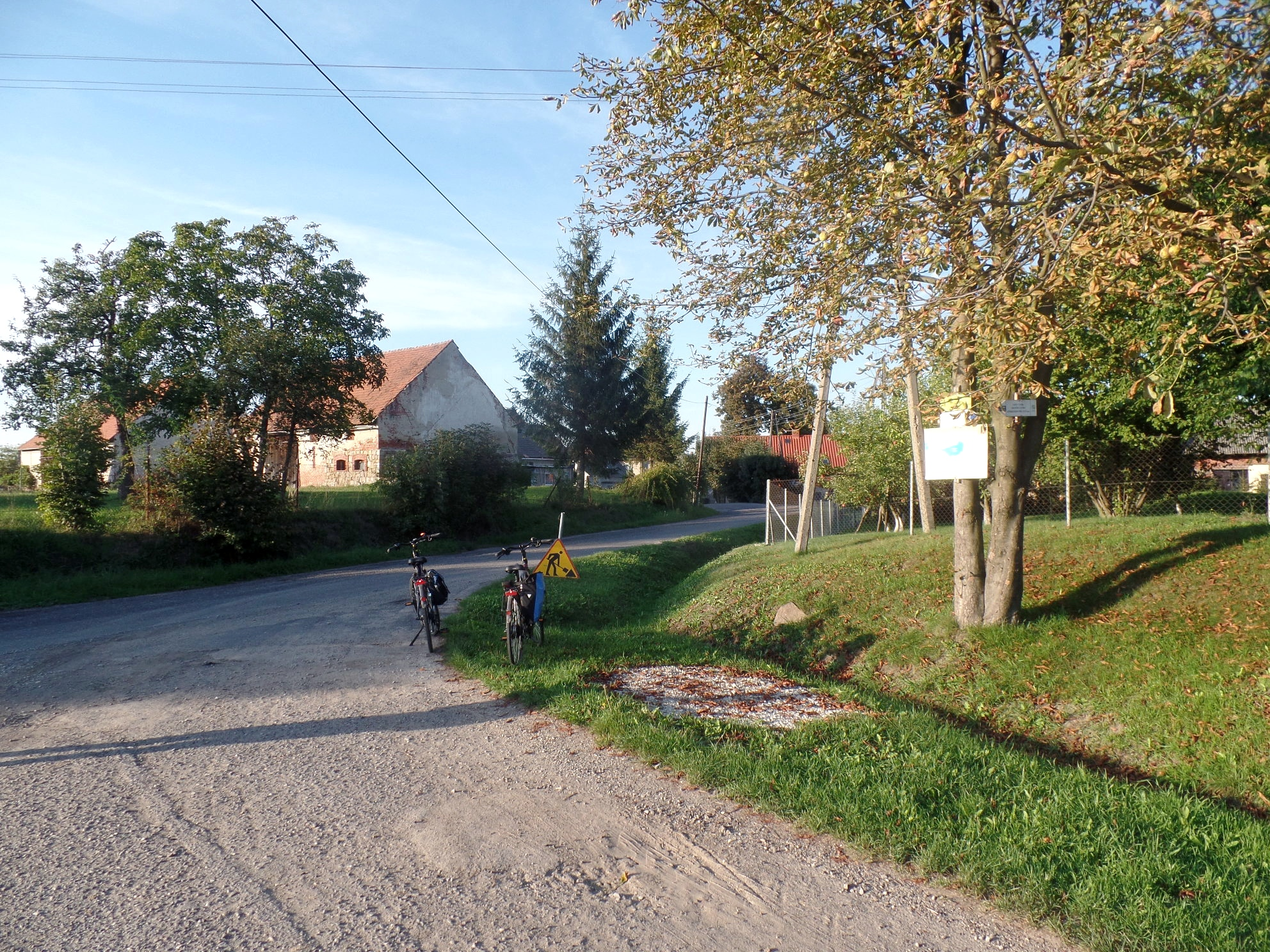

- Location within Poland
- Coordinates: 50°24′1″N 17°13′51″E
- Country: Poland
- Voivodeship: Opole
- County: Nysa
- Gmina: Otmuchów
- Population: 214

Jodłów [ˈjɔdwuf] (German: Tannenberg) is a village in the administrative district of Gmina Otmuchów, within Nysa County, Opole Voivodeship, in south-western Poland, close to the Czech border.
