= Biała Nyska =

- Village
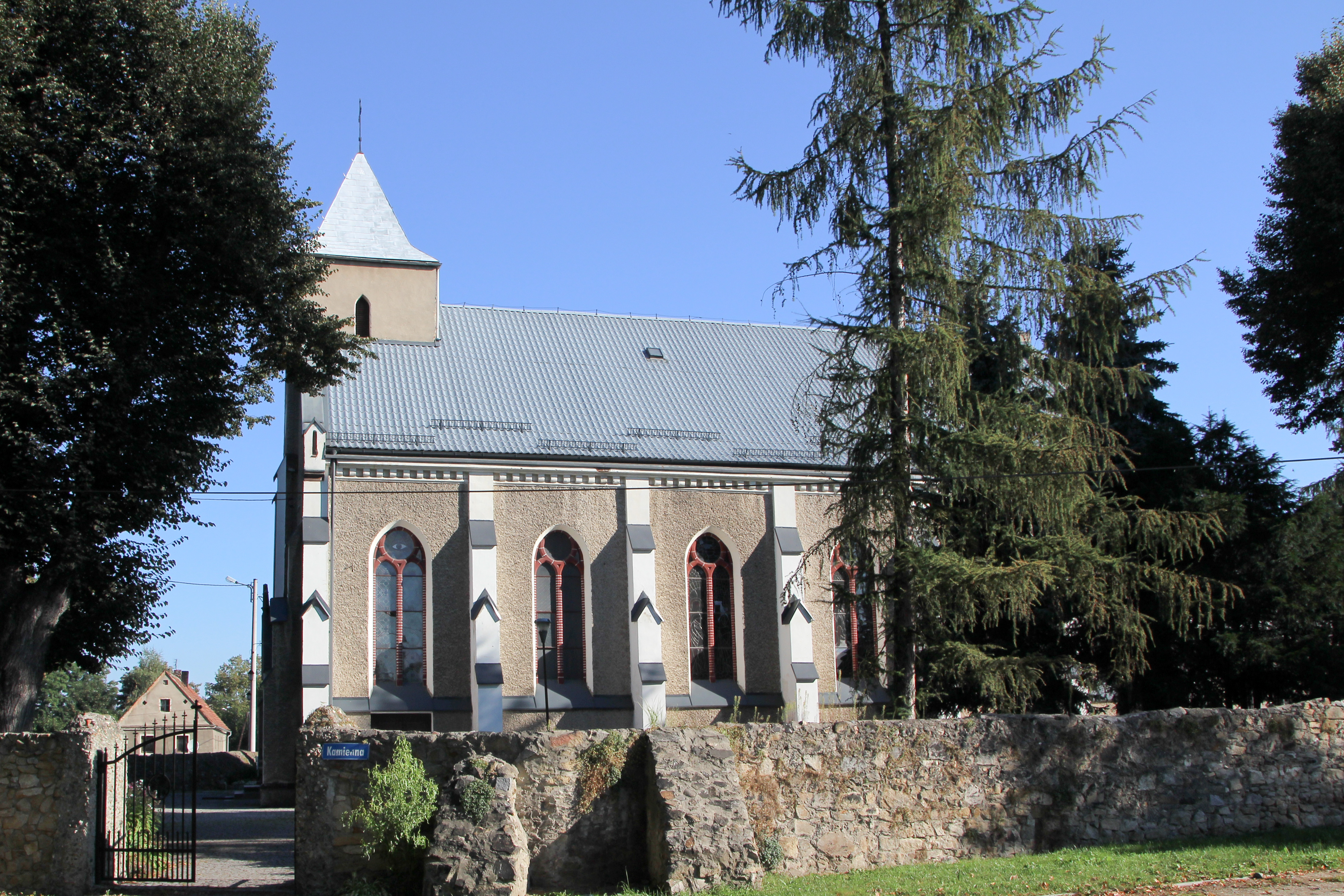
- Saint John the Evangelist church

- Location within Poland
- Coordinates: 50°26′N 17°18′E
- Country: Poland
- Voivodeship: Opole
- County: Nysa
- Gmina: Nysa
- Time zone: UTC+1 (CET)
  - Summer (DST): UTC+2 (CEST)
- Vehicle registration: ONY

Biała Nyska [ˈbjawa ˈnɨska] (German: Bielau) is a village in the administrative district of Gmina Nysa, within Nysa County, Opole Voivodeship, in southern Poland.

== Etymology ==
The name of the village is of Polish origin. It is named after the Biała Głuchołaska River.
