= Buków, Opole Voivodeship =

Buków
- Village
- Location within Poland
- Coordinates: 50°25′16″N 17°13′29″E
- Country: Poland
- Voivodeship: Opole
- County: Nysa
- Gmina: Otmuchów
- Elevation: 210 m (690 ft)
- Population: 490

Buków [ˈbukuf] (German: Baucke) is a village in the administrative district of Gmina Otmuchów, within Nysa County, Opole Voivodeship, in south-western Poland, close to the Czech border.
