= Nadziejów, Opole Voivodeship =

Nadziejów
- Village
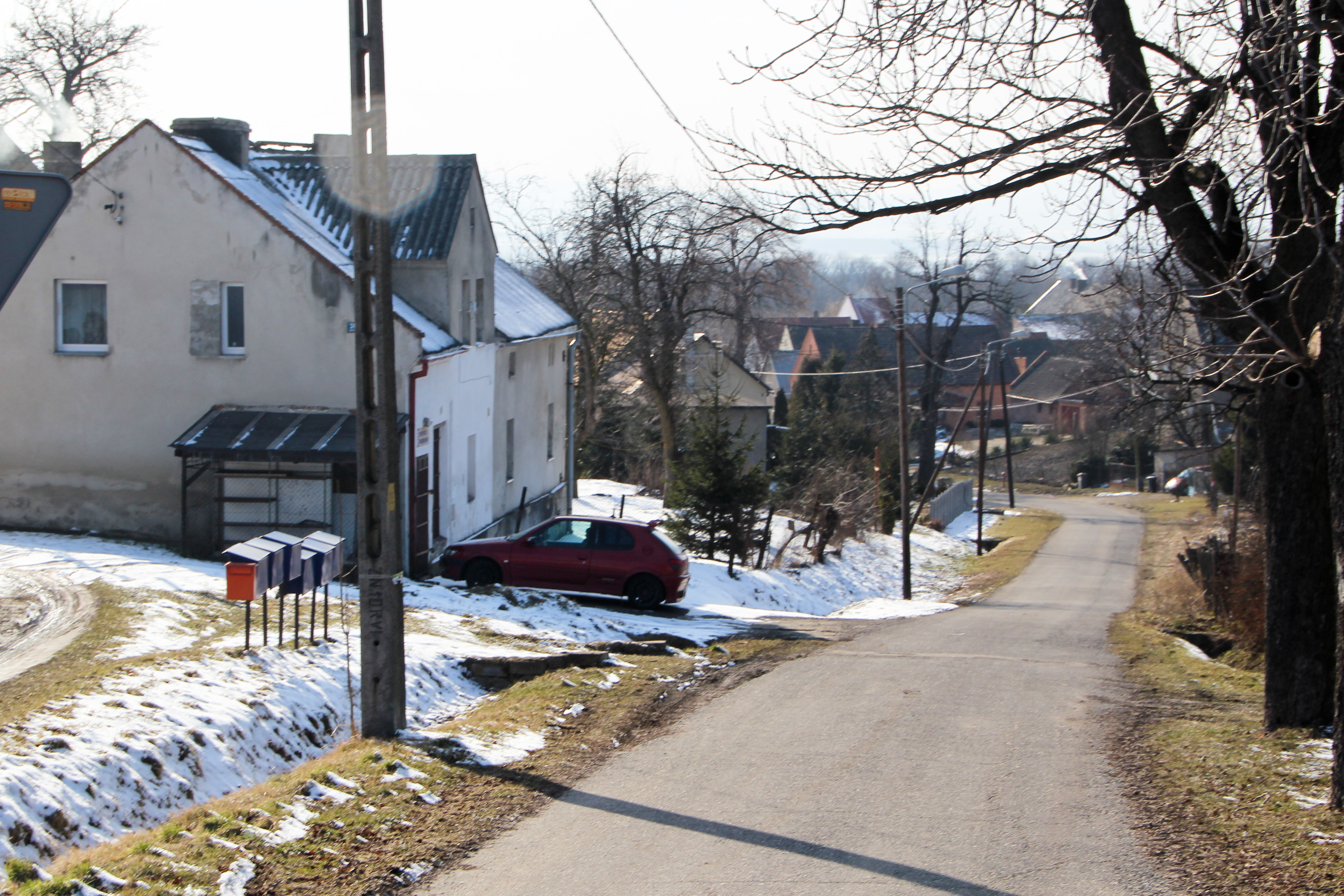

- Location within Poland
- Coordinates: 50°23′21″N 17°15′28″E
- Country: Poland
- Voivodeship: Opole
- County: Nysa
- Gmina: Otmuchów
- Population (approx.): 280

Nadziejów [naˈd͡ʑɛjuf] (German: Naasdorf) is a village in the administrative district of Gmina Otmuchów, within Nysa County, Opole Voivodeship, in south-western Poland, close to the Czech border.
