= Gmina Otmuchów =

Gmina Otmuchów Otmuchów Commune
- Gmina
- Coat of arms
- Interactive map of Gmina Otmuchów
- Coordinates (Otmuchów): 50°28′0″N 17°10′30″E
- Country: Poland
- Voivodeship: Opole
- County: Nysa
- Seat: Otmuchów

Area
  - Total: 187.41 km^{2} (72.36 sq mi)

Population (2019-06-30)
  - Total: 13,559
  - Density: 72.349/km^{2} (187.38/sq mi)
  - Urban: 6,581
  - Rural: 6,978
- Website: http://www.otmuchow.pl

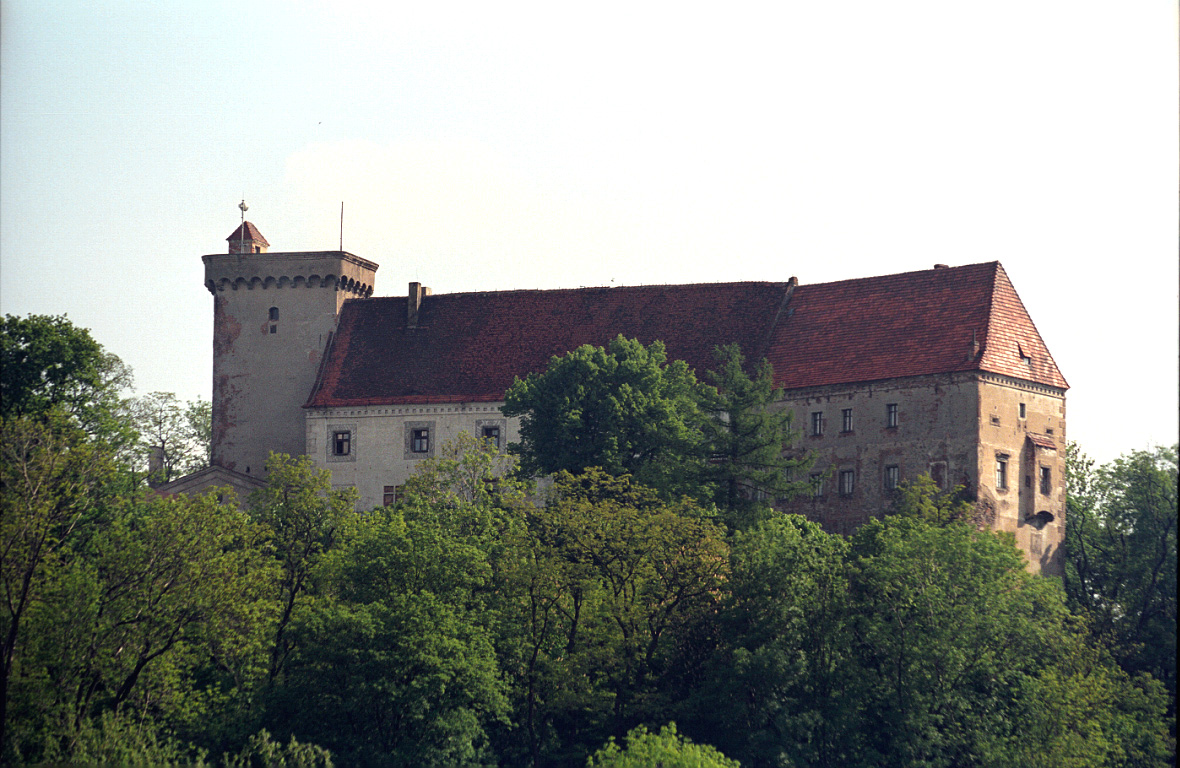
Otmuchów

Gmina Otmuchów is an urban-rural gmina (administrative district) in Nysa County, Opole Voivodeship, in south-western Poland, on the Czech border. Its seat is the town of Otmuchów, which lies approximately 12 kilometres (7 mi) west of Nysa and 59 km (37 mi) south-west of the regional capital Opole.

The gmina covers an area of 187.41 square kilometres (72.4 sq mi), and as of 2019 its total population is 13,559.

== Villages ==
Apart from the town of Otmuchów, Gmina Otmuchów contains the villages and settlements of Bednary, Broniszowice, Buków, Goraszowice, Grądy, Grodziszcze, Janowa, Jarnołtów, Jasienica Górna, Jodłów, Kałków, Kamienna Góra, Kijów, Krakówkowice, Kwiatków, Łąka, Laskowice, Lasowice, Ligota Wielka, Lubiatów, Maciejowice, Malerzowice Małe, Meszno, Nadziejów, Nieradowice, Pasieki, Piotrowice Nyskie, Ratnowice, Rysiowice, Sarnowice, Siedlec, Śliwice, Starowice, Suszkowice, Ulanowice, Wierzbno, Wójcice, Zawsie, Zwanowice, Zwierzyniec.

== Neighbouring gminas ==
Gmina Otmuchów is bordered by the gminas of Głuchołazy, Kamiennik, Nysa, Paczków, Pakosławice and Ziębice. It also borders the Czech Republic.

== Twin towns – sister cities ==
Gmina Otmuchów is twinned with:

- Bernkastel-Kues, Germany
- La Bourboule, France
- Javorník, Czech Republic
- Lopatyn, Ukraine
- Milo, Italy
- Varsány, Hungary
