= Łąka, Nysa County =

Łąka
- Village
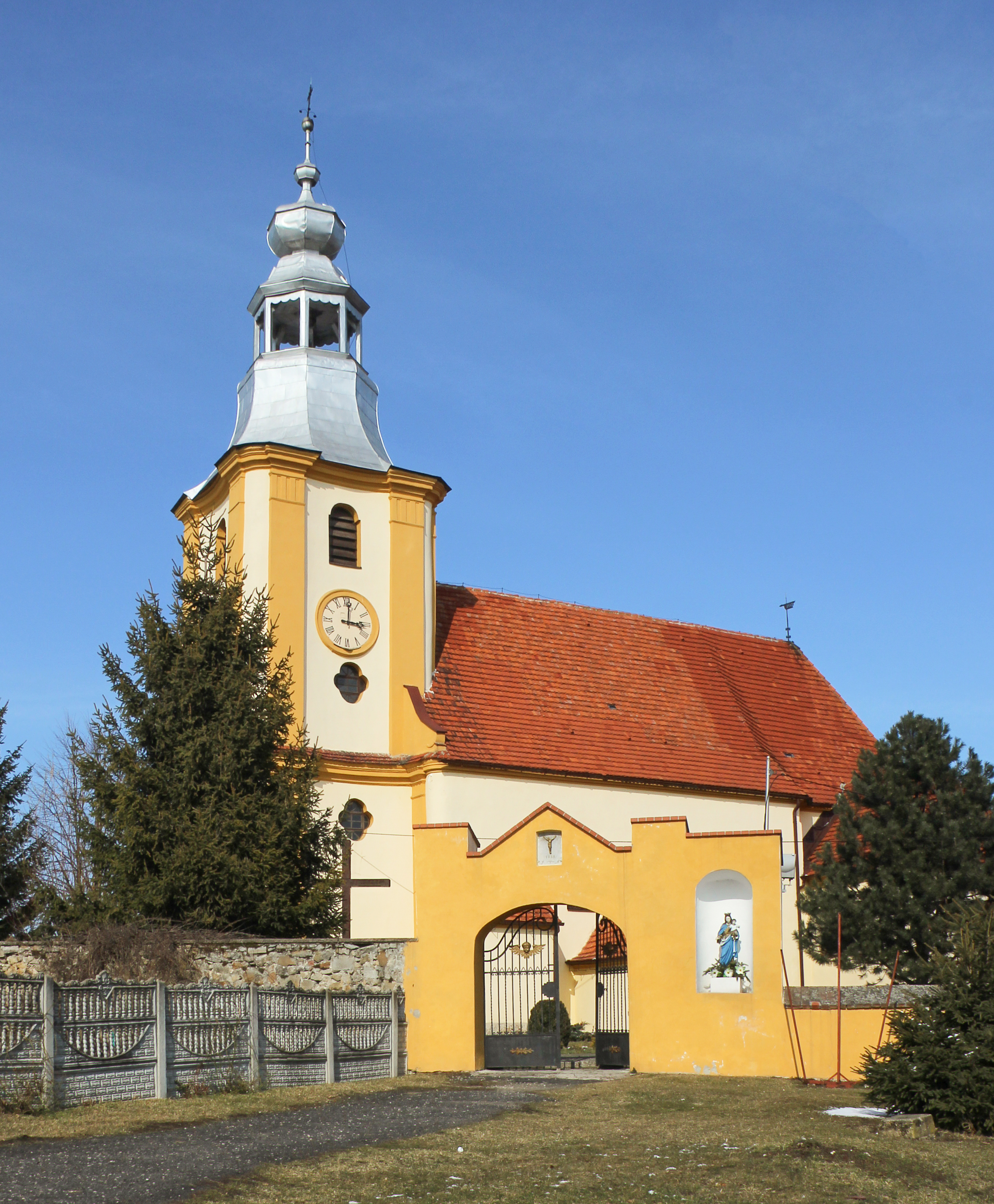
- Saint Catherine Church

- Location within Poland
- Coordinates: 50°23′21″N 17°12′33″E
- Country: Poland
- Voivodeship: Opole
- County: Nysa
- Gmina: Otmuchów
- Population: 407

Łąka [ˈwɔnka] (German: Wiesau) is a village in the administrative district of Gmina Otmuchów, within Nysa County, Opole Voivodeship, in south-western Poland, close to the Czech border.
