= Nysa County =

Nysa County Powiat nyski
- County
- Flag Coat of arms

- Location within the voivodeship
- Coordinates (Nysa): 50°28′17″N 17°20′2″E
- Country: Poland
- Voivodeship: Opole
- Seat: Nysa
- Gminas: Total 9: Gmina Głuchołazy; Gmina Kamiennik; Gmina Korfantów; Gmina Łambinowice; Gmina Nysa; Gmina Otmuchów; Gmina Paczków; Gmina Pakosławice; Gmina Skoroszyce

Area
  - Total: 1,223.87 km^{2} (472.54 sq mi)

Population (2019-06-30)
  - Total: 136,393
  - Density: 111.444/km^{2} (288.639/sq mi)
  - Urban: 73,232
  - Rural: 63,161
- Car plates: ONY
- Website: http://www.powiat.nysa.pl

Nysa County (Polish: powiat nyski) is a unit of territorial administration and local government (powiat) in Opole Voivodeship, south-western Poland, on the Czech border. It came into being on January 1, 1999, as a result of the Polish local government reforms passed in 1998. Its administrative seat and largest town is Nysa, which lies 48 kilometres (30 mi) south-west of the regional capital Opole. The county contains four other towns: Głuchołazy, 18 km (11 mi) south of Nysa, Paczków, 24 km (15 mi) west of Nysa, Otmuchów, 12 km (7 mi) west of Nysa, and Korfantów, 20 km (12 mi) east of Nysa.

The county covers an area of 1,223.87 square kilometres (472.5 sq mi). As of 2019 its total population is 136,393. The most populated towns are Nysa with 43,849 inhabitants, Głuchołazy with 13,534 inhabitants, and Paczków with 7,460 inhabitants.

== Neighbouring counties ==
Nysa County is bordered by Ząbkowice County to the west, Strzelin County and Brzeg County to the north, Opole County to the north-east, and Prudnik County to the south-east. It also borders the Czech Republic to the south-west.

== Administrative division ==
The county is subdivided into nine gminas (five urban-rural and four rural). These are listed in the following table, in descending order of population.

| Gmina | Type | Area (km^{2}) | Population (2019) | Seat |
|---|---|---|---|---|
| Gmina Nysa | urban-rural | 217.6 | 57,077 | Nysa |
| Gmina Głuchołazy | urban-rural | 167.2 | 23,707 | Głuchołazy |
| Gmina Otmuchów | urban-rural | 187.0 | 13,559 | Otmuchów |
| Gmina Paczków | urban-rural | 80.0 | 12,560 | Paczków |
| Gmina Korfantów | urban-rural | 179.3 | 8,803 | Korfantów |
| Gmina Łambinowice | rural | 121.6 | 7,494 | Łambinowice |
| Gmina Skoroszyce | rural | 104.2 | 6,219 | Skoroszyce |
| Gmina Pakosławice | rural | 74.0 | 3,508 | Pakosławice |
| Gmina Kamiennik | rural | 91.0 | 3,466 | Kamiennik |
