= Smoke tree (disambiguation) =

Smoke tree, or Smoketree, may refer to:

- Smoke tree, the common name of several plants
- Smoke Tree Ranch, a resort in Palm Springs, California
- Smoke Tree Range, a 1937 American western film
- Smoketree Elementary School, in Lake Havasu City, Arizona
- Smoketree Ranch, a recording studio in Chatsworth, California

== See also ==
- Smokebush
