= Smoke tree =

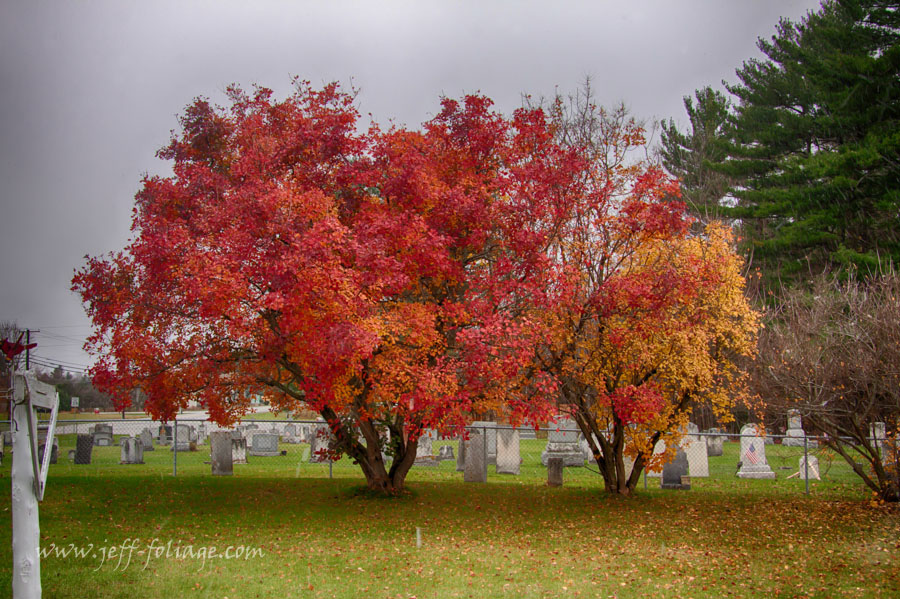
Cotinus obovatus in late autumn

Smoke tree, or smoketree, may refer to any of several plants, some of whose parts are finely divided and give the appearance of smoke from a distance:

- Cotinus, a genus of garden shrub commonly referred to as smoketrees.
  - Cotinus coggygria, the European or Eurasian smoketree
  - Cotinus obovatus, the American smoketree
- Psorothamnus spinosus, a legume tree of the American Mojave desert commonly referred to as the smoketree. In the spring it has vibrant purple blooms.
- Euphorbia cotinifolia, or tropical smoketree

== See also ==
- Smokebush
