= Otmuchów Castle =

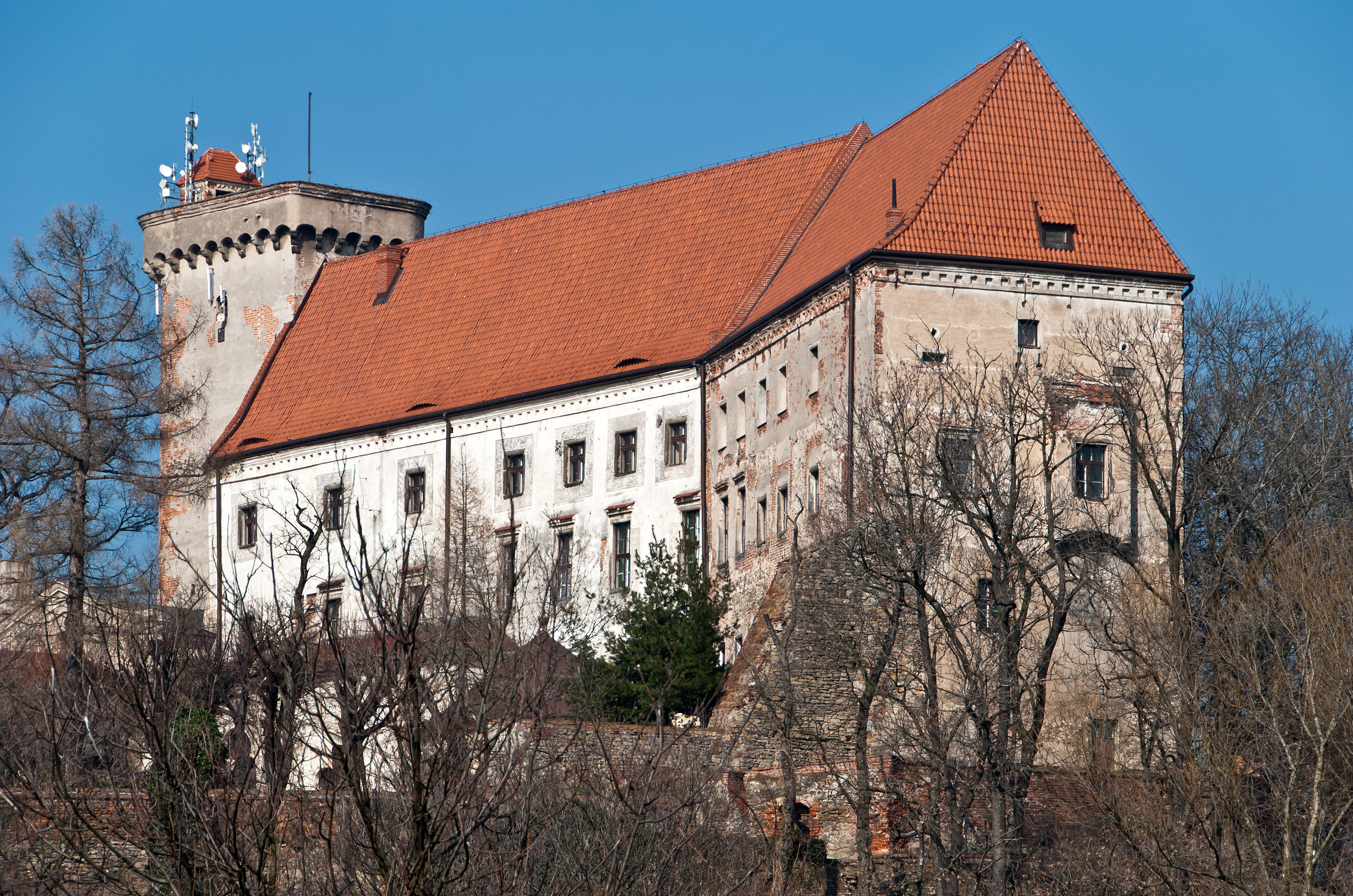
- Otmuchów Castle

- Location of the Otmuchów Castle in Poland Otmuchów Castle (Opole Voivodeship)
- 50°27′48″N 17°10′19″E
- Location: Otmuchów, Opole Voivodeship, in Poland

History
- Built: 1159
- Rebuilt: 1585–1596

Site notes
- Architectural style: Renaissance

Otmuchów Castle - a castle built in the Medieval Times, expanded in between 1585–1596 in the Renaissance architectural style, reconstructed in the seventeenth century into the Baroque architectural style, and the residence of the Bishop of Wrocław up until 1810. The castle is located in Otmuchów (68 km south-west of Opole), Opole Voivodeship; in Poland.

== History ==
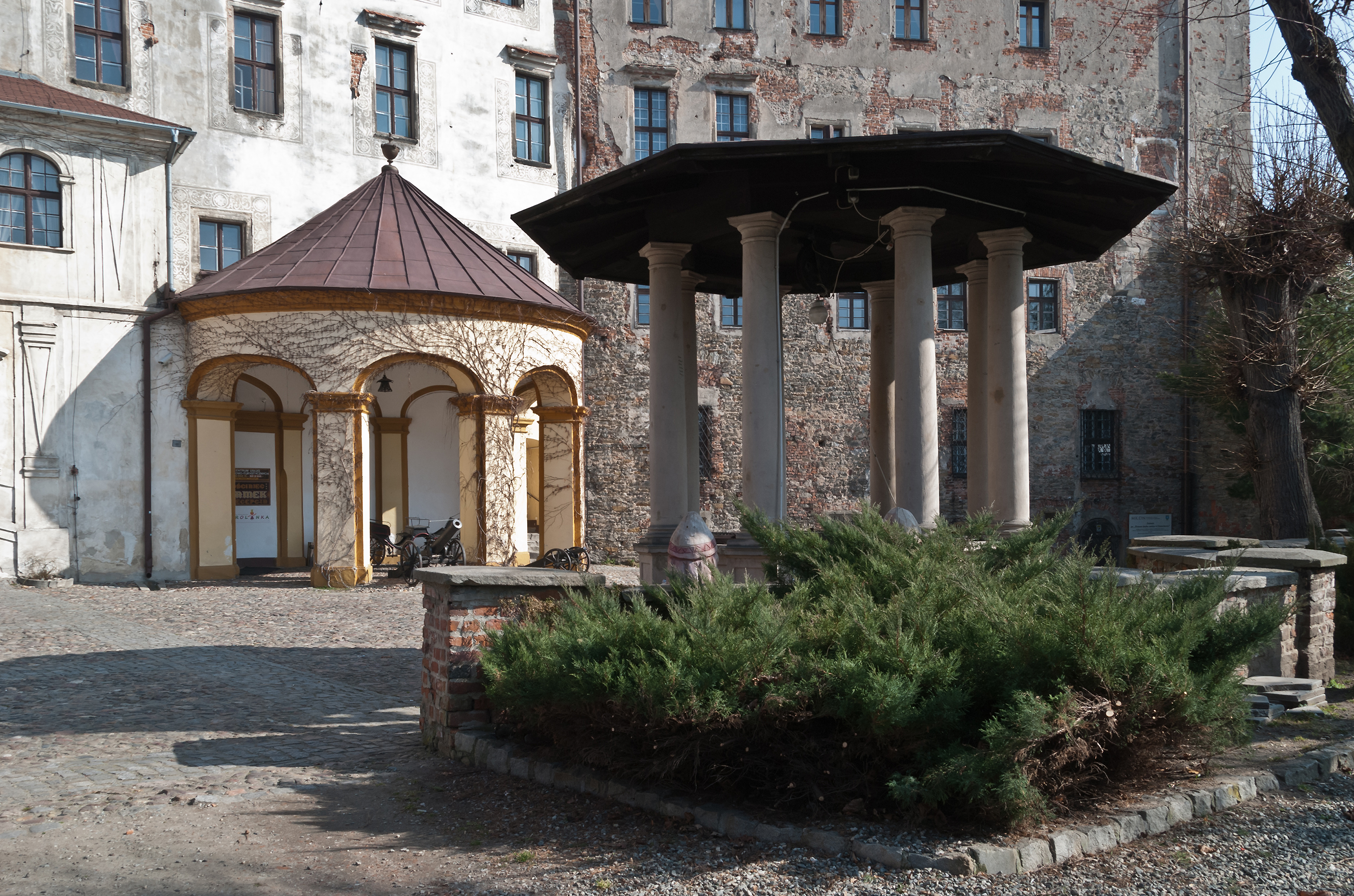
Courtyard

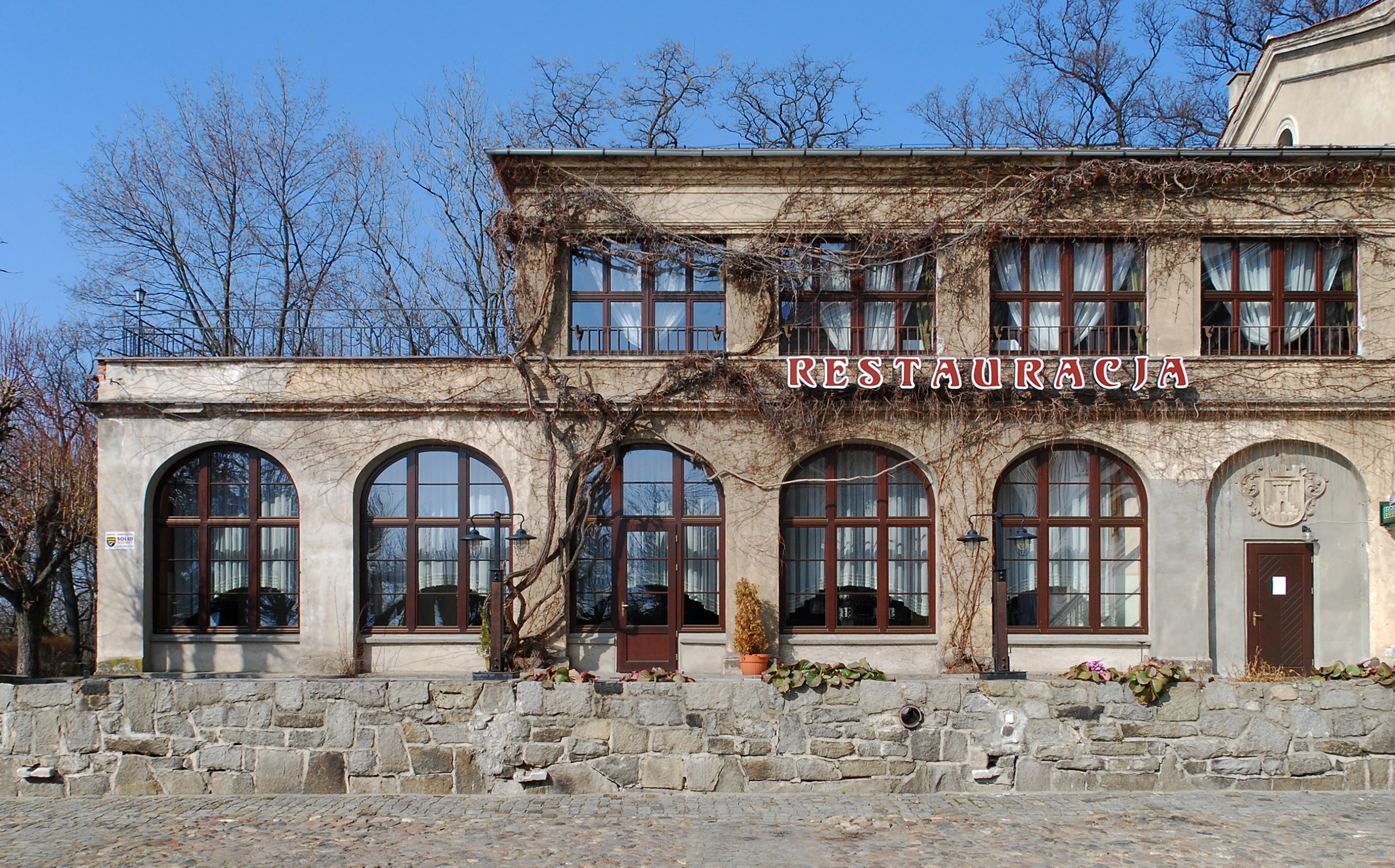
Arcades

The history of the Castle in Otmuchów dates back to the twelfth century, when Pope Hadrian gave authority to the land to the Bishop of Wrocław, including the castle. Throughout the next centuries the castle gained its significance, when Bishop Preczlaw of Pogarell called Otmuchów the capital of the Duchy of Bishops. The castle changed its architectural style to that of the Renaissance during reconstruction work in the seventeenth century. In 1810 the partially devastated south-eastern wing of the residence was deconstructed. Currently two wings of the castle survive, both having four levels.

After the secularisation in 1810, the castle was left in ruins, while the lands were given off to the powerful House of Humboldt; the Duke of Humboldt used the material from the former, other two wings to repair the currently standing reconstructed wings. In the location of the former wings, the owner built a small castle-garden, while his brother Alexander von Humboldt sent in exotic trees, such as the smoketree, ginkgo, or the Canadian lime tree. One of the most unusual parts of the residence's interior is located in the castle's two small cells of death, where prisoners were told to enter, and fall down a 20-metre drop, where there is a scripture Go you are free (Idź jesteś wolny, Polish); the sudden drop let to the stone courtyard with a sharpened birch perch.
