= Otmuchów Group =

- Company type: Joint-stock company
- Industry: Food
- Founded: 2010; 16 years ago
- Headquarters: Otmuchów, Poland
- Area served: Poland
- Key people: Mert Özden
- Products: Confectionery
- Net income: zl 278,000 (2016)
- Number of employees: 1420
- Website: www.grupaotmuchow.pl

Otmuchów Group is a corporate group of enterprises specialised in the food industry of confectioneries. The joint-stock company is registered on the Warsaw Stock Exchange. The headquarters of the dominating corporate unit is located in Otmuchów, Poland.

The Otmuchów Group handles the production, packaging and distribution of chocolate, chocolate biscuits, bonbonnieres, pastilles, sweets as well as oatmeals and corn flakes. The corporation specialises in the manufacture of food stuffs for the largest national and international retail chains in the domain of private label and business-to-business services. The corporation also manufactures and distributes under its own branding.

As of 2016, the corporate group numbers 502 employees in its partnership and 914 in the corporate group.

== Structure ==
The Otmuchów Group joint-stock company.

Otmuchów Group holds production plants in:

- Brzeg
- Nysa
- Otmuchów

=== Dependent companies ===
- ZPC Otmuchów S.A. is a confectionery production company, founded in 1952. The joiny-stock company employs around 550 people. The company specialises in the production of cakes, lollipops, sugar casting, gingerbread in a variety of formations (including glossed and chocolate). Between 1976 and 1982 the company became part of the Opolskie Zakłady Przemysłu Cukierniczego, with its headquarters located in Brzeg as part of PWC Odra S.A. The firm was privatised in 1993. Since 1997, the firm remains a joint-stock company based in Otmuchów. In March 2008, ZPC Otmuchów acquired 100% of shares in Victoria Sweet S.A. based in Gorzyczki.
- PWC Odra S.A. is a dependent joint-stock company founded in 1946, with its headquarters in Brzeg. The company specialises in confectionery products and remains one of the largest of such food industry companies in Poland, holding a 5% share in the national market. The firm regulates its quality control standards via the International Food Standard and the British Retail Consortium.

When PWC Odra was founded in 1946, the company produced caramel and sweet candy. Between 1948-1951 and 1957-1958, the company underwent expansion. During the first phase of expansion, the company introduced milk fudge candy (including Matylda branded krówki) and sesame chałwa. During the 1957–1958 second phase of expansion, the company introduced the production of chocolates and pastilles. Between 1970 and 1972, as the first company in the country, PWC Odra introduced chewing gum in a variety of shapes. Between 1975 and 1976, the company introduced a new line of chocolate candy.

PWC Odra was privatised in 1993. In March of the same year, the board of PWC Odra made the decision to become a private limited company. As such, on May 19, 1993 the firm was recorded on the company register. Since February 1994, the company began to function as the Przedsiębiorstwo Wyrobów Cukierniczych Odra Sp. z o.o. In 1996, the company introduced the production of Fructo pastilles and Mini caramel sweets. On 27 June 1998 after a meeting of the board of directors, the company became a joint-stock company.

- CSI Jedność is a confectionery company founded in 1949 and based in Grójec. The company specialises in milk and fudge candy, caramel and pastille sweets and diet supplements. The company regulates its quality control with ISO 22000: 2005 certification. The company produces krówki, caramel, Irysy candy, toffee and pastille sweets. The company also produces milk kaymak sweets.
- Aero Snack is a private limited company specialising in the production of Tip Top potato crips in a variety of flavours.

== Brands and products ==
- Bingo – roasted and salted assortment of nuts, breadsticks and crisps.
- Crunchers – crisp crackers.
- Free Food – jelly beans, dried fruit and oatmeal snack bars, protein cocoa snack bars.
- Mr. Froots – jelly beans and fruit snack bars.
- Multigrain Quinoa Snacks – crisp crackers.
- Odra – caramel candy, chocolates, jelly, bonbonnieres, milk fudge (i.e. krówki), jelly beans, pralines, Ptasie Mleczko, chałwa in a variety of flavours and sesame crackers.
- Otmuchów – cornflakes.
