= Otmuchów =

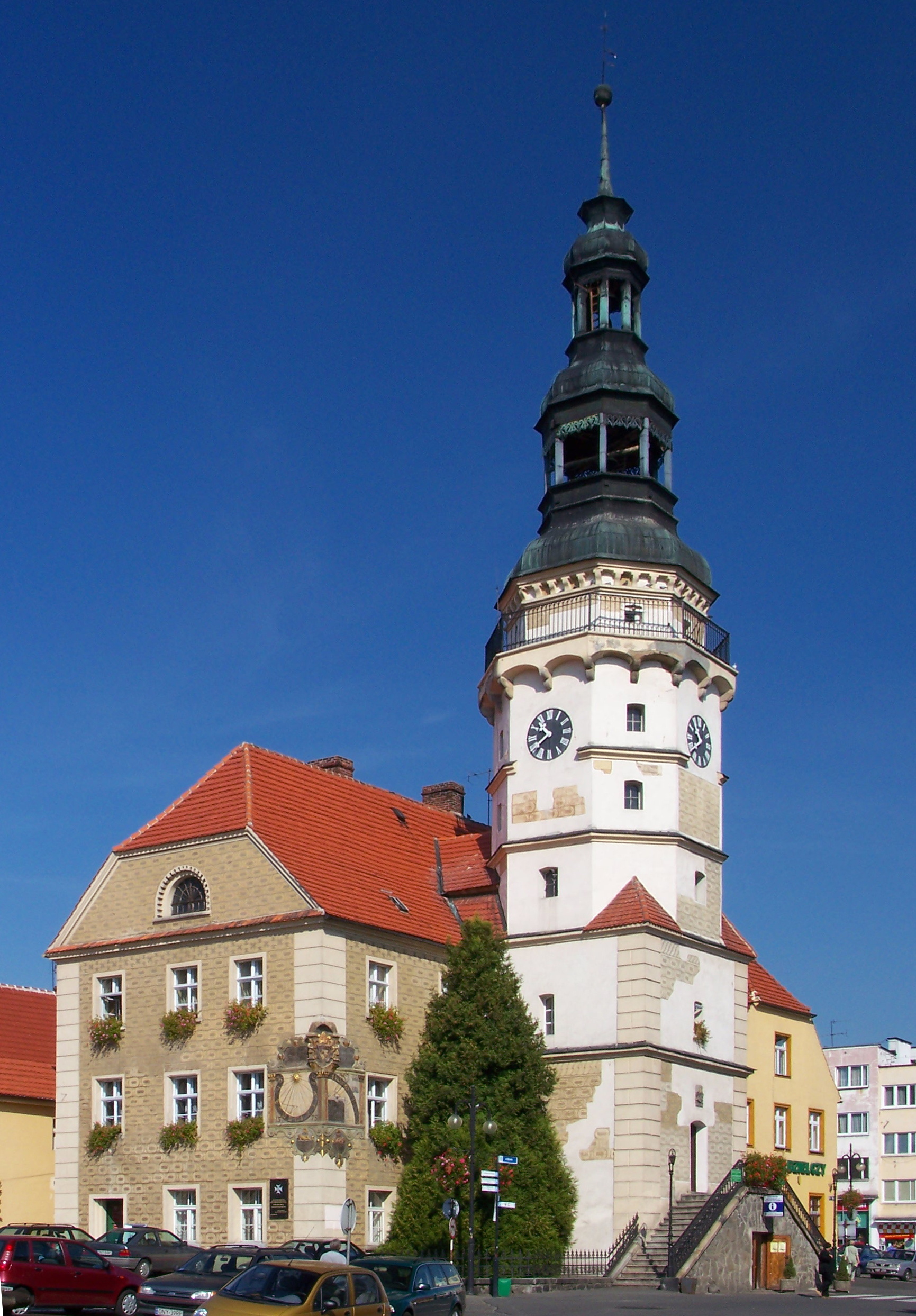
- Town Hall

- Coat of arms

- Location within Poland
- Coordinates: 50°28′0″N 17°10′30″E
- Country: Poland
- Voivodeship: Opole
- County: Nysa
- Gmina: Otmuchów
- Town rights: 1347

Government
  - Mayor: Damian Nowakowski (PiS)

Area
  - Total: 27.83 km^{2} (10.75 sq mi)
- Elevation: 220 m (720 ft)

Population (2019-06-30)
  - Total: 6,581
  - Density: 236.5/km^{2} (612.5/sq mi)
- Time zone: UTC+1 (CET)
  - Summer (DST): UTC+2 (CEST)
- Postal code: 48-385
- Car plates: ONY
- Website: http://www.otmuchow.pl

Otmuchów (pronounced: [ɔtˈmuxuf]; German: Ottmachau) is a town in Nysa County, Opole Voivodeship, in southern Poland, with 6,581 inhabitants (2019).

== Etymology ==
The city was mentioned for the first time as Otemochow in 1155. It was named in its Old Polish form Othmuchow in the 13th-century Book of Henryków. The name Othmuchow was also listed in the Chronicles of the Kingdom of Poland written in the years 1455-1480 by Jan Długosz and the Latinized name Othmuchouie appeared in the Statuta synodalia episcoporum Wratislaviensium from 1475.

In 1613 the Silesian regionalist and historian Nicholas Henkel stated in his own work entitled Fri Silesiographia two names in Latin, Otmuchovia and Othmuchaw.

The Germanized form was Ottmachau, and the Polish name in the modern Polish spelling was restored in 1945.

== History ==
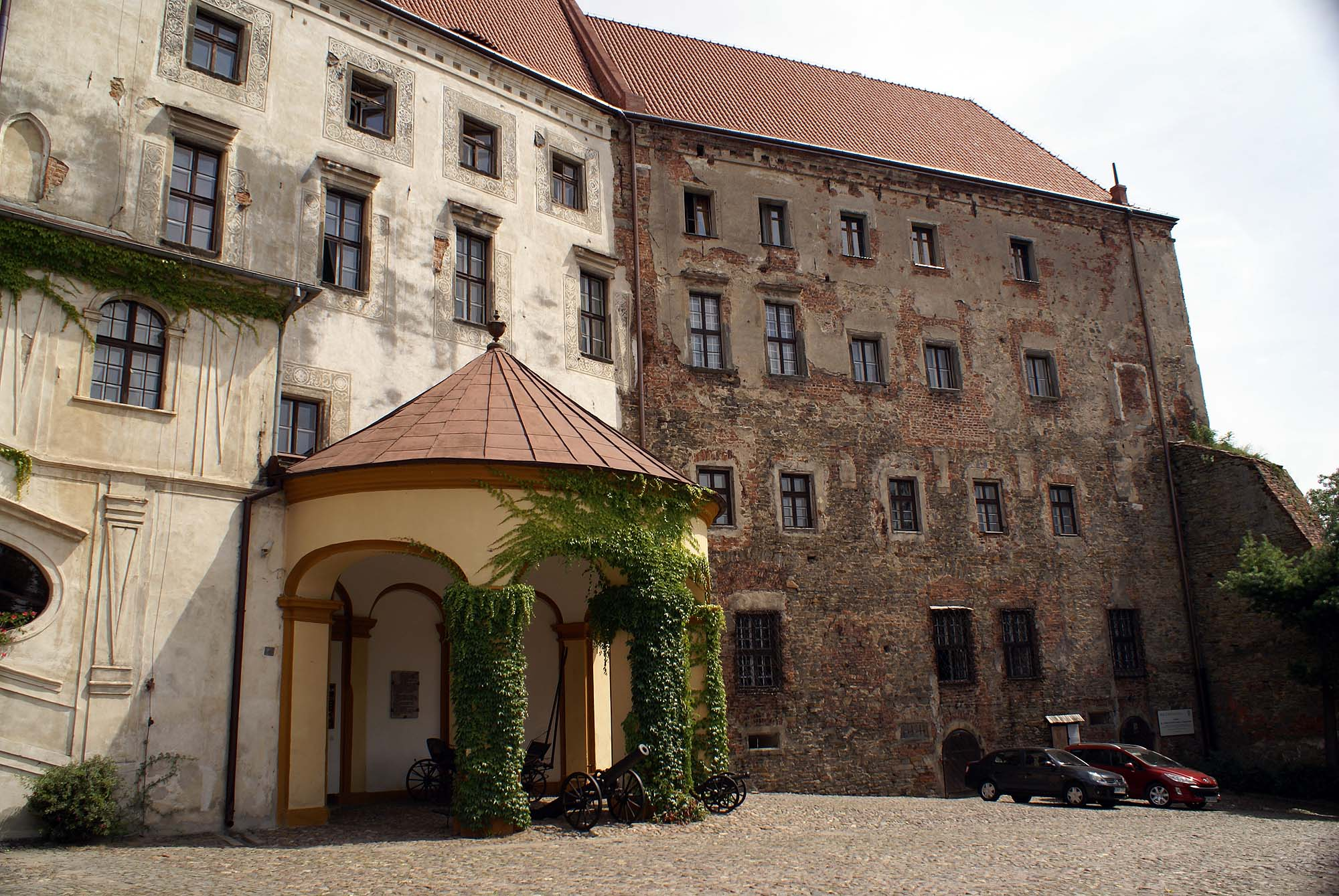
Medieval Otmuchów Castle

The first known mentioning of Otmuchów comes from 1155, however, it certainly existed, along with the castle, already in the 11th century. It was a seat of a castellany within medieval Poland ruled by the Piast dynasty. It was a property of the Diocese of Wrocław and a result of the fragmentation of Poland, it formed part of the Duchy of Nysa. In the 14th century the city was surrounded by defensive walls. Establishment of the coat of arms of the city dates back to 1347, when Bishop of Wrocław Przecław of Pogorzela vested Otmuchów with town rights. The coat of arms is an open city gate in white on a blue field. From the 14th century it was used as the town seal. Destroyed by many wars throughout history, the town lost its importance due to a nearby developing city of Nysa, which was the capital of the principality of the bishop. In 1428, 1430 and 1443 the town was captured by the Hussites. In the 15th century conflicts occurred between indigenous Poles and German settlers. Germans tried to oust the Polish language from local churches. Local Polish church superior lodged a complaint against a German priest who threatened to expel Poles from the church.

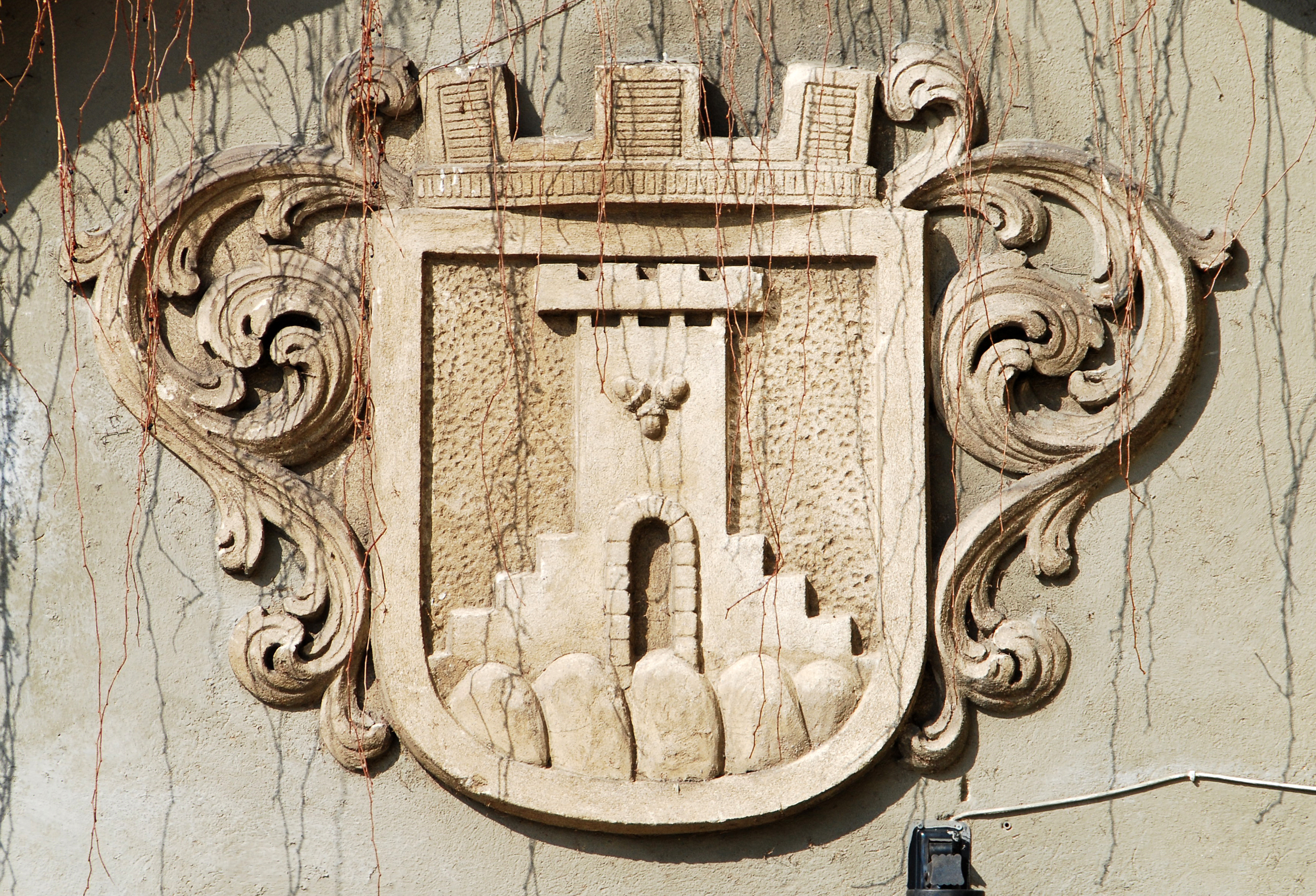
Otmuchów coat of arms at the medieval castle

The town was plundered during the Thirty Years' War. After the war the town was revived thanks to Polish prince and Bishop of Wrocław Karol Ferdynand Vasa, who turned the castle into an episcopal seat. In 1741 the town was captured and plundered by the Prussians, who annexed it afterwards. The town declined, and after secularization in 1810 it passed from episcopal authority under Prussian administration.

During the Second World War, the German Nazi regime operated two forced labour subcamps (E276, E282) of the Stalag VIII-B/344 prisoner-of-war camp for English-speaking POWs in the town. In 1944 the men were transferred to the oil refinery at Trzebinia (E738). The Germans also established and operated the Polenlager 86 forced labour camp for Poles in the town. 36 Polish citizens were murdered by Nazi Germany in the town during the war. Following the defeat of Germany in the war, the town became again part of Poland.

== Economy ==
The town holds the headquarters for the 1952 founded confectionery joint-stock company Otmuchów Group.

== Sights ==
Among the historic sights of Otmuchów are the medieval Otmuchów Castle, the Baroque palace, now housing the municipal government, medieval town walls, the Church of St. Nicholas and St. Francis, and numerous historic townhouses.

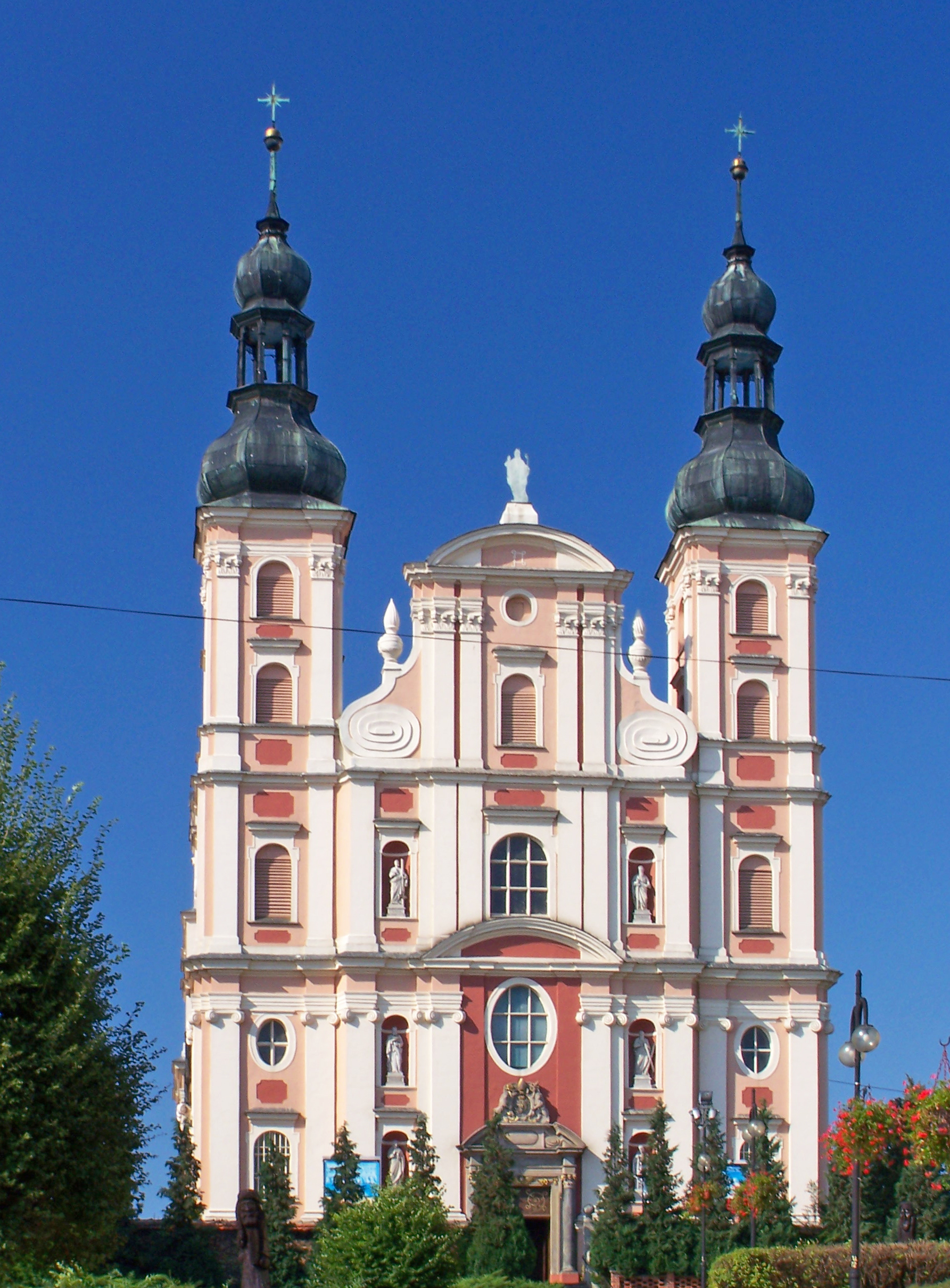
Church. St. Nicholas and St. Francis

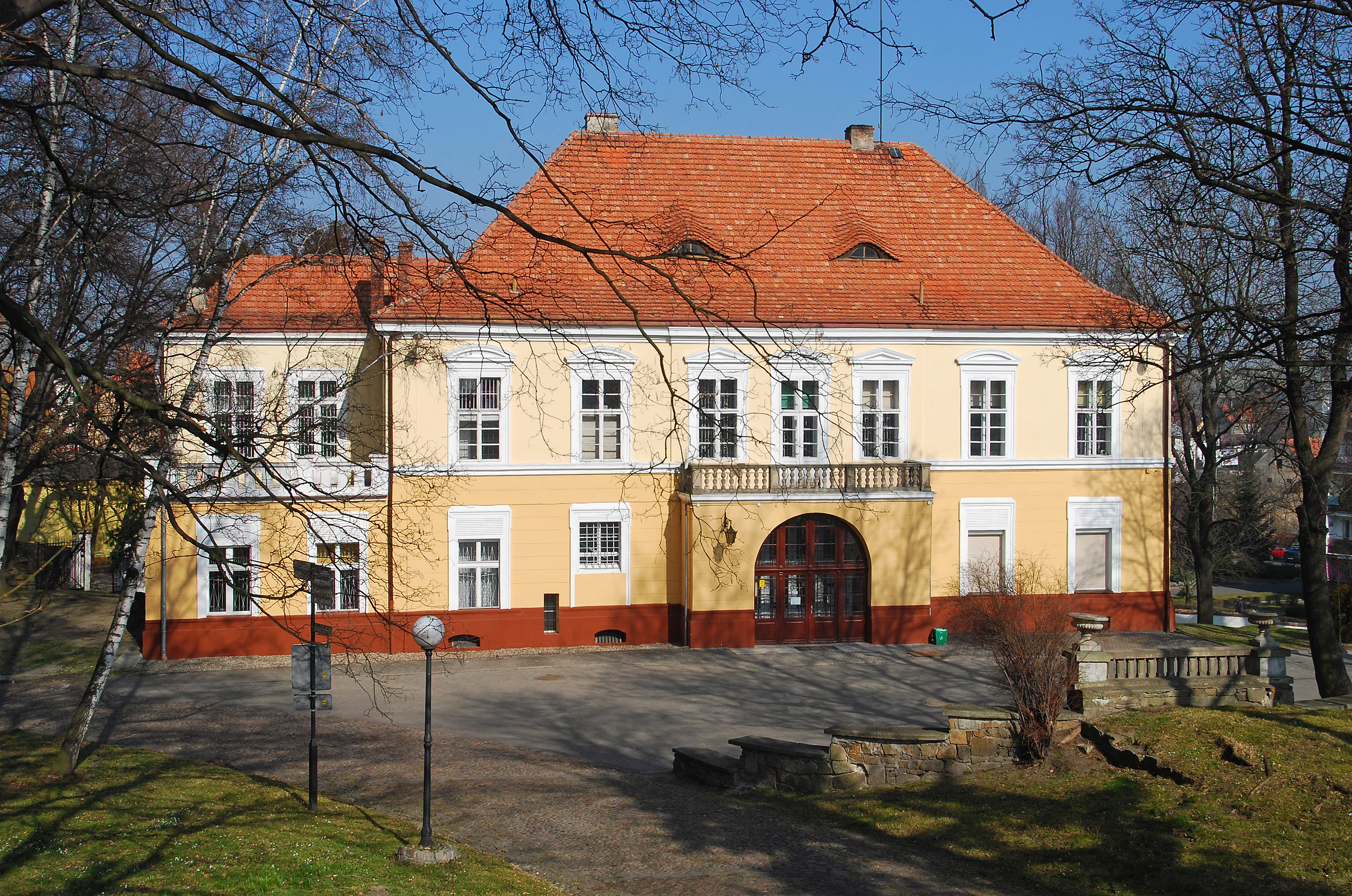
Municipal Office

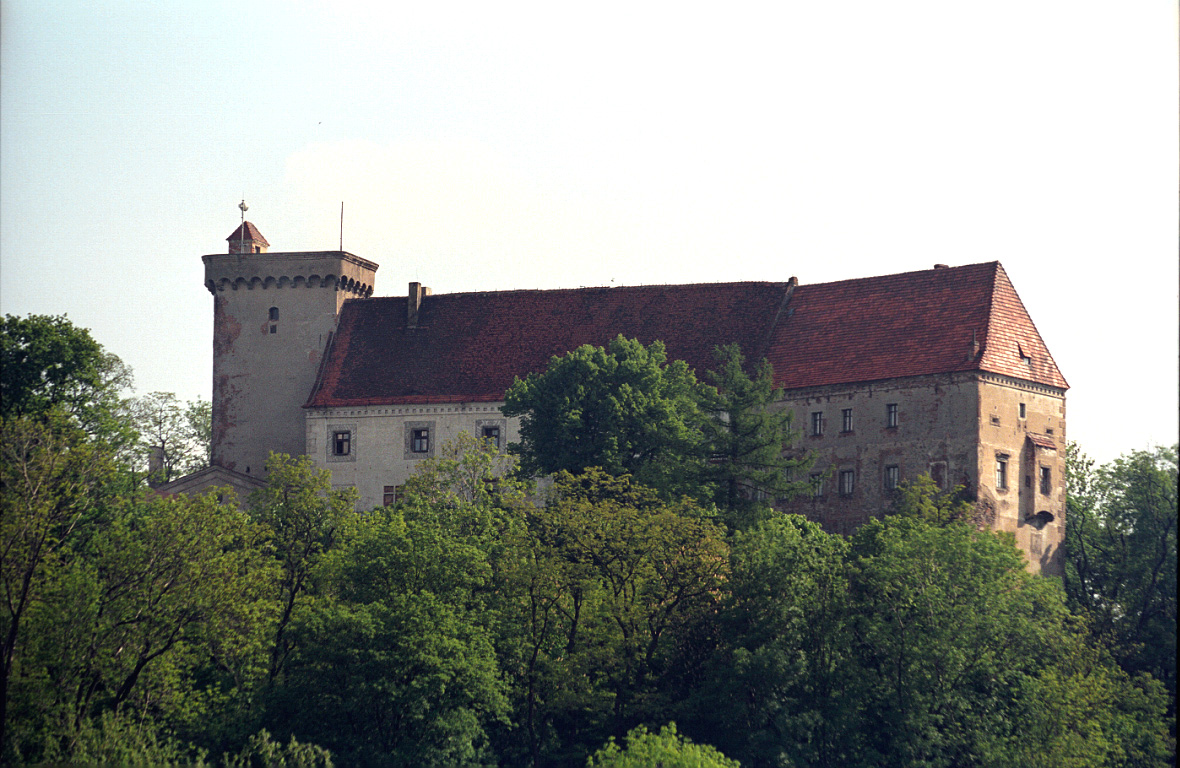
Otmuchów Castle

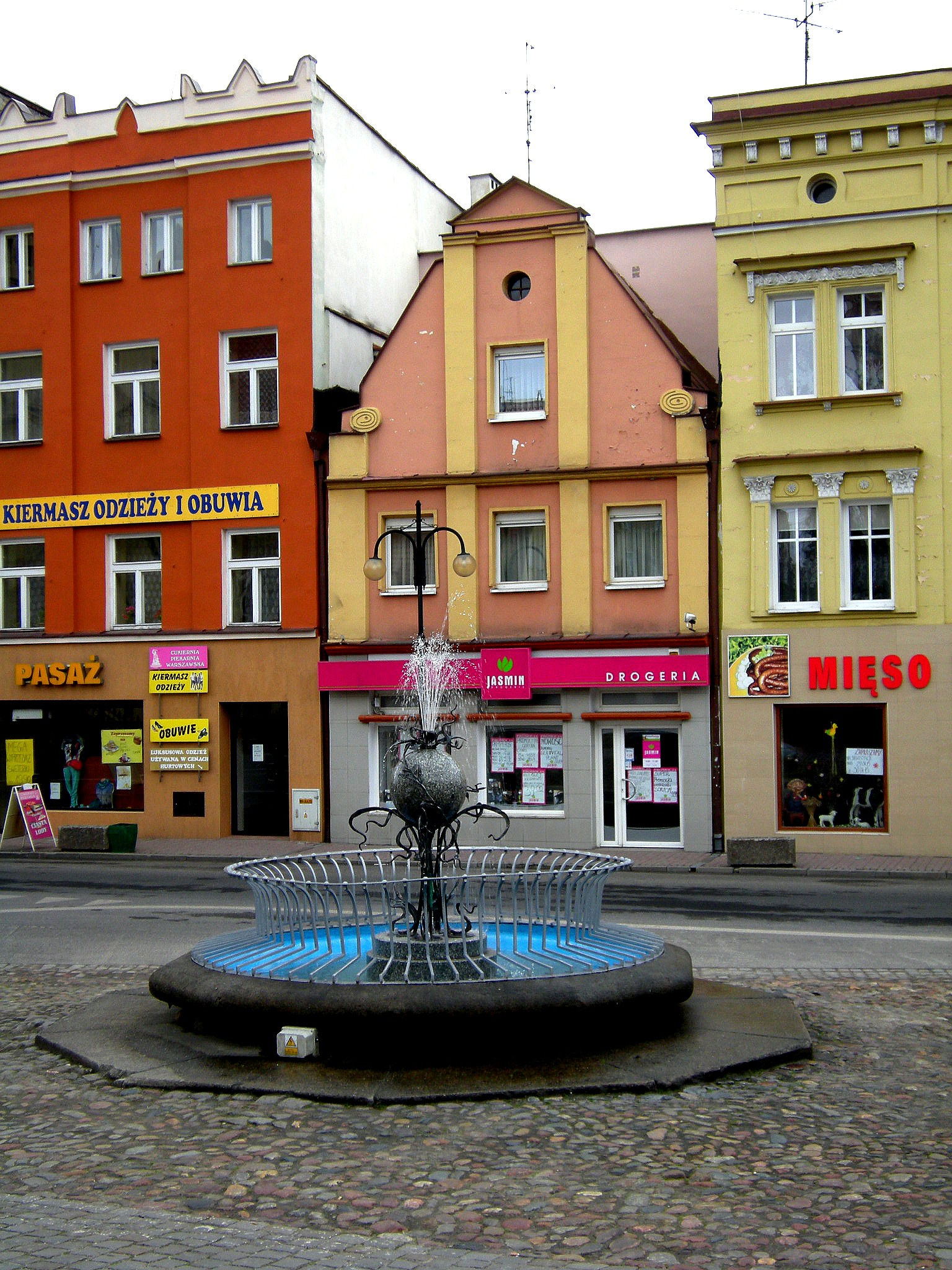
Market Square

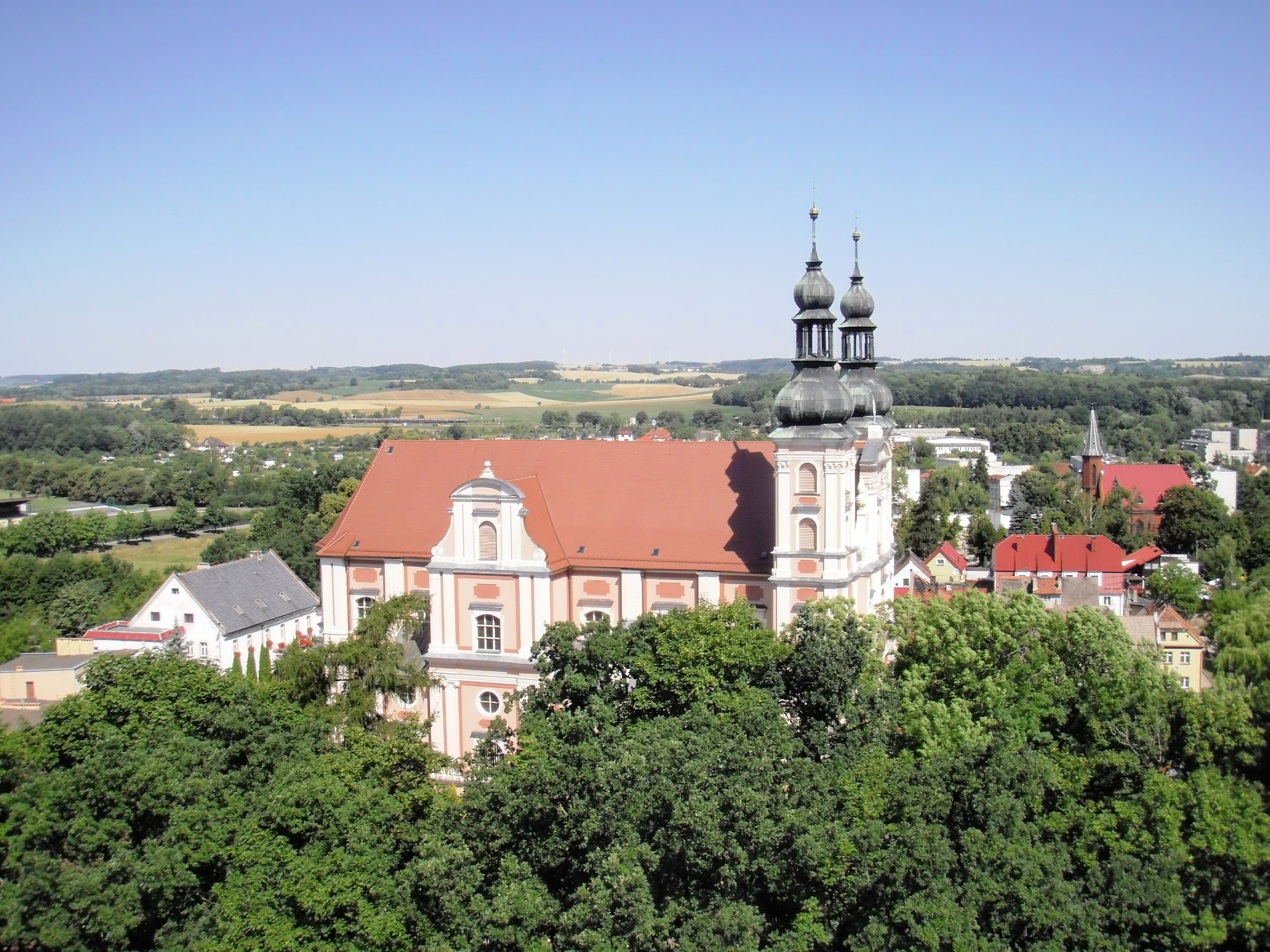
Panorama

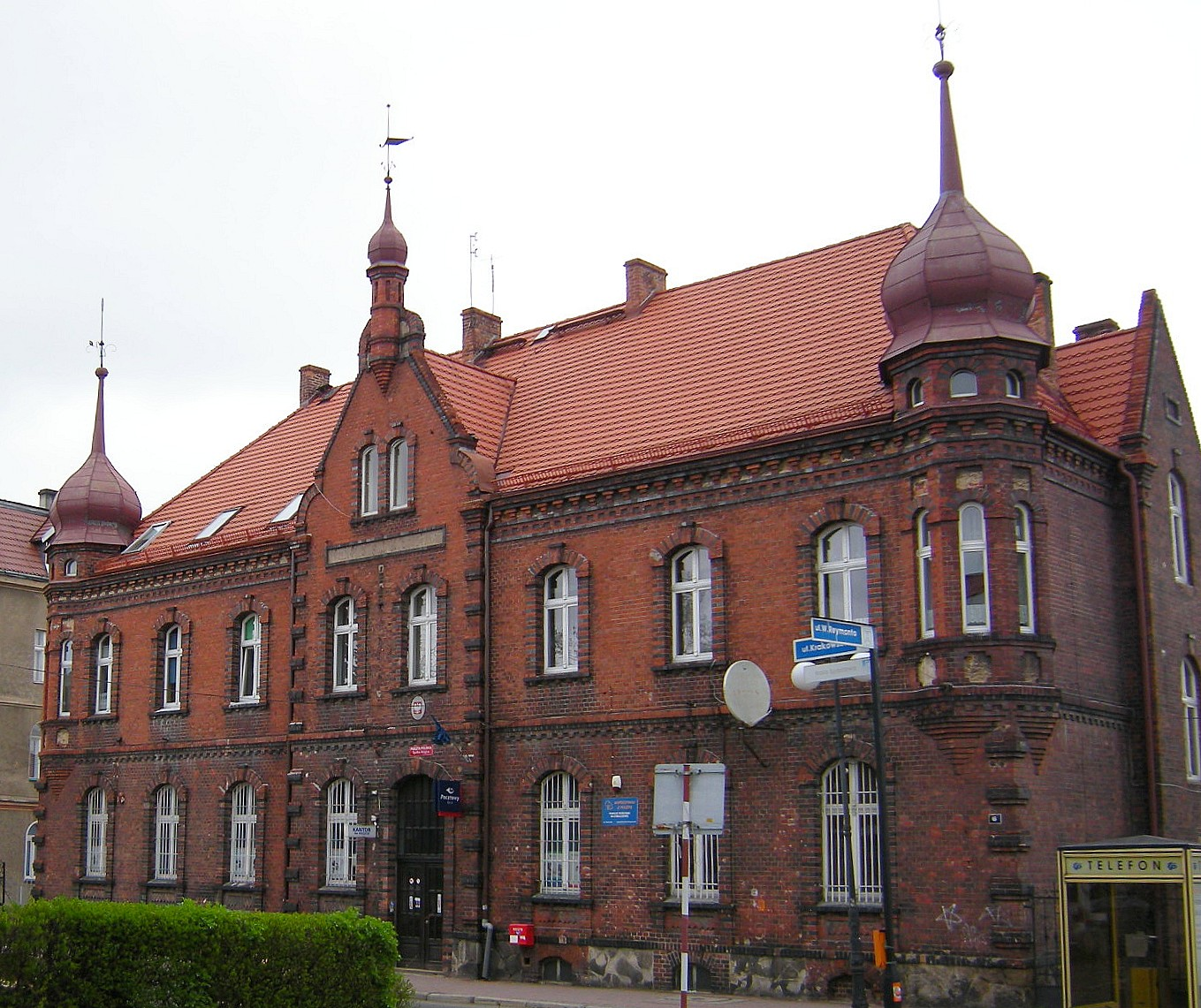
Post Office

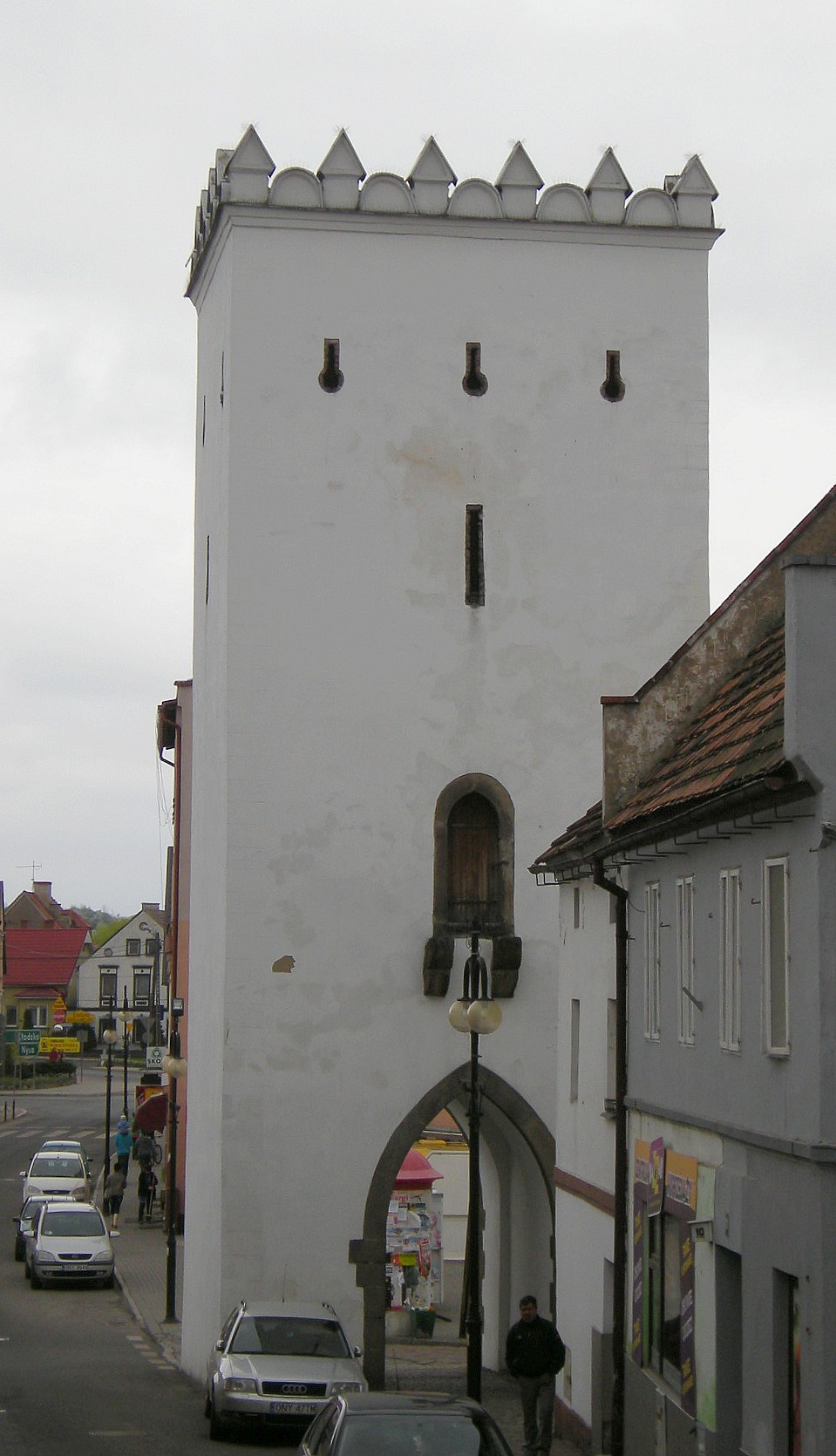
Nyska Wieża Wróbla (Defensive tower, part of the city walls)

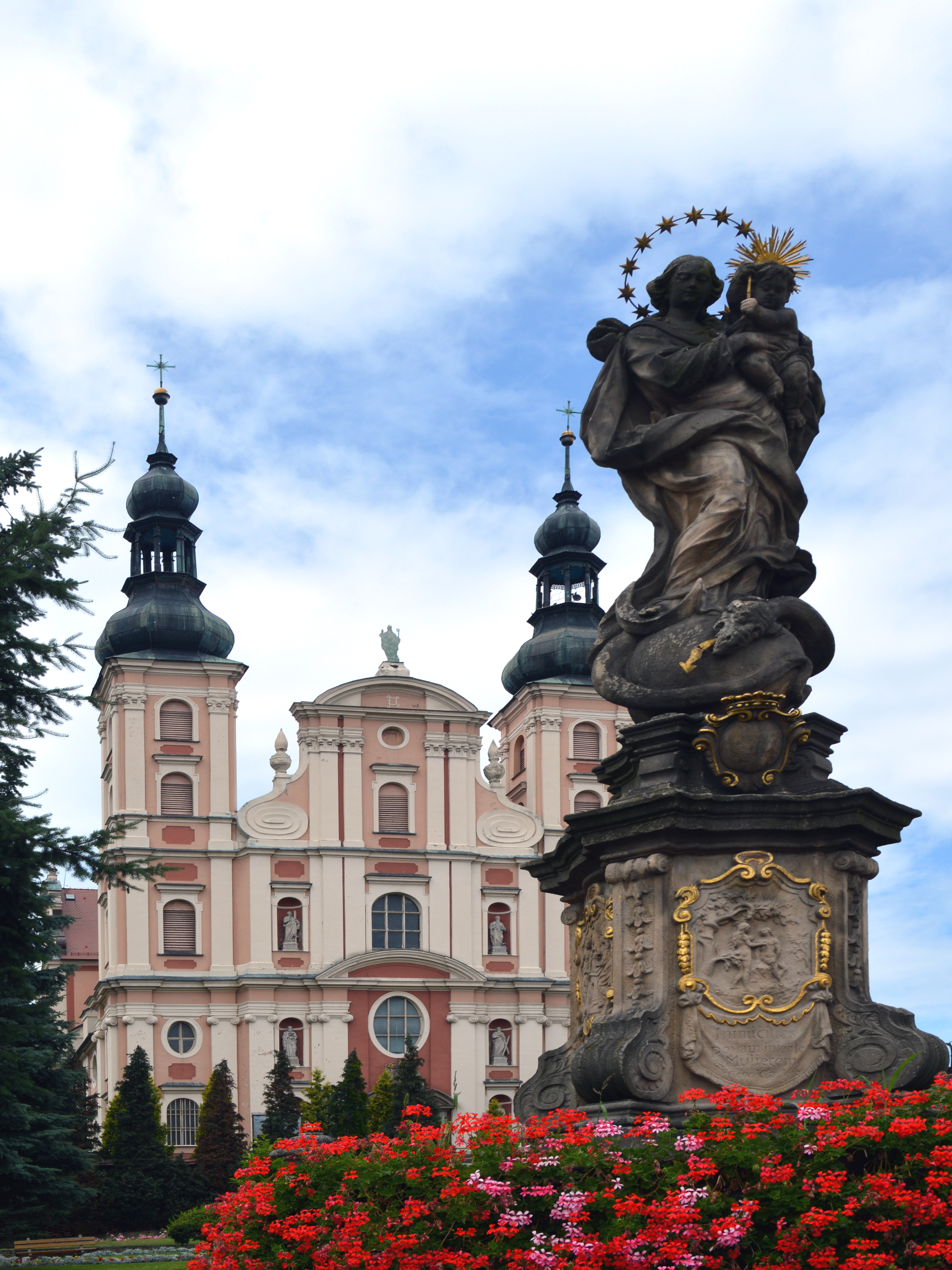
Baroque St. Mary column

== Transport ==
There is a train station in Otmuchów, and the Polish National road 46 also passes through the town.

== Sports ==
The local football team is Czarni Otmuchów. It competes in the lower leagues.

== Twin towns – sister cities ==
See twin towns of Gmina Otmuchów.
