= Otmuchów Town Hall =

Ratusz w Otmuchowie (Otmuchów Town Hall)
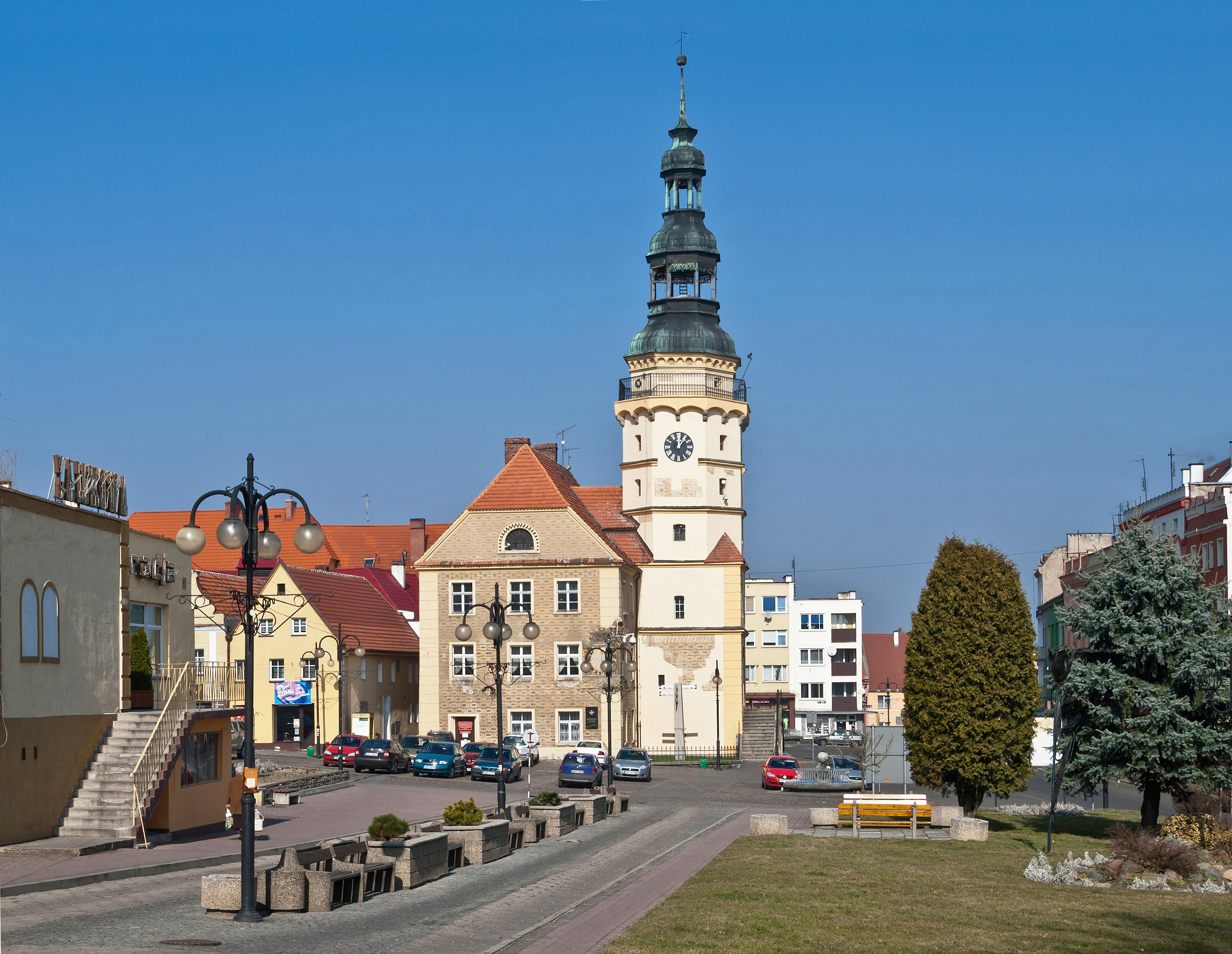
- Otmuchów Town Hall

General information
- Type: Town hall
- Architectural style: Renaissance
- Location: Otmuchów, Poland
- Coordinates: 50.4652°N 17.1729°E
- Completed: 1538

Otmuchów Town Hall is a Polish Renaissance building built in 1538, with the tower in 1604. In the later years the town hall was renovated and restored numerous times, and in between 1973 and 1976 underwent extensive renovation and restoration. Currently, the town hall is the seat of the Otmuchów City Council.

== History ==
The town hall was raised in 1538, funded by Bishop of Wrocław Jakub von Salza. The tower was built in 1604, financed by Bishop Jan VI von Sitsch. In 1678, the town hall was renovated, and in the years 1828, 1921, and 1933 underwent reconstructions. The town hall was renovated and restored between 1973 and 1976.

== Gallery ==
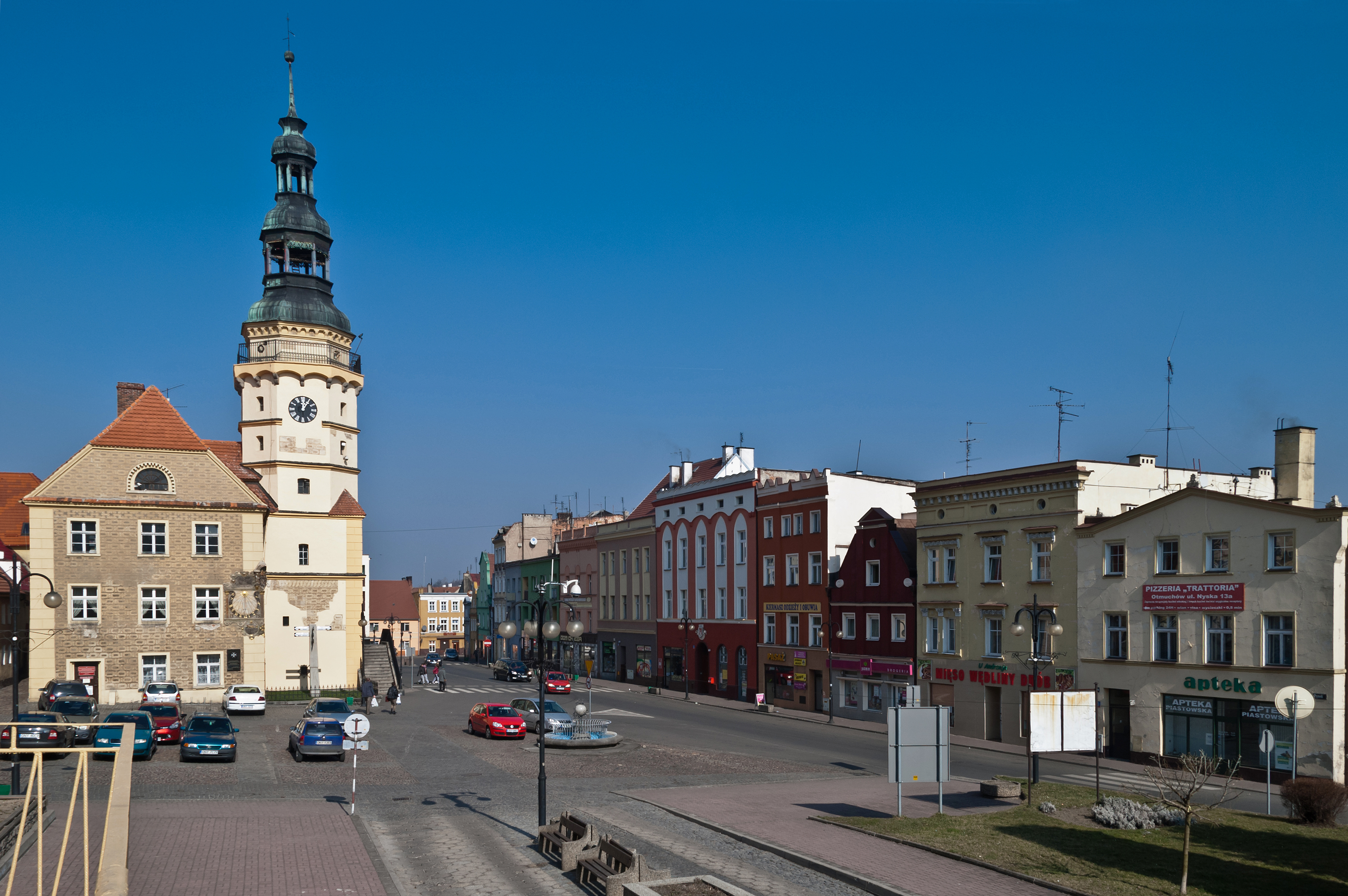

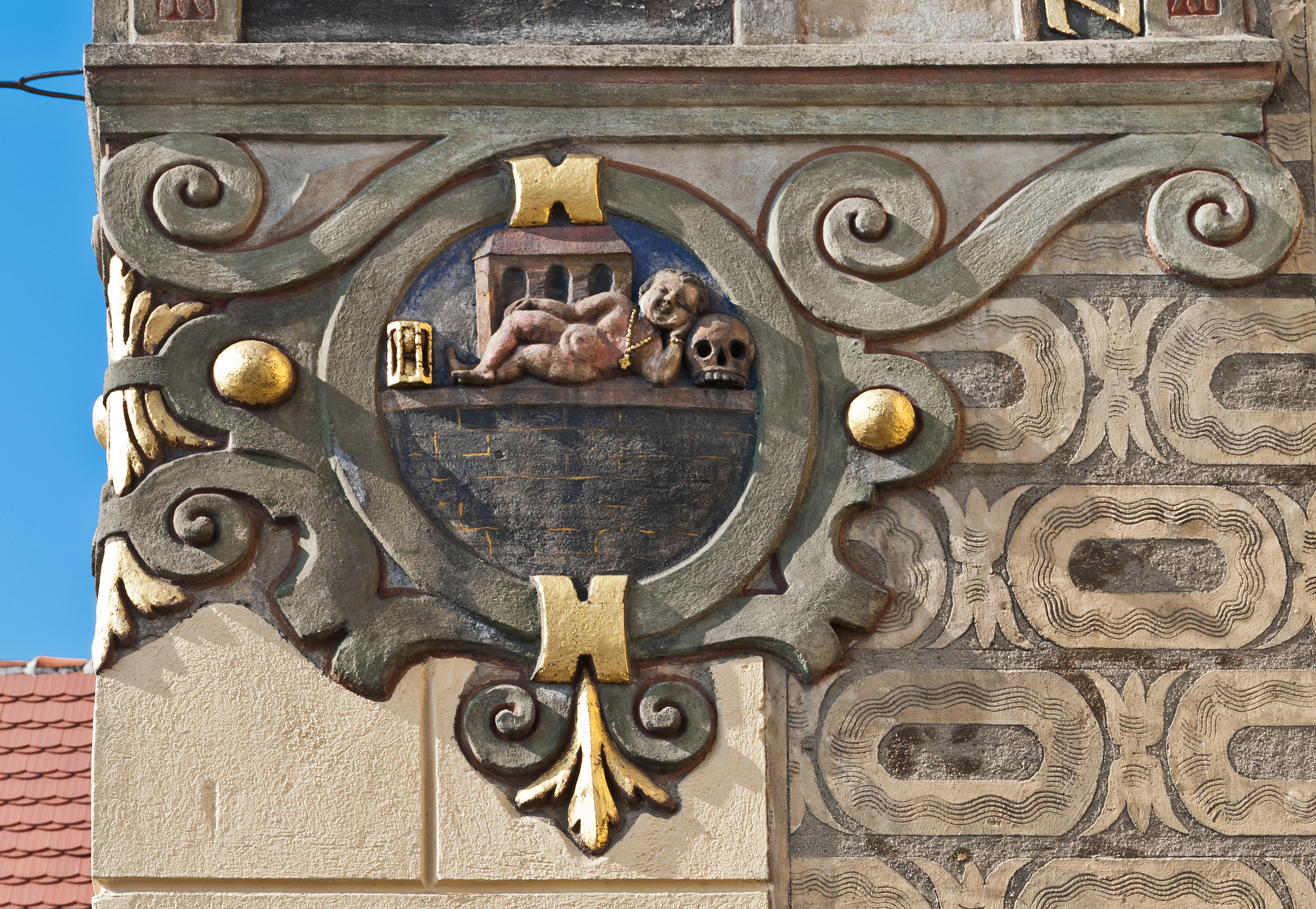

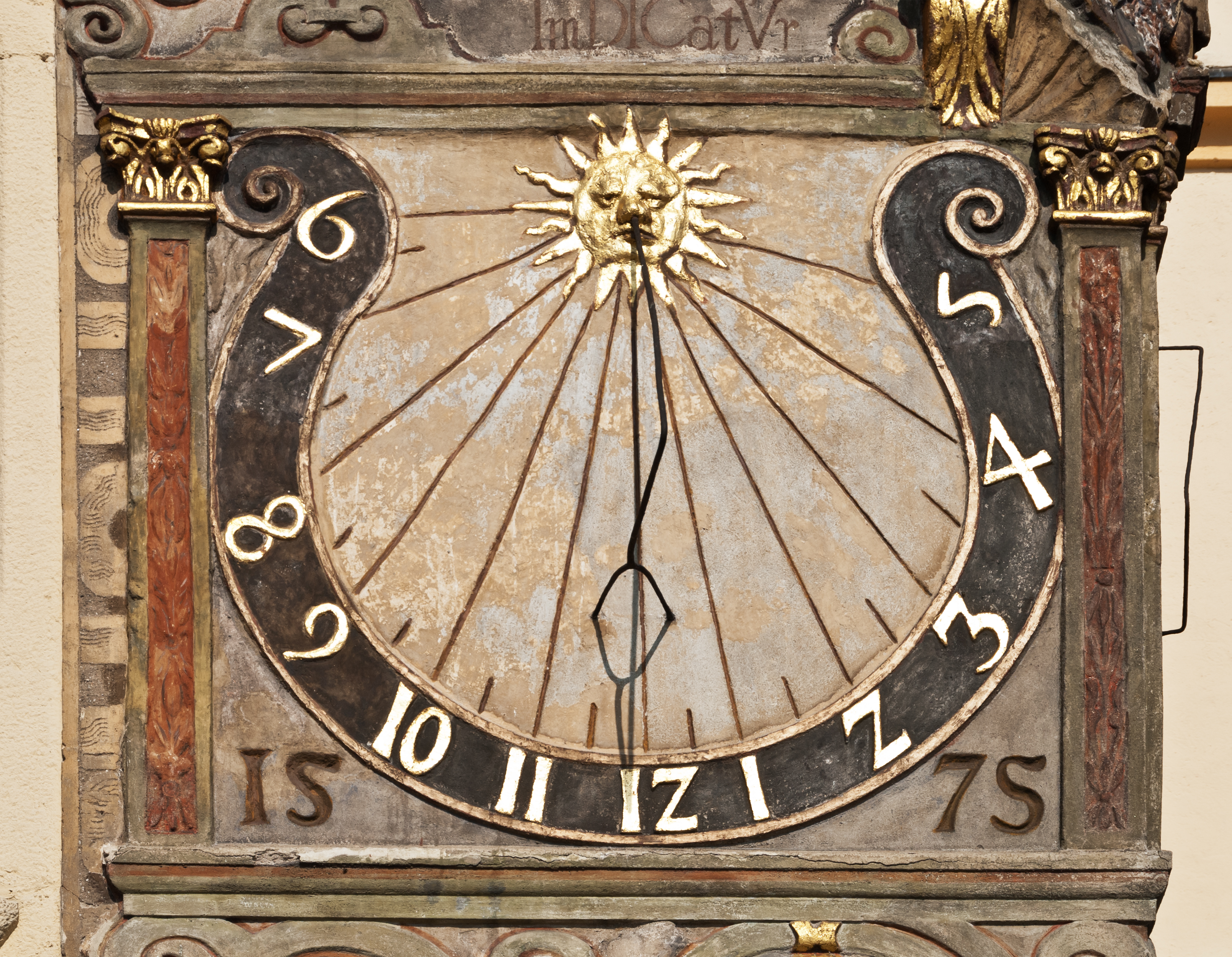
