= Smokebush =

Smokebush may refer to

- the plant genus Conospermum;
- the plant genus Cotinus (as "Smoke bush");
- the plant species Ptilotus obovatus;
- the plant species Adenanthos sericeus, but only in the cut flower industry;
- the plant species Buddleja madagascariensis;
- the plant species "Koeberlinia spinosa".

See also
Smoke tree
