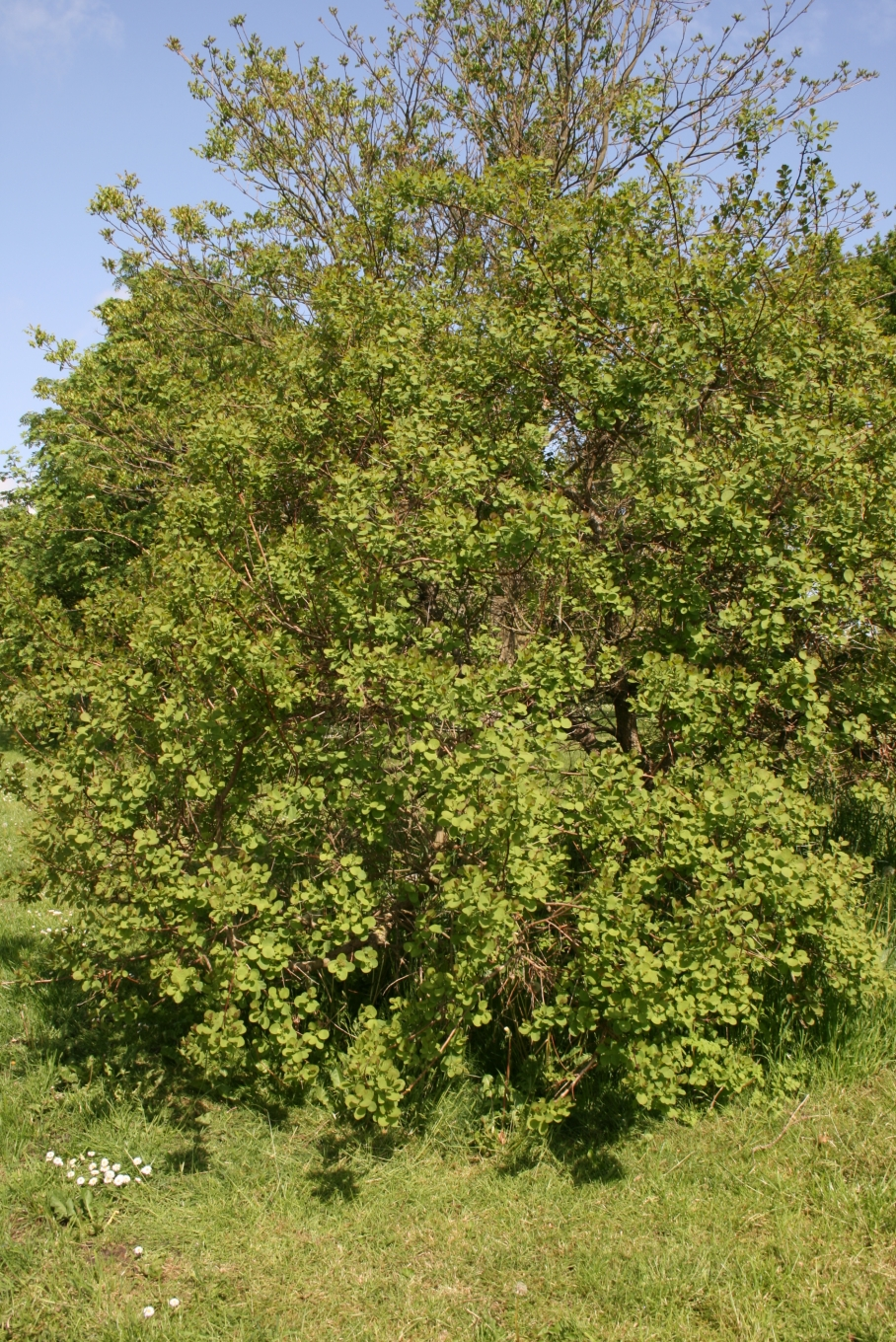
- Cotinus obovatus at Aarhus Botanical Gardens

Conservation status
- Least Concern (IUCN 3.1)

Scientific classification
- Kingdom: Plantae
- Clade: Tracheophytes
- Clade: Angiosperms
- Clade: Eudicots
- Clade: Rosids
- Order: Sapindales
- Family: Anacardiaceae
- Genus: Cotinus
- Species: C. obovatus

Binomial name
- Cotinus obovatus Raf.
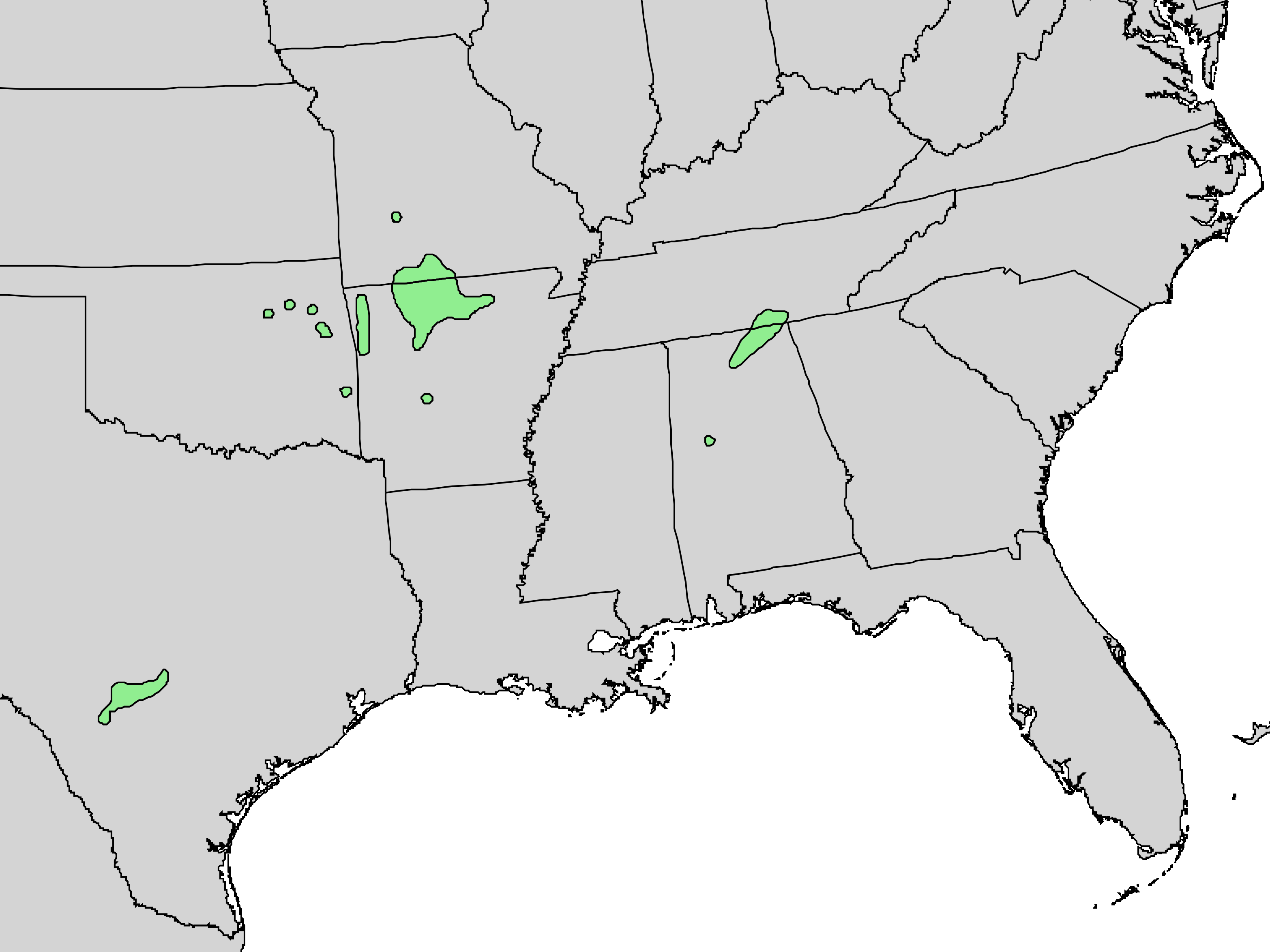
- Natural range of Cotinus obovatus

= Cotinus obovatus =

Species of flowering plant

Autumn colour at dusk of Champion Tree, Kew Gardens

Autumn colour back-lit by low Autumn sun. Kew Gardens

Cotinus obovatus syn. C. americanus, the American smoketree, chittamwood or American smokewood, is a rare species of flowering plant in the genus Cotinus of the family Anacardiaceae, native to scattered locations in Oklahoma, Texas, Arkansas, Missouri, Alabama and Tennessee. It is a deciduous, conical shrub growing to 10 m (33 ft) tall by 8 m (26 ft) broad, with oval leaves up to 12 cm (5 in) long. It produces panicles of pink-grey flowers in summer, and its foliage turns a brilliant scarlet in autumn; considered by many to be the most intense fall color of any tree. The smokey effect derives from the clusters of hairs on the spent flower stalks. It is highly sought after and cultivated in botanical gardens worldwide. It is dioecious, with male and female flowers on separate plants.

The Latin specific epithet obovatus means "in the shape of an inverted egg", and refers to the broadly obovate shape of the leaves. The heartwood is a bright yellow. The species does not appear to be in danger of facing extinction in the wild.

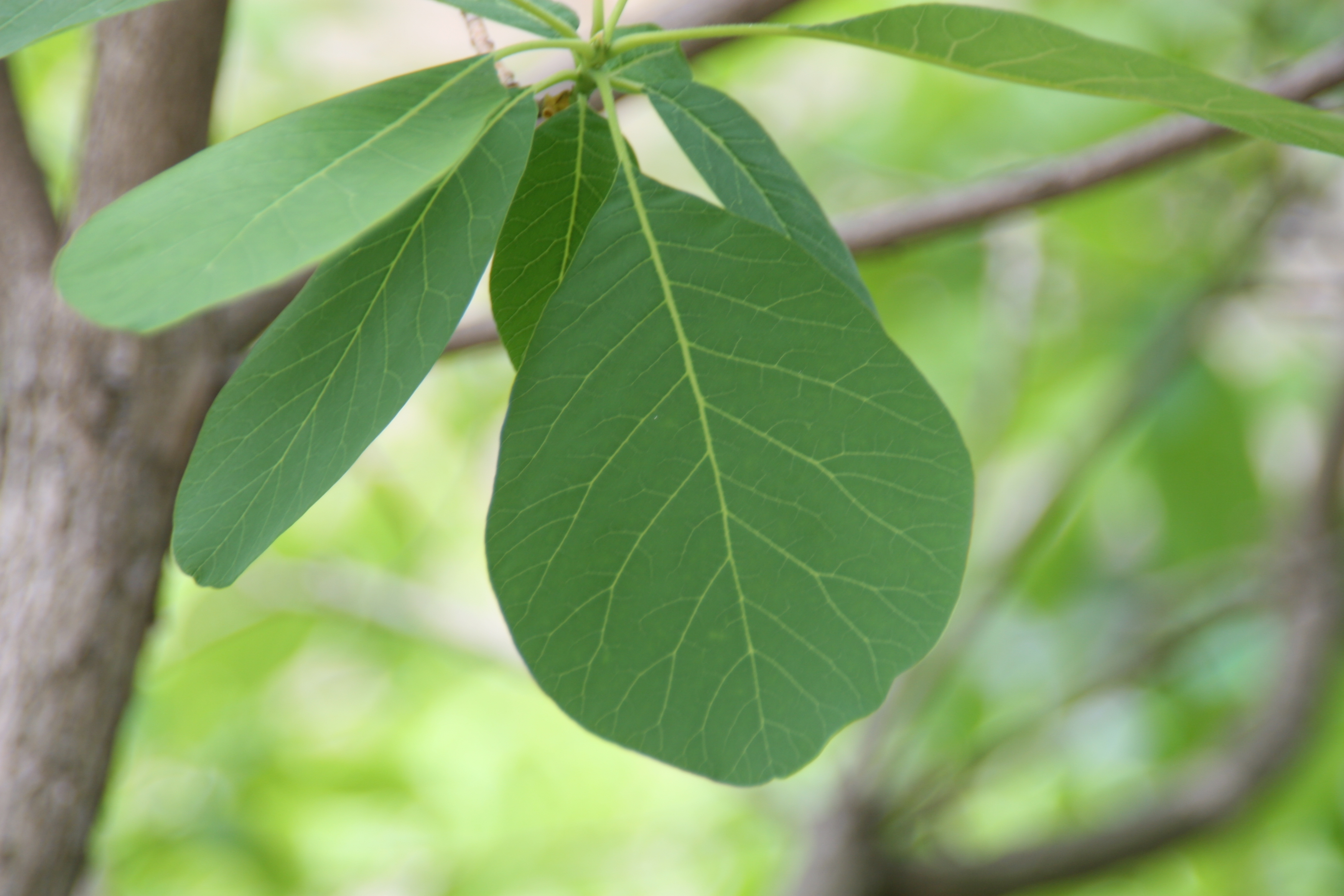
Cotinus obovatus leaves

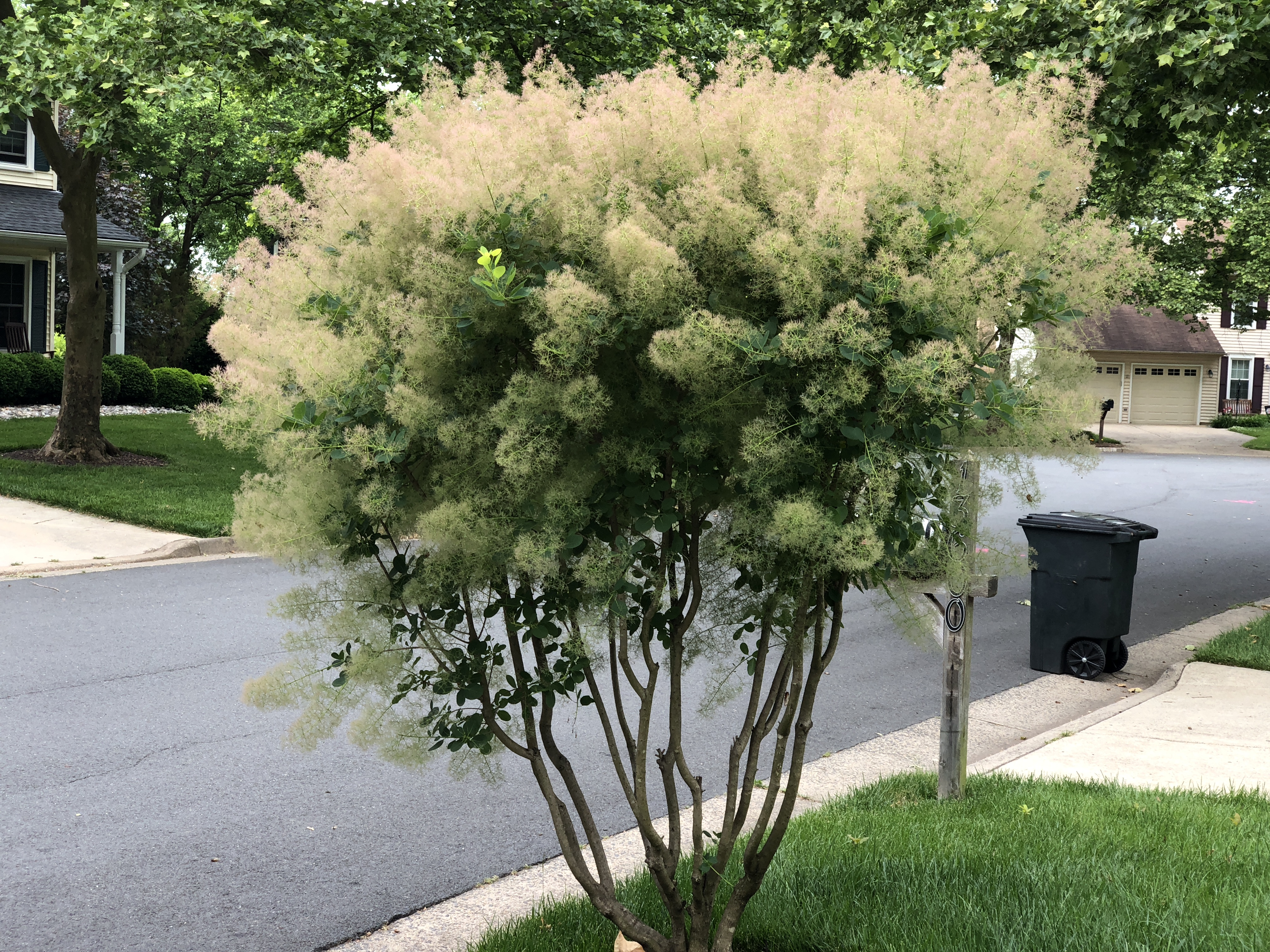
American smoketree

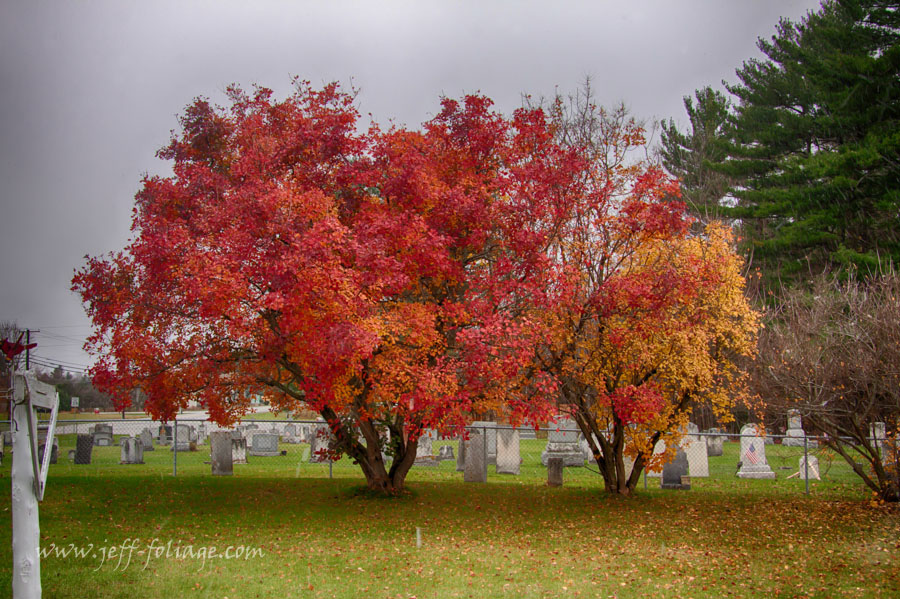
American smoketree in Autumn

Back-lit Autumn canopy of Champion Tree specimen, Kew Gardens
