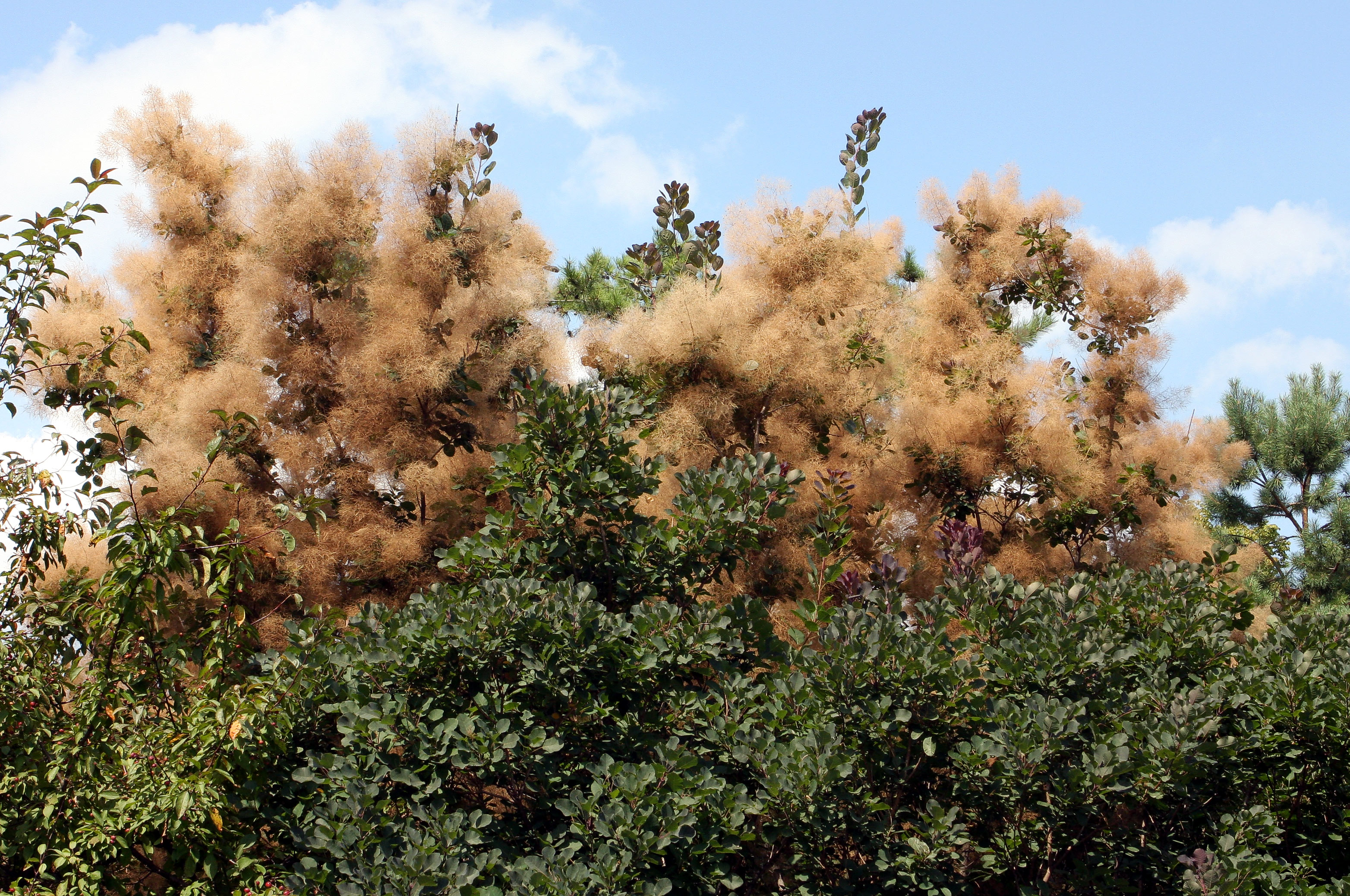
- Smoketree with "Smokey" look.

Scientific classification
- Kingdom: Plantae
- Clade: Tracheophytes
- Clade: Angiosperms
- Clade: Eudicots
- Clade: Rosids
- Order: Sapindales
- Family: Anacardiaceae
- Subfamily: Anacardioideae
- Genus: Cotinus; Mill.

Species
- Cotinus carranzae Rzed. & Calderón; Cotinus chiangii (D.A.Young) Rzed. & Calderón; Cotinus coggygria Scop.; Cotinus kanaka (R.N.De) D.Chandra; Cotinus nanus W.W.Sm.; Cotinus obovatus Raf.; Cotinus szechuanensis Pénzes

= Cotinus =

Smoke tree

Genus of flowering plants

Cotinus (/koʊˈtaɪnəs/), the smoketree or smoke bush, is a genus of seven species of flowering plants in the family Anacardiaceae, closely related to the sumacs (Rhus).

== Characteristics ==
They are large shrubs or small trees, native to the warm temperate Northern Hemisphere. The leaves are deciduous, alternate, simple oval shape, 3–13 cm long. The flowers are clustered in a large open terminal panicles 15–30 cm long with a fluffy grayish-buff appearance resembling a cloud of smoke over the plant, from which the name derives. The fruit is a small drupe with a single seed. Often classified in Rhus in the past, they are distinguished by the leaves being simple (not pinnate) and the 'smoke-like' fluffy flower heads.

== Growth ==
The American smoketree (Cotinus obovatus, syn. Rhus cotinoides) is native to the southeastern United States, from Tennessee south to Alabama and west to Oklahoma and eastern Texas. It is a larger plant, frequently becoming a small tree between 3 and 5 meters (9.8 and 16.4 feet) tall, with a trunk from 20 to 35 centimeters (7.9 to 13.8 inches) in diameter. The leaves are also larger, 6–13 cm long; it also has varied but very bright fall color, usually brighter than the Eurasian species. The foliage is described to be a red wine-like, and the shrub has deep pink flowers in the summer. The flower heads are usually sparser than in C. coggygria.

== Cultivation and uses ==
The smoke trees, particularly C. coggygria, are popular garden shrubs. Several bronze or purple-leaved cultivars of C. coggygria have been selected, with warm pink inflorescences set against purple-black foliage; the most common in commerce are 'Notcutt's Variety' and 'Royal Purple'. When brought into cultivation together, the two species will form hybrids; some garden cultivars are of this parentage.

Cultivation is best in dry, infertile soils, which keeps the growth habit more compact and also improves the autumn colour; when planted in fertile soil, they become large, coarse and also tend to be short-lived, succumbing to verticillium wilt disease. They can be coppiced in early spring, to produce first-year shoots up to 2 m tall with large handsome leaves, but no "smoke".

== Gallery ==
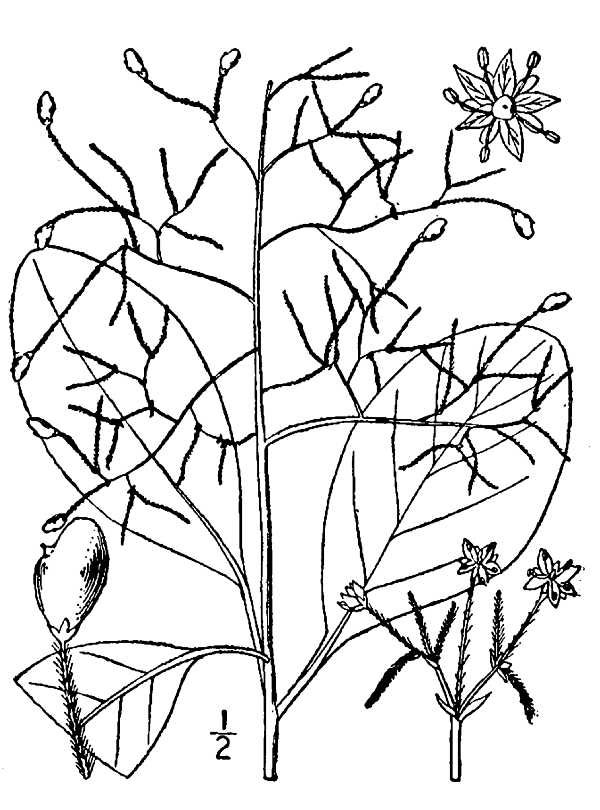
American smoketree (Cotinus obovatus)

Smoketree (Cotinus coggygria)

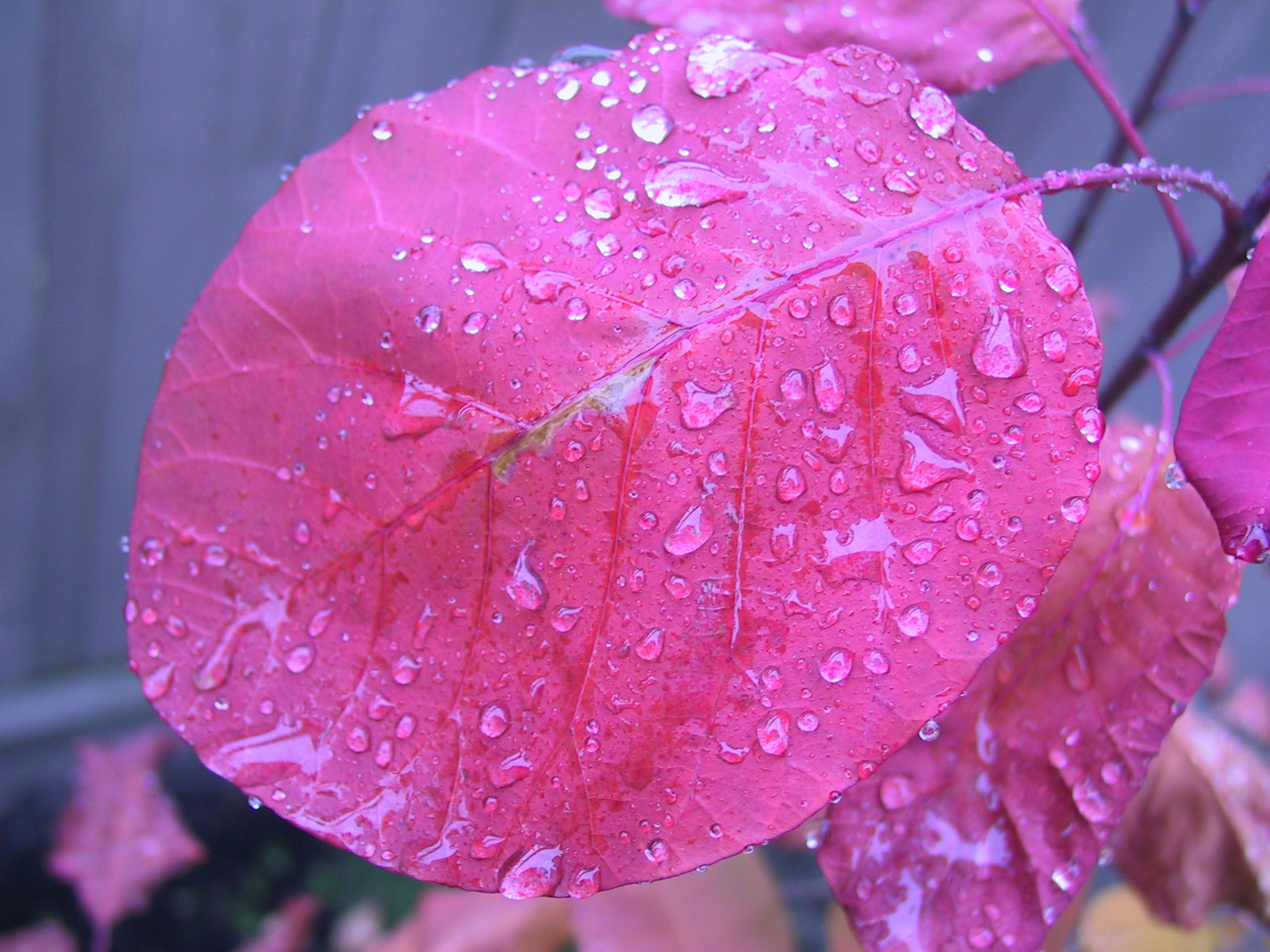
Smoketree leaf

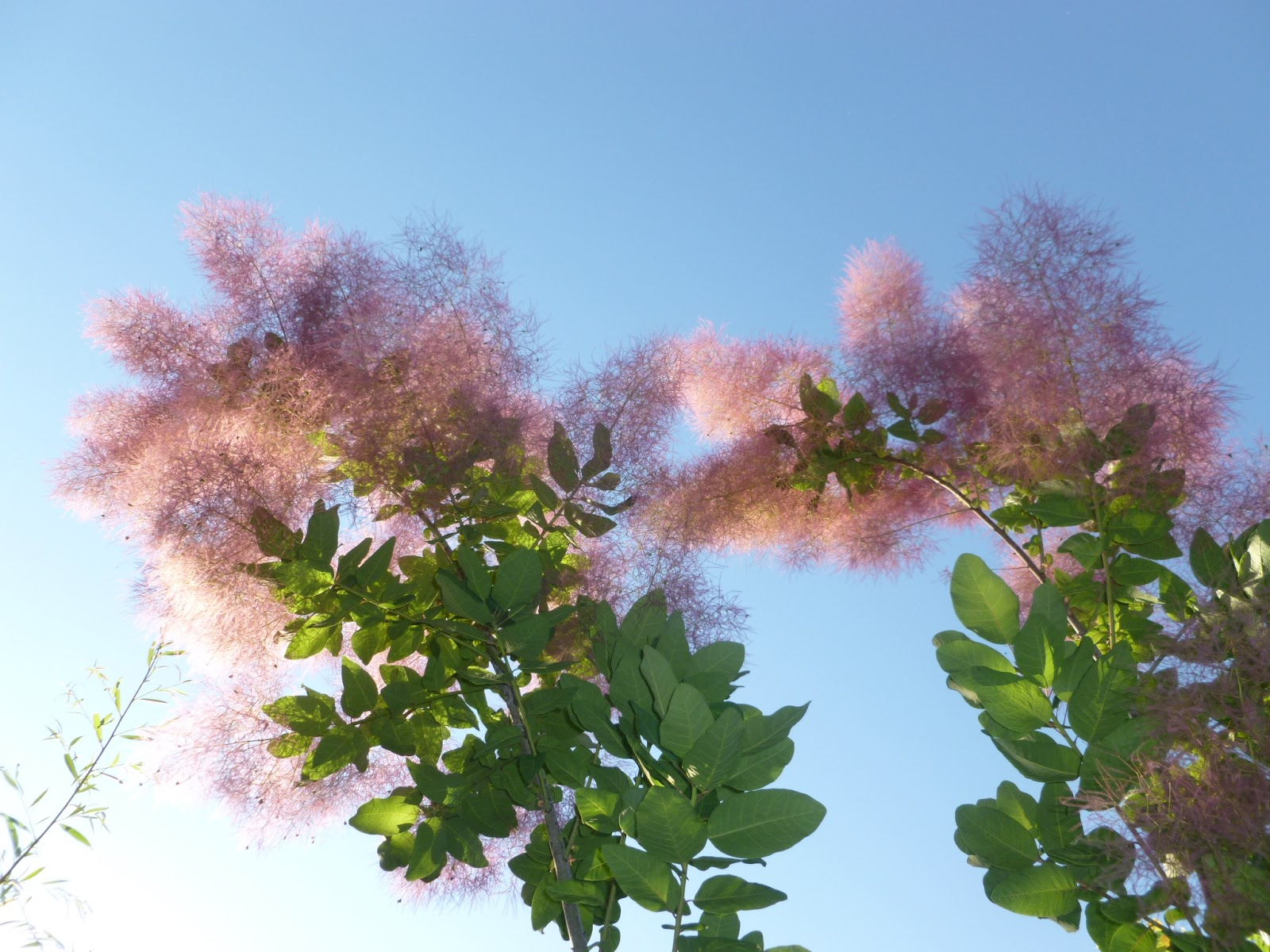
Young smoketree in bloom

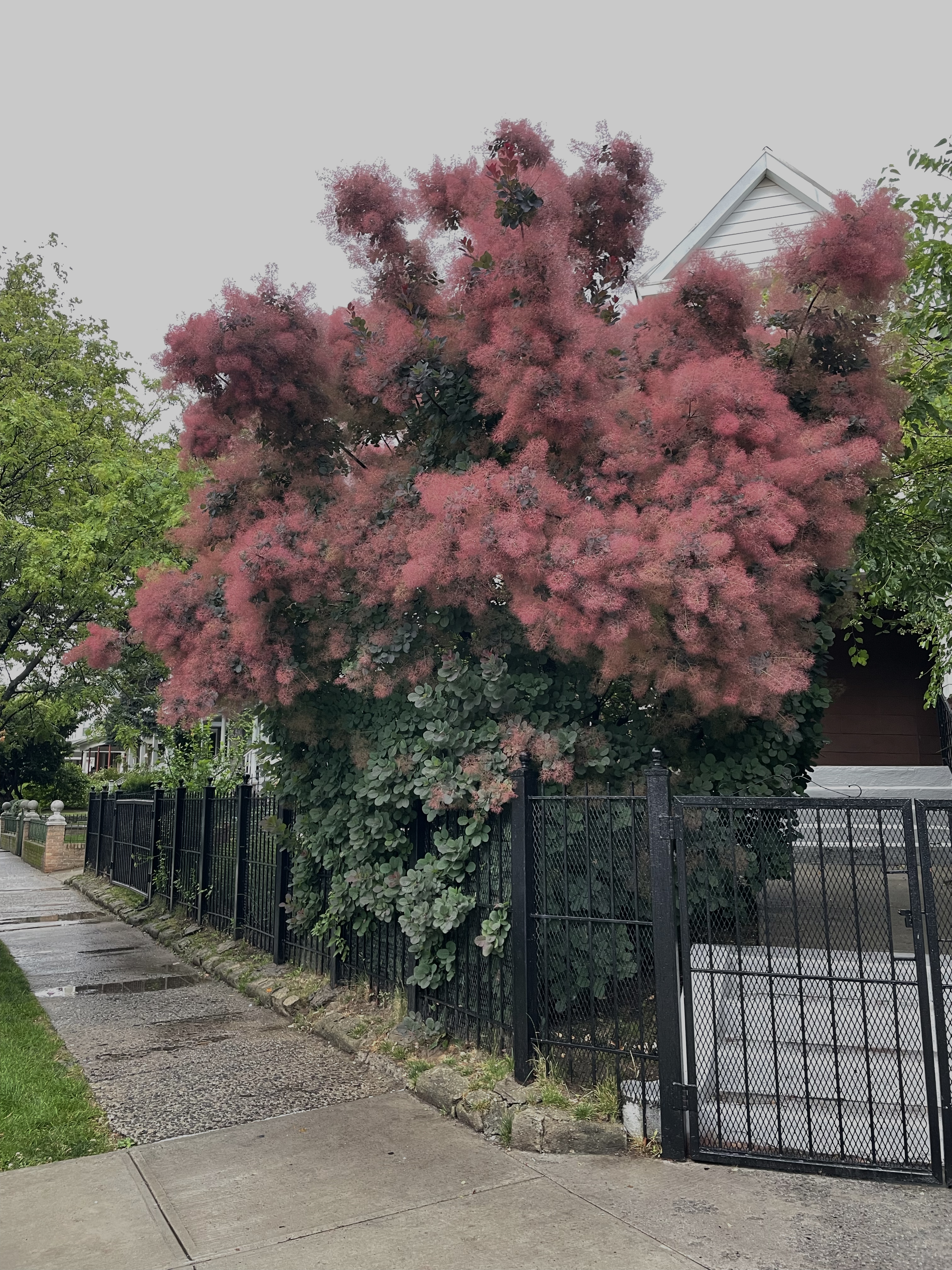
