= Wislicenus =

Wislicenus is a surname. Notable people with the surname include:

- Gustav Adolf Wislicenus (1803–1875), German theologian
- Hermann Wislicenus (1825–1899), German historical painter
- Johannes Wislicenus (1835–1902), German chemist
- Walter Wislicenus (1859–1905), German astronomer

== See also ==
- 4588 Wislicenus, a main-belt asteroid
- Wislicenus (crater), an impact crater in the Sinus Sabaeus quadrangle of Mars
