= Christian Catholic Church =

The term Christian Catholic Church can refer to:

- the Christian Catholic Apostolic Church founded in 1896 by John Alexander Dowie, also called Zionites
- the Christian Catholic Church of Switzerland
- a movement founded in October 1844 by German priest Johannes Czerski and discussed in the article on German Catholics (sect)
