= Karl Theodor Bayrhoffer =

German-American philosopher (1812–1888)

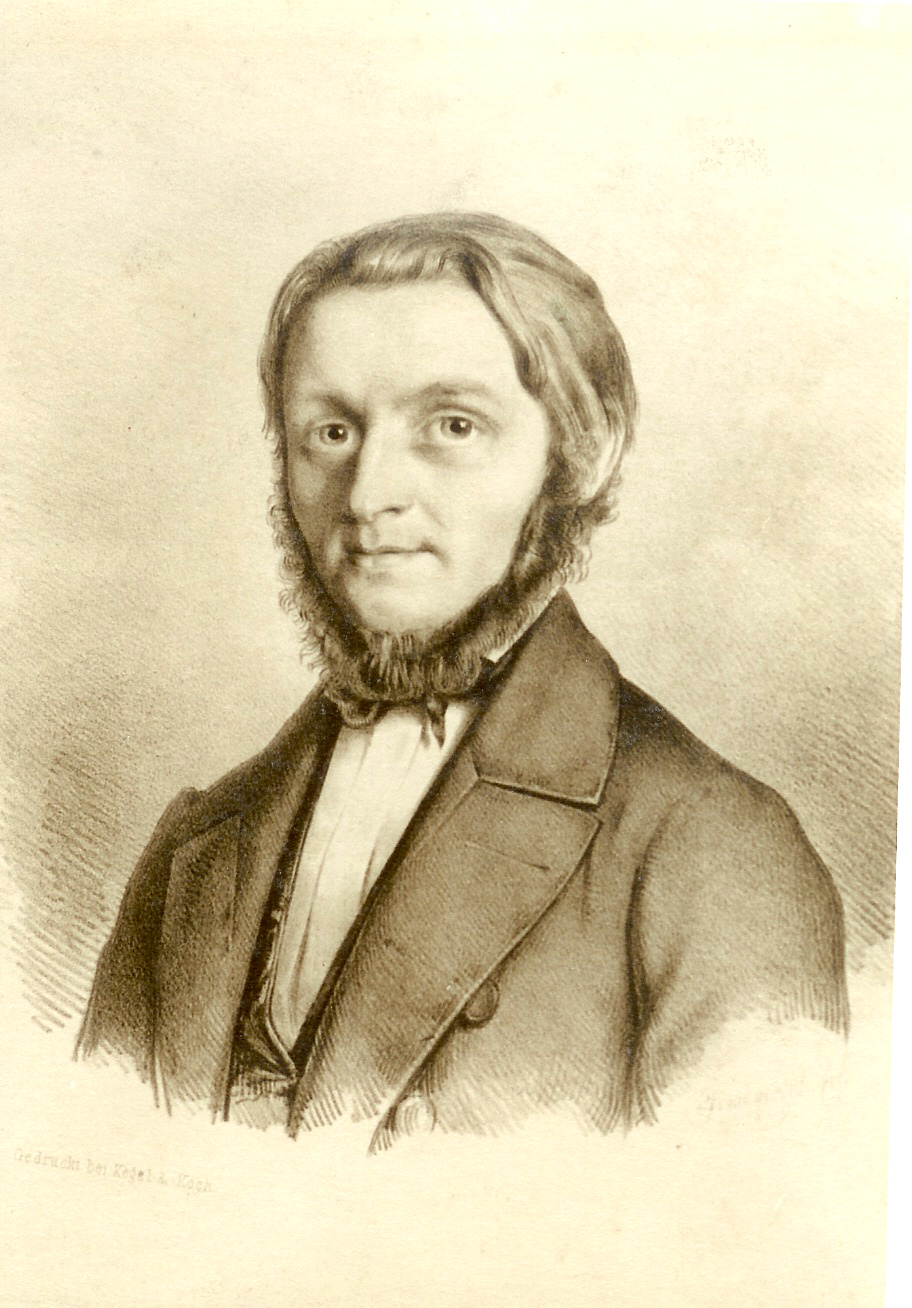
- Born: Karl Theodor Otto Christian August Bayrhoffer; 14 October 1812; Marburg, Kingdom of Westphalia
- Died: 3 February 1888 (aged 75); Monroe, Wisconsin, U.S.

Education
- Education: University of Marburg (PhD, 1834)

Philosophical work
- Era: 19th-century philosophy
- Region: Western philosophy
- School: Hegelianism
- Institutions: University of Marburg (1838–1851)
- Main interests: Metaphysics; Epistemology; Naturphilosophie; Philosophy of history; Political philosophy; German Catholicism

Karl Theodor Otto Christian August Bayrhoffer (German: [ˈbaɪɐˌhɔfɐ]; 14 October 1812 – 3 February 1888) was a German American philosopher, free-thinker, and publicist.

In 1834 he received his PhD from the University of Marburg, where he later became a professor of philosophy. In 1847 he founded the free-thinking movement in Marburg. He became a member of the Diet of Hesse-Kassel (or Hesse-Cassel) in 1848 and in 1850 was President of the Chamber. After impeachment and the defeat of his party, he was imprisoned for a time before emigrating to the United States. and settling in Wisconsin as a farmer. When his sons became old enough to manage the farm, he returned to his writing.

In his early writings, notably in Die Idee und Geschichte der Philosophie ("Idea and History of Philosophy", 1838), he appears as a zealous disciple of Georg Wilhelm Friedrich Hegel. Afterward he became a champion of German Catholicism and wrote Researches into the Essence, History, and Criticism of Religion (1849).

== Early life ==
On 14 October 1812, in Marburg, Karl was born to Johann Peter Bayrhoffer, a university printer and bookseller, and Maria Luisa Jungst.

== Career ==
=== Professor of philosophy ===
Bayrhoffer received his doctorate (PhD) in Philosophy from the University of Marburg in 1834. In 1838 he requested a position as an associate professor of philosophy at the university and was given it initially without pay. By 1845 he was granted a full professorship. From 1846 through 1849 Bayrhoffer was suspended three times from the university for unlawful behavior related to his activities as a German Catholic dissident. A passionate free-thinker and religious activist, he then founded the free-religious movement as part of the Friends of Light (or "Lichtfreunde") in Marburg in 1847.

=== Politician and activist ===
In 1848, while suspended from his position at the university, he became a member of the Kurhessian Estates Assembly. Two years later he was made President of the Diet. Bayrhoffer organized a meeting in Frankfurt between all democratic parties in the state to unite their cause.

"While the Majority in June was creating an Imperial Regent, these men had held a great meeting of their own party in Frankfort, brought together by Professor Bayrhoffer of Marburg, a dapper little man with a sharp nose and a thin voice, who hitherto had never known anything of the world outside of Hegel's Logic, and who now became, quite as exclusively, a votary of the theories of Robespierre. He preached the union of all champions of the People unweariedly for the realization of the supremacy of the People and for the destruction of the People's enemies. It was decided to unite the countless Democratic societies into one large, well-organized Association under one common direction, to keep the people in as continual a state of restlessness as possible, and in all conceivable ways to prepare for one last great blow. It was expected that in a few weeks their success would be decisive and satisfactory."

While Bayrhoffer was president, the assembly and its liberal democratic constitution, regarded the most advanced of its time, faced considerable opposition in what is now known as the Autumn Crisis of 1850 when the estates assembly refused to allow the head of Hesse-Kassel government, Daniel Hassenpflug, to levy taxes without a constitutionally required budget proposal from the state. The result of which was a counter-revolutionary response via suspension of the constitution by Elector Friedrich Wilhelm I, the dissolution of the Diet, and an unsuccessful declaration of martial law. Upon declaration, 241 of 277 Kurhessian officers submitted dismissal applications because of their oath not only to the electorate but also to the constitution which the assembly upheld. This led to federal intervention on 1 November 1850, by the Federal Assembly in which 25,000 Bavarian and Austrian troops (called the "Strafbayern" or "the punitive Bavarians" by Kurhessen citizens) were sent to occupy Hesse to restore governmental order. The occupation continued until the summer of 1851.

In November 1851 Bayrhoffer requested five days of vacation from his office and never returned. This prompted the criminal court of Marburg to begin an investigation on the suspicion of high treason. In 1852 the Court of Kassel sentenced Bayrhoffer's impeachment without pay due to "unauthorized absence from legal domicile," and on 22 August 1853, the jury of Marburg sentenced Bayrhoffer to fifteen years imprisonment and loss of the national cockade for treason.

=== Wisconsin farmer ===
After fleeing to Switzerland, Bayrhoffer reunited with his wife, Julia, and children in Cherbourg, France. They sailed to the United States by way of England and settled in Jordan, Wisconsin, where he purchased a farm. There he worked as a farmer until his elder sons were able to take over management. After that he resumed writing. In 1867 he applied for a position within the library at his alma mater the University of Marburg but was unsuccessful. In 1868 he also applied for professorship positions at other Prussian universities but the effort was fruitless.

== Personal life ==
On 30 July 1840, Karl Bayrhoffer married Julia Christine Caroline Creuzer, the daughter of distinguished Marburg University professor, theologian, and philosopher Christoph Andreas Leonard Creuzer and his wife Charlotta Lindenmeyer.

Karl and Julia Creuzer had six children between 1841 and 1852 in Germany before emigrating to the United States. After Julia's death in 1853, Karl married Charlotte Draz in 1854. Karl and Charlotte had four children, including daughter Fanny J. Bayrhoffer Thelan.

Bayrhoffer died in Monroe, Wisconsin, on 3 February 1888, at the age of 75.

== Works ==
- The Fundamental Problems of Metaphysics, Presented as an Attempt at Solving Them and Presented with Fragile Theoretical-Metaphysical Fragments (1835)
- The concept of the organic healing of man in relation to the healing methods of the present. In addition to the preview of the current crisis in world history (1837)
- The Idea and History of Philosophy (1838)
- Contributions to the Natural Philosophy (1839)
- The Nature of the Universe and the Laws of Humanism, Illustrated from the Viewpoint of Reason (1871)
