= Wilhelm Heinrich Heintz =

German chemist (1817–1880)

- Born: 4 November 1817; Berlin
- Died: 1 December 1880 (aged 63); Halle an der Saale
- Known for: Margaric acid heptadecanoic acid Deutsche Physikalische Gesellschaft
- Scientific career
- Fields: Chemist and Physicist
- Workplaces: Berlin University; University of Halle
- Doctoral advisor: Heinrich Rose
- Doctoral students: Johannes Wislicenus

Wilhelm Heinrich Heintz (4 November 1817 – 1 December 1880) was a German structural chemist from Berlin.

He initially trained and worked as a pharmacist, from 1841 he studied sciences at the University of Berlin. He earned his PhD at Berlin in 1844 under Heinrich Rose, and two years later, obtained his habilitation in chemistry. In 1850 he became an associate professor at the University of Halle, where in 1855 he attained a full professorship. He was one of six founding members of the Deutsche Physikalische Gesellschaft and the only chemist.

At Halle, Heintz supervised Johannes Wislicenus's Ph.D. work, although Wislicenus' pro forma advisor at Zurich was Georg Karl Andreas Städeler. With Christoph Gottfried Giebel, he was editor of the Zeitschrift für Naturwissenschaften.

In 1853 he analyzed margaric acid as simply a combination of stearic acid and palmitic acid. He also conducted analysis of uric acid in urea, created methods for the analysis of nitrogen in organic compounds, and studied chemical reactions of chloroacetic acid and the reaction of acetone with amines. In addition he performed chemical investigations of uranium, bismuth, caesium, rubidium and metal phosphates.

The mineral heintzite is named for him.

== Published works ==
- Ueber den färbenden Bestandtheil des Feuersteins, Carneols und Amethystes. In: Annalen der Physik und Chemie. Band 136, Johann Ambrosius Barth, Leipzig 1843, S. 519–527 – the coloring constituent of flints, carnelians and amethysts.
- Untersuchung einiger Verbindungen des Wismuths, besonders in Rücksicht der Zusammensetzung des Wismuthoxyds. In: Annalen der Physik und Chemie. Band 139, Johann Ambrosius Barth, Leipzig 1844, S. 55–95 – Investigation of some compounds of bismuth, especially in consideration of the composition of bismuth oxides.
- De acido saccharico ejusqe saiibus. (dissertation), Berlin 1844.
- Lehrbuch der Zoochemie. Georg Reimer, Berlin 1853 – Textbook of zoochemistry.
- Drei neue absolut isomere Körper, das Aethylglycolamid, Aethyglycocoll und Aethoxacetamid. In: Zeitschrift für die Gesammten Naturwissenschaften. 23. Band, Wiegandt & Hempel, Berlin 1864, S. 89–107 – Three new absolute isomer bodies; ethyl glycolamide, ethyl glycocoll and ethoxyacetamide.
