= Thelen =

Thelen may refer to:

== People ==
- A. J. Thelen (born 1986), retired American professional ice hockey defenseman
- Albert Vigoleis Thelen (1903-1989), German author and translator
- Dave Thelen (born 1936), former Canadian Football League running back
- Eduard Thelen (born 1943), former German field hockey player
- Esther Thelen (1941-2004), American developmental psychologist
- Fanny Thelen (1856 - 1939), American clubwoman
- Frank Thelen (born 1975), German businessman
- Jodi Thelen (born 1962), American actress
- Kathleen Thelen, American professor
- Michael Thelen (1834–1918), German-American politician
- Nathan Thelen, one of the founding members of the band Pretty Girls Make Graves
- Paul Thelen, chairman and chief executive officer of Big Fish Games
- Robert Thelen (1884-1968), German aviation pioneer and designer
- Robert Thelen III, one of the founders of The Mendota Beacon
- Tim Thelen (born 1961), American professional golfer

== Other uses ==
- Thelen LLP, a former American law firm
- Thelen Madagascar Frog, a common name for the frog Gephyromantis thelenae
