= Czerski =

Czerski (feminine: Czerska; plural: Czerscy) is a Polish surname. Notable people with the surname include:

- Helen Czerski (born 1978), British physicist and oceanographer
- Jan Czerski (1845–1892), Polish paleontologist
- Johannes Czerski (1813–1893), German Roman Catholic priest
- Stanisław Czerski (1777–1833), Polish Jesuit priest
