= Biskupów =

- Village
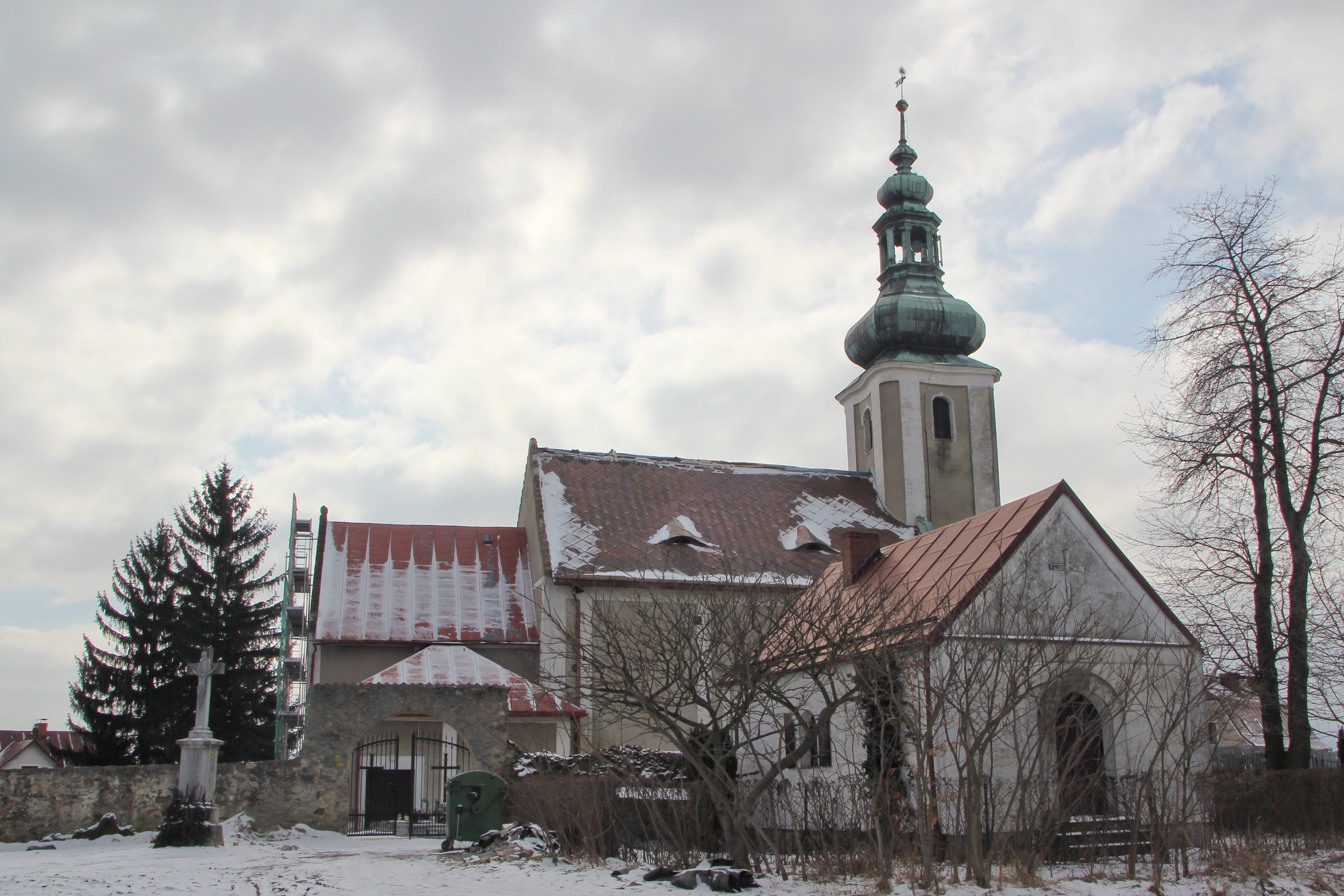
- Church of the Annunciation of the Virgin Mary

- Location within Poland
- Coordinates: 50°23′N 17°18′E
- Country: Poland
- Voivodeship: Opole
- County: Nysa
- Gmina: Głuchołazy

Biskupów [bisˈkupuf] (German: Bischofswalde) is a village in the administrative district of Gmina Głuchołazy, within Nysa County, Opole Voivodeship, in south-western Poland, close to the Czech border.

== Notable residents ==
- Johannes Ronge (1813–1887), founder of the German Catholics
- Bernard Sannig
