= Henrica Iliohan =

Dutch-born American woman suffragist and translator

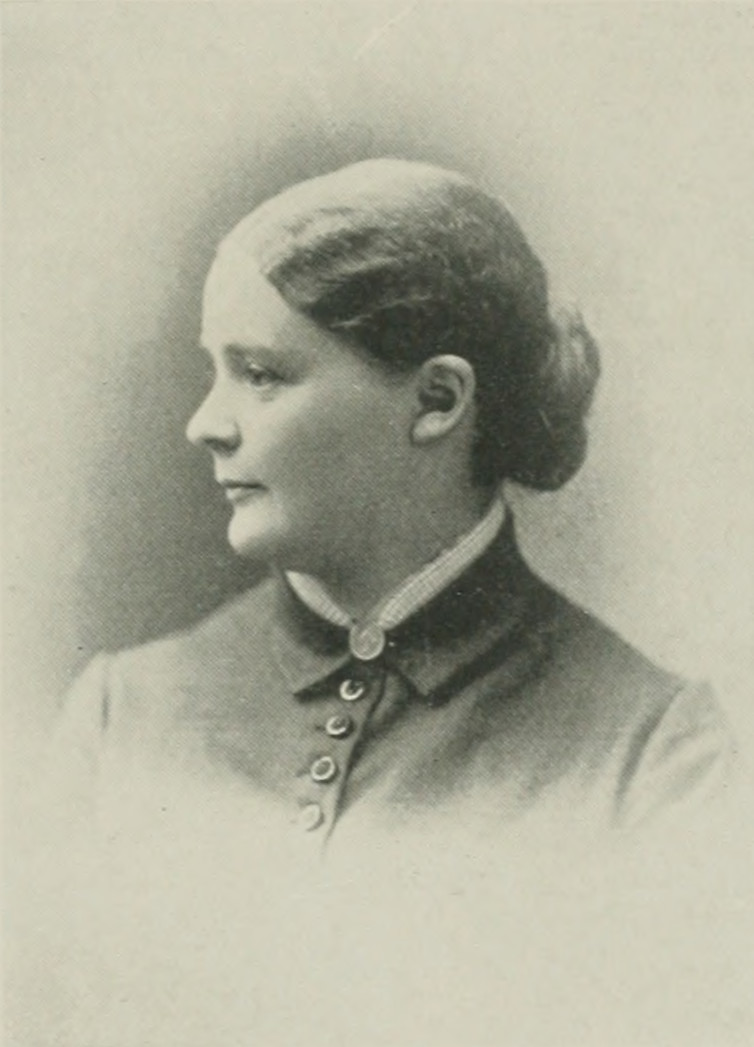
- Henrica Iliohan, a "Woman of the Century"
- Born: Henrica Weenink; May 3, 1850; Gelderland, Netherlands
- Died: July 1, 1921 (aged 71); Oakland, California
- Occupation: Suffragist

Henrica Iliohan (3 May 1850 – 1 July 1921) was a Dutch-born American woman suffragist and translator.

== Early years ==
Henrica Weenink was born in Vorden, Province of Gelderland, Kingdom of the Netherlands, 3 May 1850. Her father was a successful architect and builder. When but a child, she became cognizant of the different education offered to boys and girls. She showed an aptitude for the carpenter's trade, being fascinated by her father's workshop. When she was eight years of age, she could plane a board as well as an older brother. The workmen would often send her home crying by saying she was a girl and therefore could never be a carpenter. She remembers that this happened when she was so young that to her consciousness the only difference lay in dress, and she would earnestly beg her mother to dress her in her brother's clothes, so that she might become a carpenter. The disability of sex became of more and more importance as she thought and studied upon it. She was eighteen years of age when her mother died.

== Career ==
In May 1870, her father sailed with his three children for the United States, arriving in Albany, New York. She was fortunate in being the object of one woman's considerate kindness and patience, in her efforts to learn the English language. In trying to read English, she noticed for the first time an article on woman suffrage in the Albany Journal, in 1871, when Lillie Devereaux Blake addressed the assembly and asked the question: "Whom do you think, gentleman of the committee, to be most competent to cast a ballot, the mother who comes from the fireside, or the husband that comes from the corner saloon?" This was to the young discoverer a javelin that struck home, and she made inquiries why women did not and could not vote. Very much interested, she read all that was accessible on the subject, and when, in 1877, the first Woman Suffrage Society of Albany was organized, she became an earnest member. With the remembrance of woman's share in the brave deeds recorded in Dutch history, she gained in courage and enthusiasm and began to express herself publicly. Her first appearance on the lecture platform was a triumph. Encouraged by many, she gained in experience and became one of the acknowledged leaders of the society. She was elected four times a delegate from the society to the annual convention in New York City, and worked during the sessions of the legislature to obtain the consideration of that body.

Iliohan was also a translator, including The Religion of Common Sense, from the German of Prof. Leberecht Uhlich.

In 1887, she removed, with her family, to Humphrey, Nebraska. Afterwards, she was identified with Nebraska and with subjects of reform in that State. She died 1 July 1921 in Oakland, California and was buried at the Albany Rural Cemetery in Menands, New York.
