= Oskar Wettstein =

Swiss politician (1866–1952)

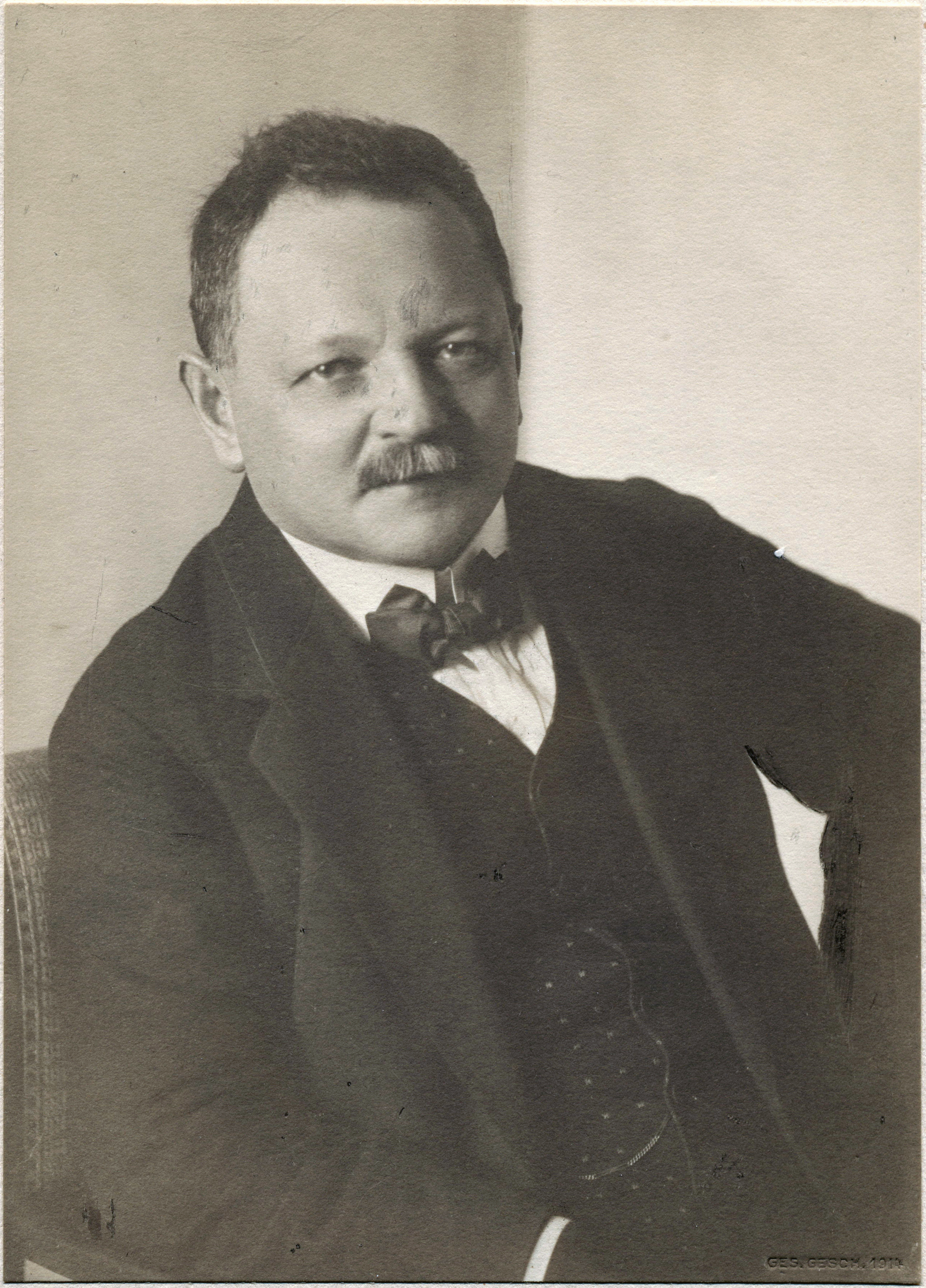
- Photograph by Franz Schmelhaus, around 1914
- Born: 26 March 1866; Zurich, Switzerland
- Died: 16 February 1952 (aged 85); Zurich, Switzerland
- Occupations: Journalist; politician
- Spouses: Hedwig Maria Mina Adelt (m. 1889) Agnes Erika Abeljanz (m. 1898)
- Parents: Markus Wettstein (father); Anna Barbara Schuler (mother)
- Relatives: Haruthiun Abeljanz (father-in-law)

Oskar Wettstein (26 March 1866 – 16 February 1952) was a Swiss journalist and politician from Zurich. He was editor-in-chief of the Züricher Post from 1895 to 1914, a member of the government of the canton of Zurich from 1914 to 1935 and a member of the Council of States from 1914 to 1939. In 1929 he stood unsuccessfully for the Federal Council.

== Biography ==
Oskar Wettstein was born on 26 March 1866 in Zurich, the son of Markus Wettstein, director of the Hypothekarbank Winterthur and a member of the city council (Stadtrat) of Zurich, and Anna Barbara née Schuler. In 1889 he married Hedwig Maria Mina Adelt, daughter of Ferdinand Adelt. In 1898 he married Agnes Erika Abeljanz, daughter of Haruthiun Abeljanz, the cantonal chemist of Zurich and full professor of organic chemistry at the University of Zurich.

Wettstein attended the Gymnasium in Winterthur and studied law in Zurich, Montpellier, Strasbourg, Leipzig and Erlangen, where he obtained his doctorate in 1889. From 1890 to 1895 he worked as a journalist in Berlin, and from 1895 to 1914 he was editor-in-chief of the Züricher Post. From 1903 to 1938 he was a Privatdozent (lecturer) in journalism and press law at the University of Zurich, and he was a co-founder of its journalism seminar.

From 1897 to 1914 Wettstein sat as a Democrat in Zurich's city parliament (Grosser Stadtrat), and from 1902 to 1914 he was a member of the Cantonal Council of Zurich (Kantonsrat). From 1914 to 1935 he was a member of the cantonal government (Regierungsrat), heading the justice and police department from 1914, the department of the interior and justice from 1920 and the education department from 1928. From 1914 to 1939 he sat in the Council of States. Wettstein, who was considered an excellent speaker and stood out as an active political writer (Publizist), was the candidate of the radical-democratic parliamentary group for the Federal Council in 1929, but was not elected. He held numerous seats on boards of directors. He died in Zurich on 16 February 1952.

== Bibliography ==
- E. Gruner, Die Schweizerische Bundesversammlung 1848–1920, 1, 1966, 124–125
- S. G. Schmid, Die Zürcher Kantonsregierung seit 1803, 2003, 363–364
