= Haruthiun Abeljanz =

Swiss chemist and professor (1849–1921)

Haruthiun Tigran Abeljanz
- Haruthiun Abeljanz (1914)
- Born: April 25, 1849
- Died: October 11, 1921 (aged 72)
- Occupation: chemist

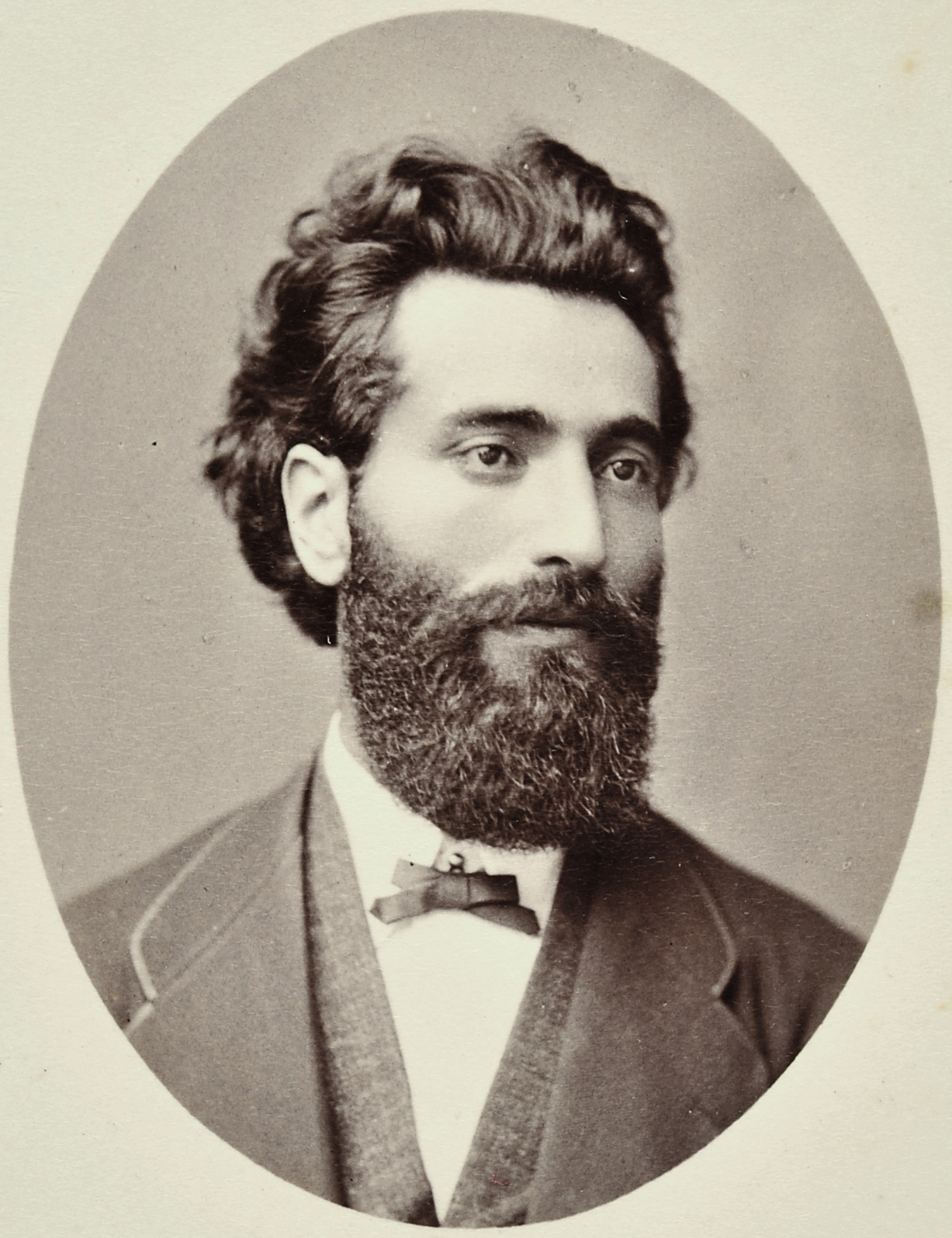
Haruthiun Abeljanz (ca. 1886)

Haruthiun Tigran Abeljanz (April 25, 1849 – October 11, 1921) was a Swiss-Armenian chemist.

== Biography ==
Abeljanz was born in the village of Vardablur, in what is now Armenia's Lori Province. He first studied in Heidelberg, then enrolled in the Philosophical Faculty II of the University of Zurich for chemistry in the summer semester of 1869. He passed his final examination on 27 November 1871 and was granted his PhD on 27 February 1872, with Johannes Wislicenus as his doctoral adviser, on the basis of his dissertation, Über den Bichloräther. In 1873 he completed his postdoctoral degree at the University of Zurich and subsequently read at the university and the Swiss Federal Institute of Technology in Zürich at the same time.

On 15 February 1877, he took up the newly created office of cantonal chemist, responsible for the analysis of food and drinking water quality. He resigned from this office on 20 April 1884 after he was appointed associate professor of organic chemistry. He was naturalized in Zurich on 26 July 1884.

He married Dr. Virginia Schlikoff (born Jenja Schlikova on 15 July 1853 in Moscow, died 26 September 1949 in Zurich) on 25 October 1876, and their daughter Agnes Erika was born in 1878. They divorced on 5 July 1902.

Abeljanz was appointed full professor of organic chemistry at the University of Zurich in 1890 and held this position until his retirement in 1920.

His most successful publication was A system of qualitative chemical analysis begun by Georg Städeler and continued by Hermann Kolbe, which he oversaw in numerous editions from the 9th edition (1891) and was translated into several languages.

== Works ==
- Über den Bichloräther. Zürich: Zürcher & Furrer 1872
- Über Benzolkalium, in: Vierteljahrsschrift der Naturforschenden Gesellschaft in Zürich 20 (1875), S. 458–463
- (authored with Georg Andreas Karl Städeler and Hermann Kolbe) Leitfaden für die qualitative chemische Analyse. Zürich: Orell Füssli, 9. Aufl. 1891, 15. Aufl. 1921
