= Wislicenus (crater) =

Crater on Mars

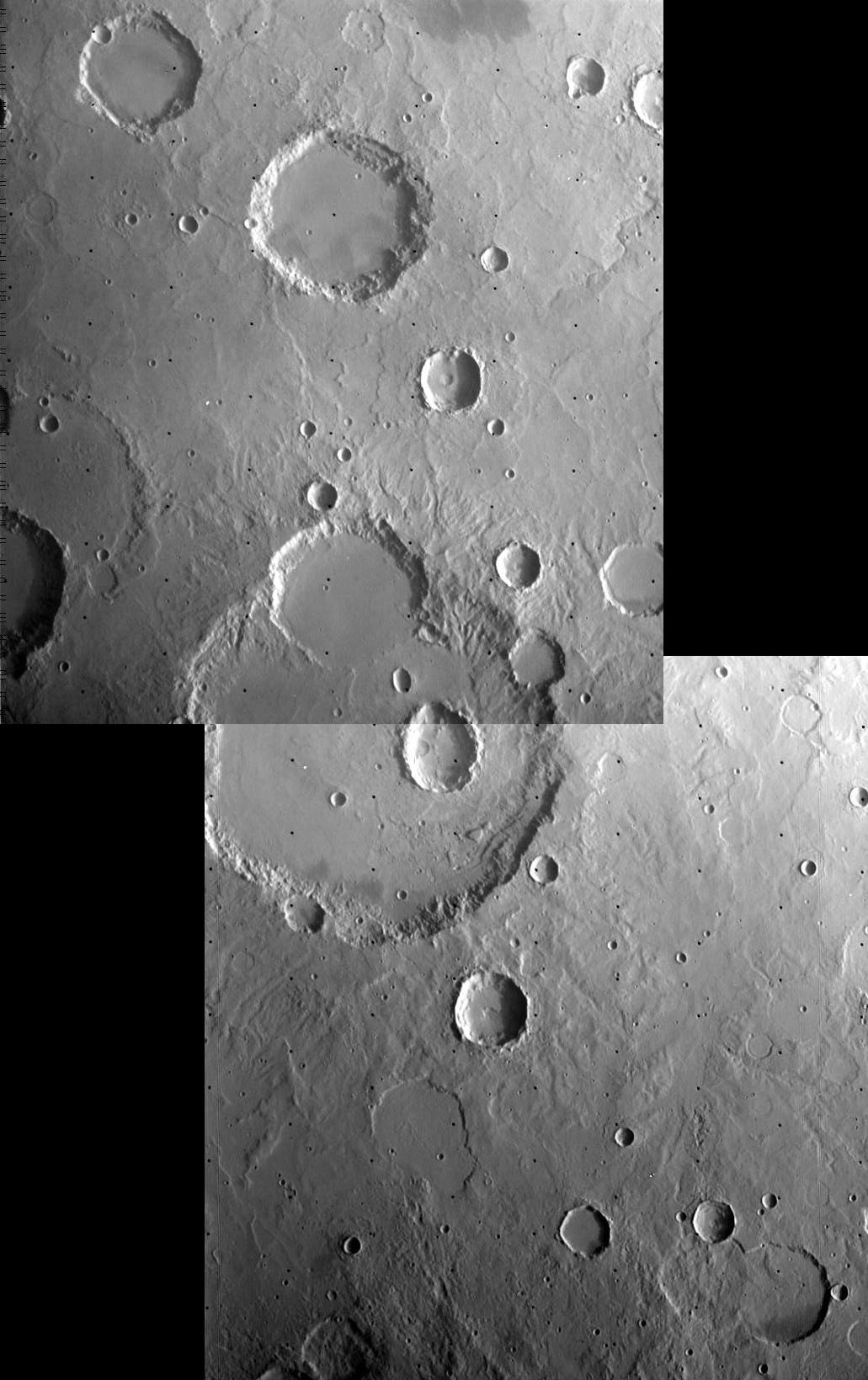
- Viking Orbiter 1 mosaic with Wislicenus at center
- Planet: Mars
- Coordinates: 18.4°S 348.6°W
- Quadrangle: Sinus Sabaeus
- Diameter: 140.15 km (87.09 mi)
- Eponym: Walter Wislicenus, German astronomer (1859–1905)

Wislicenus is an impact crater on Mars, located in the Sinus Sabaeus quadrangle at 18.4° south latitude and 348.6° west longitude. It measures approximately 140.15 km (87.09 mi) in diameter and was named after German astronomer Walter Wislicenus (1859–1905). The name was adopted by the IAU in 1973.

== Layers ==
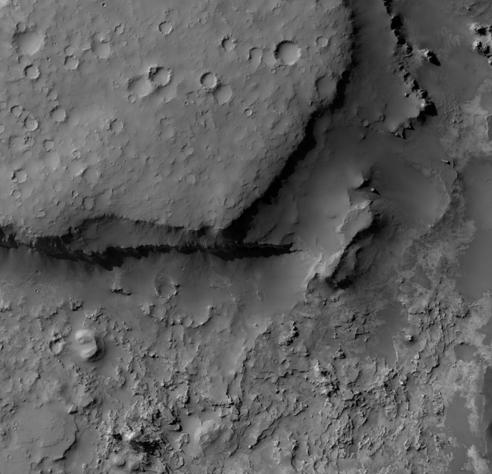
Visible layers on floor of Wislicenus due to erosion (HiRISE)

Wislicenus crater contains layers, also called strata. Many places on Mars show rocks arranged in layers. Sometimes the layers are of different colors. Light-toned rocks on Mars have been associated with hydrated minerals like sulfates. The Mars rover Opportunity examined such layers close-up with several instruments. Some layers are probably made up of fine particles because they seem to break up into find dust. Other layers break up into large boulders so they are probably much harder. Basalt, a volcanic rock, is thought to in the layers that form boulders. Basalt has been identified on Mars in many places. Instruments on orbiting spacecraft have detected clay (also called phyllosilicates) in some layers. Scientists are excited about finding hydrated minerals such as sulfates and clays on Mars because they are usually formed in the presence of water. Areas that contain clays and/or other hydrated minerals would be good places to look for evidence of life.

Rock can form layers in a variety of ways. Volcanoes, wind, or water can produce layers. However, the presence of hydrated minerals in Wislicenus crater is strong evidence for the involvement of water, perhaps in a lake. Many craters once contained lakes.

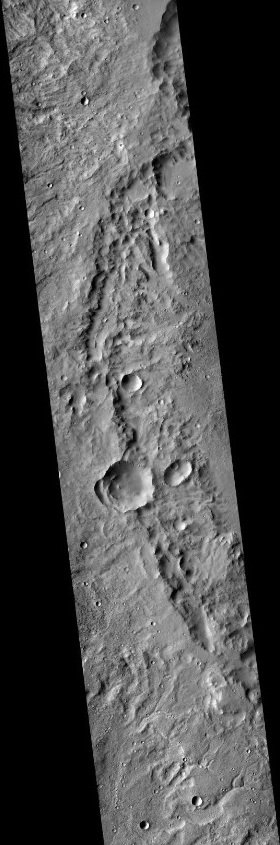
Western side of Wislicenus as seen by CTX camera on MRO

== See also ==
- Climate of Mars
- HiRISE
- Hydrothermal circulation
- Impact event
- Lakes on Mars
- List of craters on Mars
- Ore genesis
- Ore resources on Mars
- Planetary nomenclature
- Water on Mars
