= Johannes Ronge =

Prussian religious leader

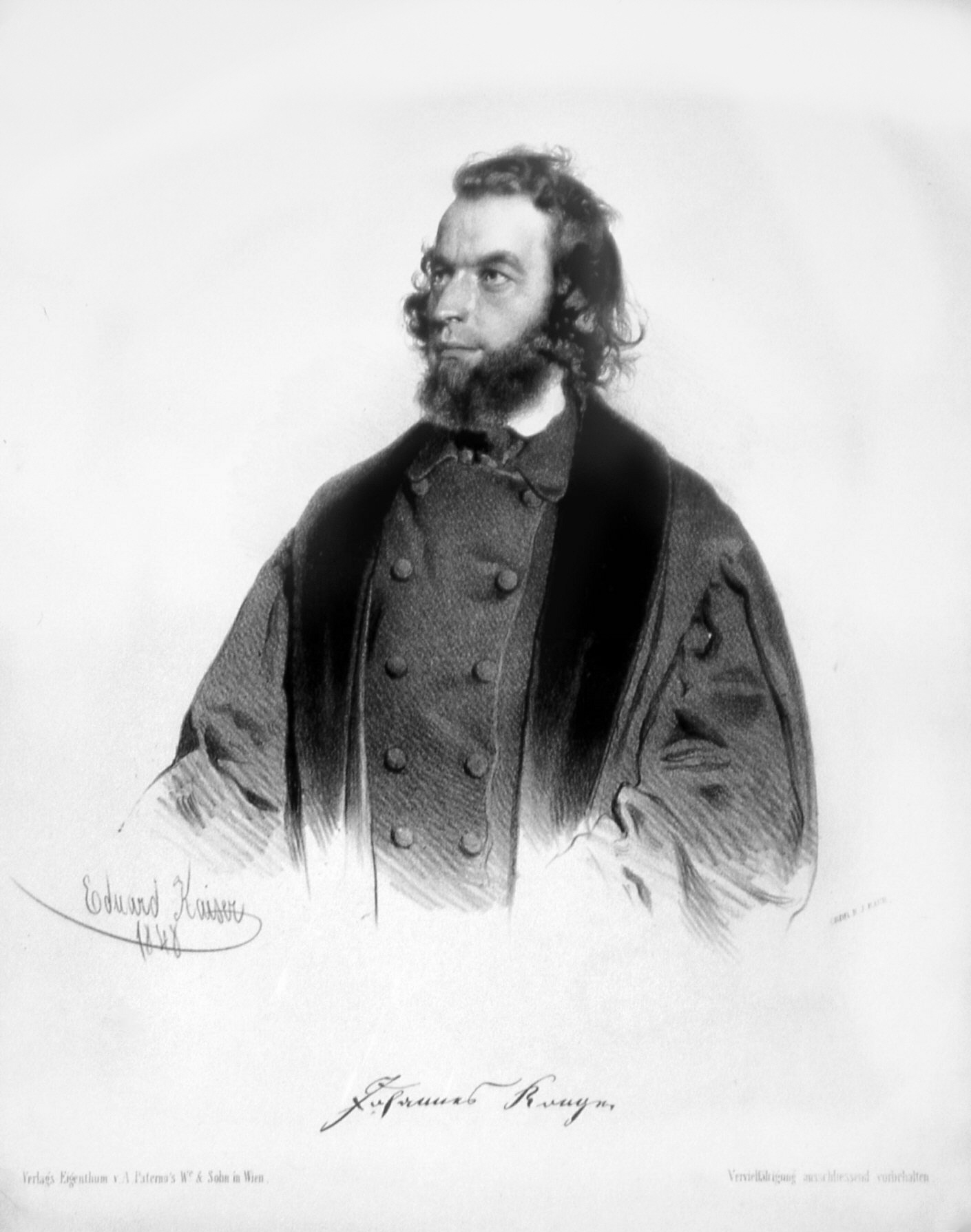
- Lithograph by Eduard Kaiser, 1848
- Born: 13 October 1813; Bischofswalde, Kingdom of Prussia
- Died: 27 October 1887 (aged 74); Vienna, Austria-Hungary
- Resting place: Breslau

Johannes Ronge (16 October 1813 – 26 October 1887) was the principal founder of the New Catholics. A Roman Catholic priest from the region of Upper Silesia in Prussia, he was suspended from the priesthood for his criticisms of the church, and went on to help found and promote the New Catholic movement. When the movement split, he led the more liberal wing, which became known as the German Catholics. Following his involvement in the political struggles of 1848 he went into exile in England, where he and his wife Bertha Ronge established a kindergarten in Manchester and then Leeds. He returned to Prussia in 1861 following an amnesty, and made efforts to revive the German Catholic movement and to combat antisemitism.

== Biography ==
Johannes Ronge was born in 1813 in Bischofswalde (now Biskupów) in Upper Silesia, then part of the Kingdom of Prussia (now in Poland). Ronge was educated at Breslau (1837–1839), entered the Roman Catholic priesthood (1840), and was settled at Grottkau (1841). His liberal tendencies brought him into frequent conflict with the Roman Catholic authorities. When he published criticisms of the relation between Rome and the Breslau Cathedral chapter in the Sächsischen Vaterlandsblättern, he was suspended in consequence (1843). He then went to Laurahütte in Upper Silesia as a teacher, and while there the exhibition of the Holy Coat at Treves, used by Bishop Arnoldi of Trier to increase pilgrimage and church revenue so stirred his ire that he denounced it in print (1 October 1844) in a public letter to Bishop Arnoldi. He published in succession a number of pamphlets in which he called on the Roman Catholic laity and the lower clergy to leave the communion of that Church. These were generally understood to be written from the standpoint of deism; and in subsequent years Ronge pronounced himself more and more unreservedly in favor of deistic doctrines.

== New Catholics ==
Ronge helped form the New Catholics, and served as Pastor for the first congregation in Breslau, which grew in less than a year to over 8,000 members. Ronge organized the New Catholics as a principally democratic organization. He ended the rule of celibacy for priests, excommunication, oral confessions, indulgences and other practices of the Catholic Church, and he married Bertha Meyer, sister of his friend Carl Schurz's wife, Margarethe. Ronge had also garnered support from Robert Blum, a newspaper publisher in Saxony, who published writings of the new movement.

Ronge's touring ministry brought about 100 new congregations to his movement. He decried declining spirituality and called for a separation from Rome, the formation of a German national church and an end to oral confession, priestly celibacy, Latin masses etc. During this time Johannes Czerski joined the movement. (In 1844, Czerski had resigned from his office in order to remove his congregation from the Roman Catholic Church.) A Leipzig council in 1845 brought the various congregations to a common agreement, and the number of congregations increased further to about 300. While free-thinking Protestants were sympathetic with the movement, the conservative Protestants did what they could to discourage it. Soon a split began within the movement between the more conservative Czerski and the more liberal Ronge, and an 1847 council in Berlin failed to mend it.

The New Catholics were later forced to change their name to German Catholics. A Protestant group analogous to the New Catholics, the Friends of the Light, joined with the German Catholics in 1849, forming the Freireligiöse ("free-thinkers") communities.

For his actions, Ronge was defrocked and excommunicated from the Roman Catholic Church.

== Political activities ==
Ronge took part in the political struggles of 1848 and was prominent as a democratic leader. He was obliged to flee to London, where he signed in 1851, with Arnold Ruge, Gustav Struve, Gottfried Kinkel, and others, a democratic manifesto to the German people, and where he became the leader of a free congregation. While in London, Ronge was subject to surveillance by The Police Union of German States because his wife's sister was married to Carl Schurz, whom they viewed as an emissary of communism.

Marx and Engels wrote "Heroes of the Exile" in 1852 in which they ridiculed Ronge and others who fled Germany following the failed revolution.

Ronge and his wife moved to Manchester, England, where they founded a kindergarten. In 1860 they relocated to Leeds, as other supporters of the kindergarten were disturbed by Ronge's religious views, and opened another kindergarten.

In consequence of the amnesty granted by the Prussian government, in 1861 he again made his appearance in Breslau. He founded a reform association in Frankfurt-am-Main in 1863, and endeavored to revive the waning German Catholicism. In 1873, he moved to Darmstadt, and there edited a paper in promotion of his plans. Ronge sought to interest liberal Jewish congregations in a common free religion, and in the 1870s and 1880s he agitated energetically against spreading antisemitism. He died in Vienna in 1887.

== Legacy ==
After the failed revolts, many Freireligiöse went to the United States (where they were known as "Freethinkers") or moved to Canada and South Africa where they acted as missionaries. In 1852, Wisconsin had 32 congregations. Their influence lasted into the early part of the 20th century, but then began to falter. The influence and lasting effect of this German movement remains in the Midwest.

== Works in English ==
- A German Catholic's Farewell to Rome (London, 1845)
- The Holy Coat of Treves, and the New German-Catholic Church (New York, 1845)
- The Autobiography and Justification of Johannes Ronge translated into English by John Lord (London, 1846)
- A Practical Guide to the English Kindergarten, with Bertha Ronge (London, 1855)
