= Bertha Ronge =

German education activist

Bertha Ronge (born Meyer; 25 April 1818 – 18 April 1863) was a German education activist. She was involved in the causes of childhood education, women's education and religious freedom. She established the kindergarten movement in England, where she founded the first three kindergartens in London (1851, with the assistance of her sister Margarethe Schurz), Manchester (1859) and Leeds (1860). She followed the precepts of Friedrich Fröbel, who advocated the use of structured play activities to promote learning. Bertha Ronge was largely responsible for Fröbel's kindergarten concept gaining a foothold in England.

== Biography ==
Bertha was born on 25 April 1818 in Hamburg. She was the second child of Heinrich Christian Meyer, a wealthy cane manufacturer, and his wife Agatha Margaretha (Beusch). Her mother died giving birth to her 11th child, Margarethe. Bertha married Christian Traun, 14 years her senior, in 1834. He was the private secretary of the Duchess of Cambridge. They had six children; one child died at the age of 11 years.

Bertha became an active founding member of the “Association of German Women”, the "Social Club of Hamburg Women for Equalizing Denominational Differences" (Socialen Verein Hamburger Frauen zur Ausgleichung konfessioneller Unterschiede; founded in 1848 to reduce religious discrimination against Jews), and the "Association of Women and Girls in Support of German Catholics" (Verein der Frauen und Jungfrauen zur Unterstützung der Deutschkatholiken; founded in 1846 to support the German Catholics specifically and to generally promote freedom of worship of independent congregations — freireligiösen Gemeinde — in a situation where marriages and baptisms outside religions recognized by the civil authorities were not recognized under civil law). In 1849, Bertha visited Friedrich Fröbel in Bad Liebenstein where she met Baroness Bertha von Marenholtz-Bülow and Johannes Ronge.

Bertha Traun, Johannes Ronge and others founded a "School for Women" (Hochschule für das weibliche Geschlecht) in 1850 in Hamburg for the general education of women with special attention to kindergarten work. However there were controversies between the women who staffed the school's board of directors and the president of the school. In this context, Bertha and Johannes fell in love, and the controversy increased. Because of the scandal, the School for Women was closed down in 1852.

The couple went to England via Holland, the latter stopping point being chosen so Christian Traun could divorce Bertha due to “desertion.” Bertha and Johannes moved to London where they married in 1851 and had a daughter Marie. By September 1851 they had opened a first kindergarten in Hampstead and the children included those of the reformer Frederic Hill. Their second Kindergarten opened in 1853 in Tavistock Place in St Pancras where the family now lived. Berthe began to train teachers at the kindergarten. The pupils at the school included Caroline Bishop who was to champion their views in England.

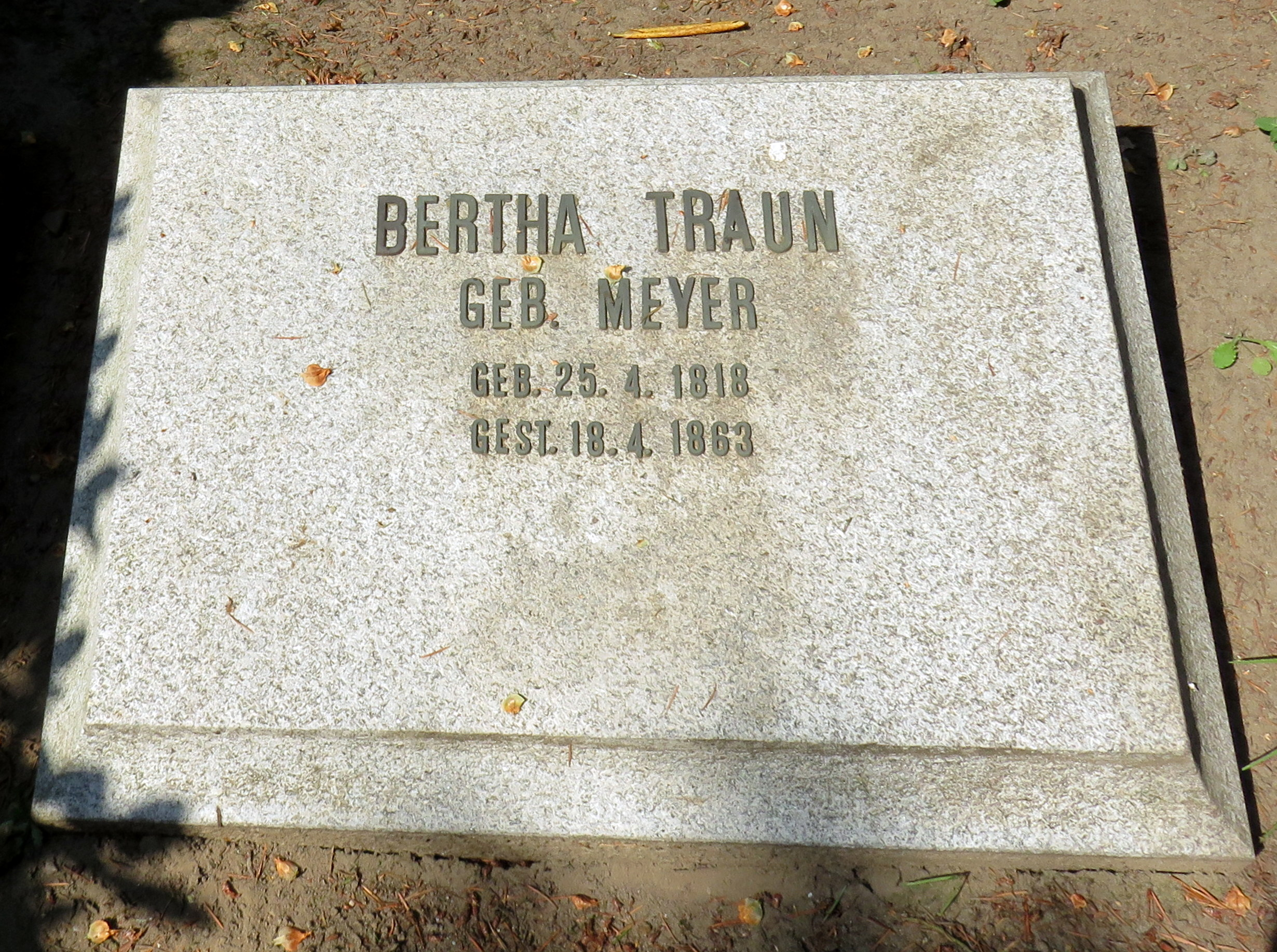
Bertha's grave (Friedhof Ohlsdorf (Hamburg)

Bertha held several lectures on the principle of the kindergarten at the home of von Marenholtz-Bülow. The Ronges moved back to Germany 10 years later, after founding kindergartens in London (1851), Manchester (1859) and Leeds (1860), and the Fröbel Society for the promotion of the Kindergarten System.

In 1861, the Ronge family moved back to Germany to Wrocław (now in Poland) and to Frankfurt in 1863 where Bertha died.

== Family ==
Her sister Margarethe married Carl Schurz and founded the first kindergarten in the United States in Watertown, Wisconsin (1856).

== Works ==
- A Practical Guide to the English Kindergarten, with Johannes Ronge (London, 1855)

== Sources ==
- Gilman, D. C.; Peck, H. T.; Colby, F. M., eds. (1905). "Ronge, Johannes" . New International Encyclopedia (1st ed.). New York: Dodd, Mead.
