= Minna Wettstein-Adelt =

German-French journalist and writer

Minna Wettstein-Adelt (1869-died around 1908, precise date unknown) was a German-French journalist and writer, who also wrote under the names Aimée Duc and Helvetia.

== Life ==
Born on 1 May 1869 in Strassburg, Minna Adelt-Duc grew up in France. She married a Swiss writer, Dr. Wettstein, and later lived in Berlin, Dresden and Munich. She edited Draisena, a journal for ladies riding bikes, and was the publisher of the Berlin Modekorrespondenz (Fashion Letter).

After the Christian Socialist Paul Göhre published an account of three months spent working in a Chemnitz machine tool factory in 1891, Wettstein-Adelt undertook a similar experiment. She worked with women at four Chemnitz factories: a stocking and glove factory, a weaving mill, and two spinning mills. Interested in extending female emancipation to the working class, she paid attention to birth control, sexual harassment, prostitution, and the burden of working women with families. However, she could be disapproving of the "beasts" and "reptiles" into whose midst she was thrown, and her main recommendation was that the "upper ten thousand" who she envisaged as her readers should become factory supervisors.

Her pseudonymously published 1901 novel Are They Women portrayed a group of "independent, intellectually driven, same-sex loving female medical students" in Switzerland: the students in the novel view themselves as a 'third sex', and at the heart of the book is a successful lesbian relationship between two of them, Minotchka and Marta.

== Works ==
- Minna Wettstein-Adelt, 3 1/2 Monate Fabrik-Arbeiterin. Eine practische Studie [Three and a Half Months as a Factory Worker. A practical study]. 1893 (online digital version).
- Aimée Duc, Sind es Frauen?: Roman über das dritte Geschlecht [Are These Women? A novel about the third sex], 1901
- Aimée Duc, Ich will [I want], 1902
- Aimée Duc, Des Pastors Liebe. Ein Modernes Sittenbild [The pastor's love. A modern portrayal of manners], 1904
