= Seamless robe of Jesus =

Robe said to have been worn by Jesus before his crucifixion

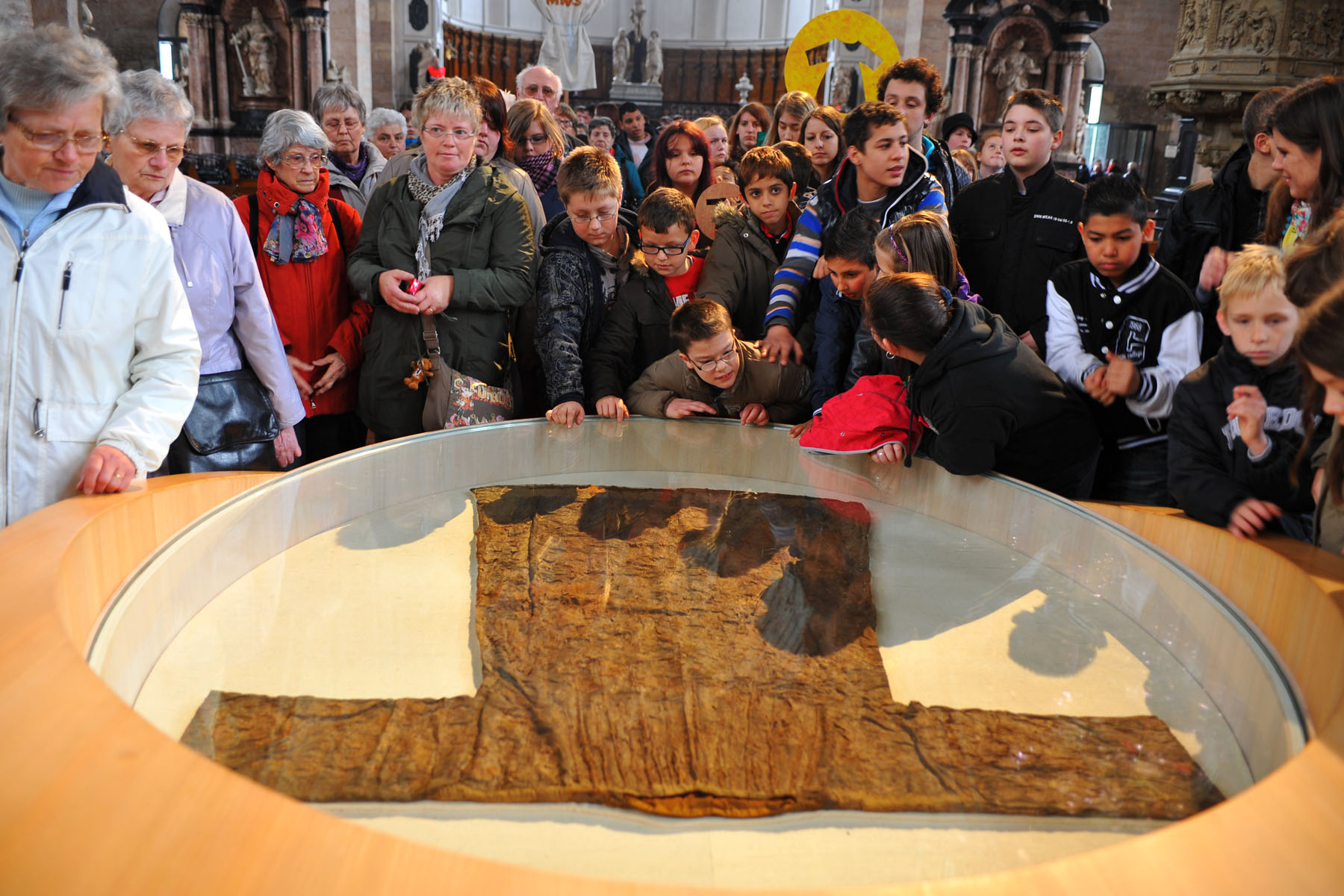
Pilgrims view one of the claimed Seamless Robes (Trier, April 2012)

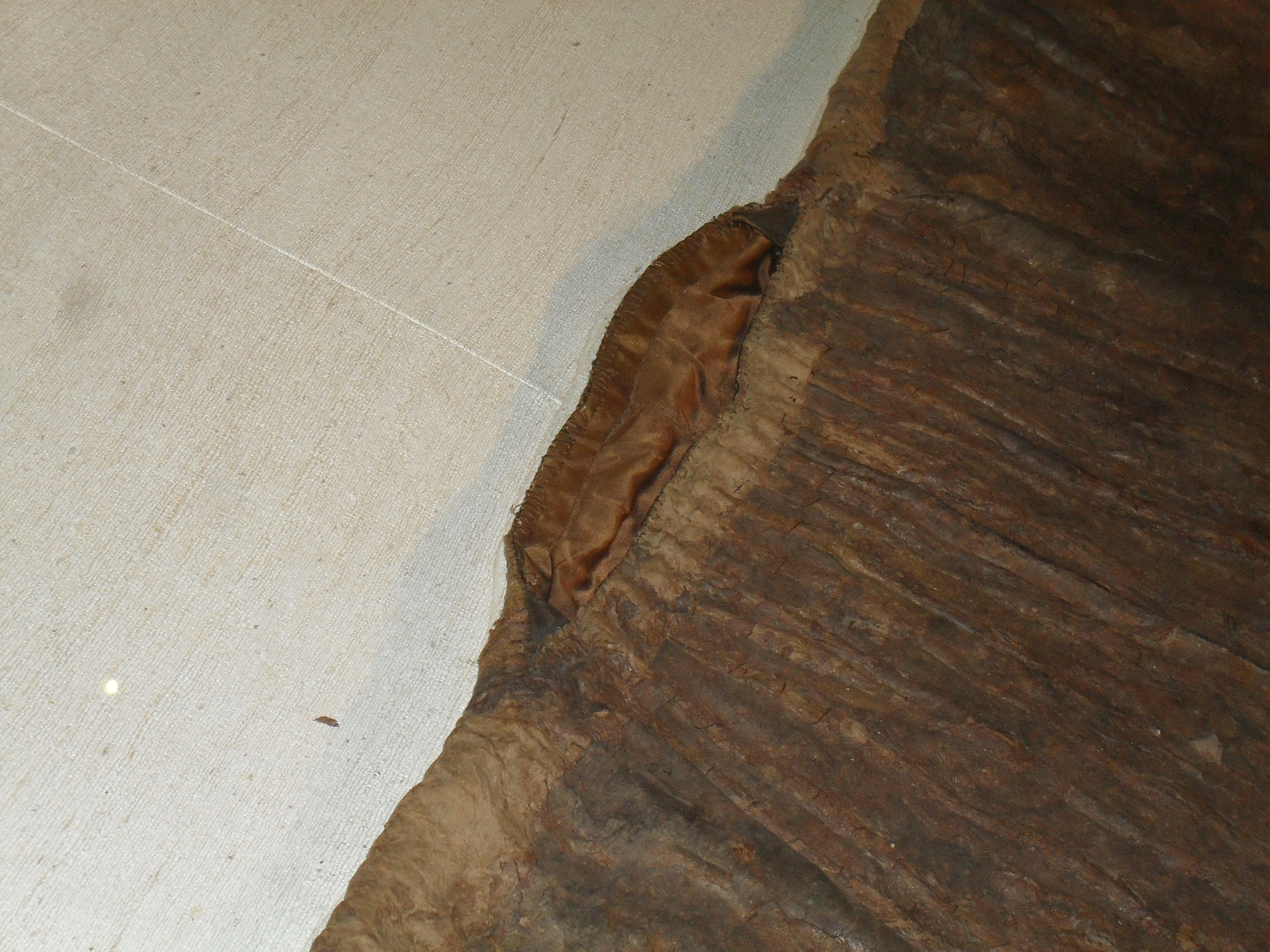
The collarless neck of one of the claimed Seamless Robes

The Seamless Robe of Jesus (also known as the Holy Robe, Holy Tunic, Holy Coat, Honorable Robe, and Chiton of the Lord) is the robe said to have been worn by Jesus during or shortly before his crucifixion. Competing traditions claim that the robe has been preserved to the present day. One tradition places it in the Cathedral of Trier, another places it in Argenteuil's Basilique Saint-Denys, and several traditions claim that it is now in various Eastern Orthodox churches, notably Svetitskhoveli Cathedral in Mtskheta, Georgia. The Tunic of Argenteuil has been dated twice to the Middle Ages using C14 dating.

== Bible passage ==
According to the Gospel of John, the soldiers who crucified Jesus did not divide his tunic after crucifying him, but cast lots to determine who would keep it because it was woven in one piece, without seam. A distinction is made in the New Testament Greek between the himatia (literally "over-garments") and the seamless robe, which is chiton (literally "tunic" or "coat").

Then the soldiers, when they had crucified Jesus, took his garments (ta himatia) and divided them into four parts, to every soldier a part, and the coat (kai ton chitona). Now the coat was without seam, woven whole from the top down. Therefore, they said among themselves, let us not tear it, but cast lots for it, whose it will become. Thus the saying in Scripture was fulfilled: they divided My raiment (ta imatia) among them, and upon My vesture (epi ton himatismon) did they cast lots.

— John 19:23–24; quoting the Septuagint version of Psalm 21 [22]:18–19

== Trier tradition ==
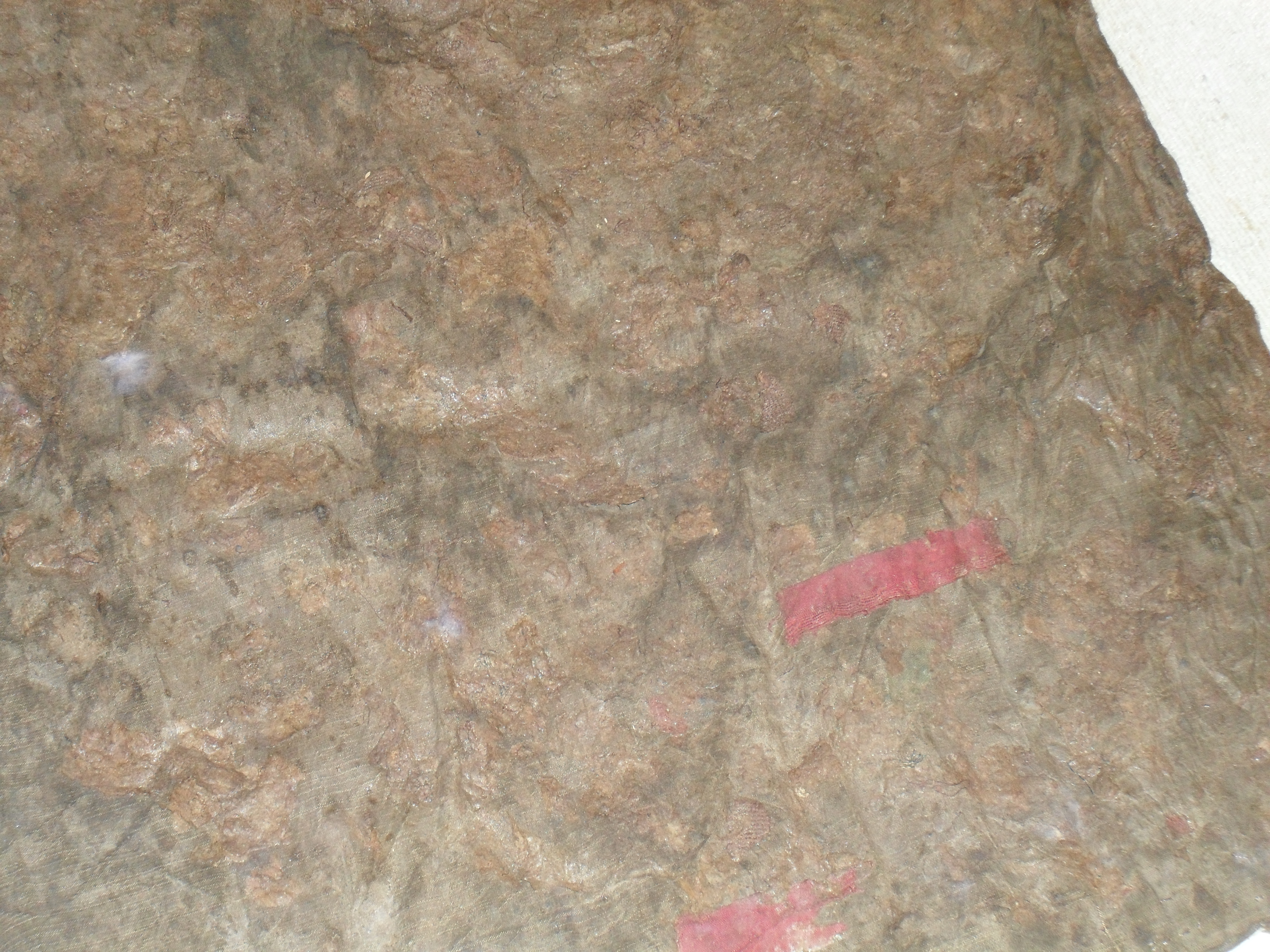
Sections of taffeta and silk on the right sleeve of the robe, Trier

According to legend, Helena, mother of Constantine the Great, discovered the seamless robe in the Holy Land in 327 or 328 along with several other relics, including the True Cross. According to different versions of the story, she either bequeathed it or sent it to the city of Trier, where Constantine had lived for some years before becoming emperor. The monk Altmann of Hautvillers wrote in the 9th century that Helena was born in that city, though this report is strongly disputed by most modern historians.

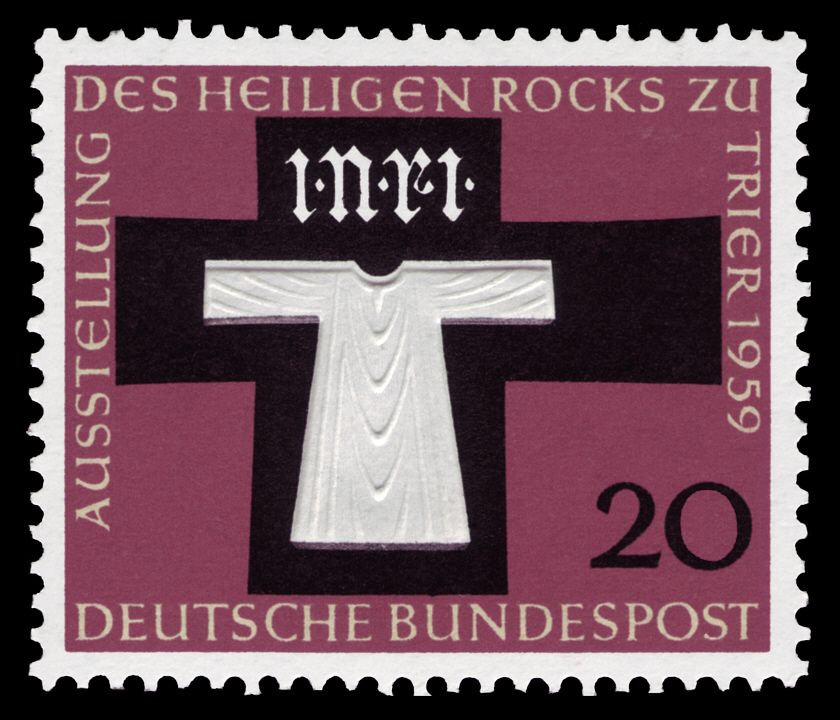
A Holy Tunic stamp, Germany, 1959

The history of the Trier robe is certain only from the 12th century, when Archbishop Johann I of Trier consecrated an altar which contained the seamless robe in early 1196. Although biographies of Johann I state that this was not the first time the robe was displayed, there are no historical dates or events presented which predate 1196. Sections of taffeta and silk have been added to the robe, and it was dipped in a rubber solution in the 19th century in an attempt to preserve it. The few remaining original sections are not suitable for carbon dating. The stigmatist Therese Neumann of Konnersreuth declared that the Trier robe was authentic.

The relic is normally kept folded in a reliquary and cannot be directly viewed by the faithful. In 1512, during an Imperial Diet, Emperor Maximilian I demanded to see the Holy Robe which was kept in the Cathedral. Archbishop Richard von Greiffenklau arranged the opening of the altar that had enshrined the tunic since the building of the Dome and exhibited it. The people of Trier heard about that and demanded to see the Holy Robe. Subsequently, pilgrimages took place first annually, then every seven years, in accordance with the Aachen pilgrimages. However, after 1545, pilgrimages were irregularly done due to warring in Europe. The pilgrimage occurrences are as follows: 1513, 1514, 1515, 1516, 1517, 1524, 1531, 1538, 1545, 1655, 1810, 1844, 1891, 1933, 1959, 1981, 1996, 2006, and 2012.

The 1844 exhibition of the relic, on the instructions of Wilhelm Arnoldi, Bishop of Trier, led to the formation of the German Catholics (Deutschkatholiken), a schismatic sect formed in December 1844 under the leadership of Johannes Ronge. The 1996 exhibition of the tunic was seen by over one million pilgrims and visitors. Since then, the Bishopric of Trier has conducted an annual ten-day religious festival called the "Heilig-Rock-Tage".

== Argenteuil tradition ==
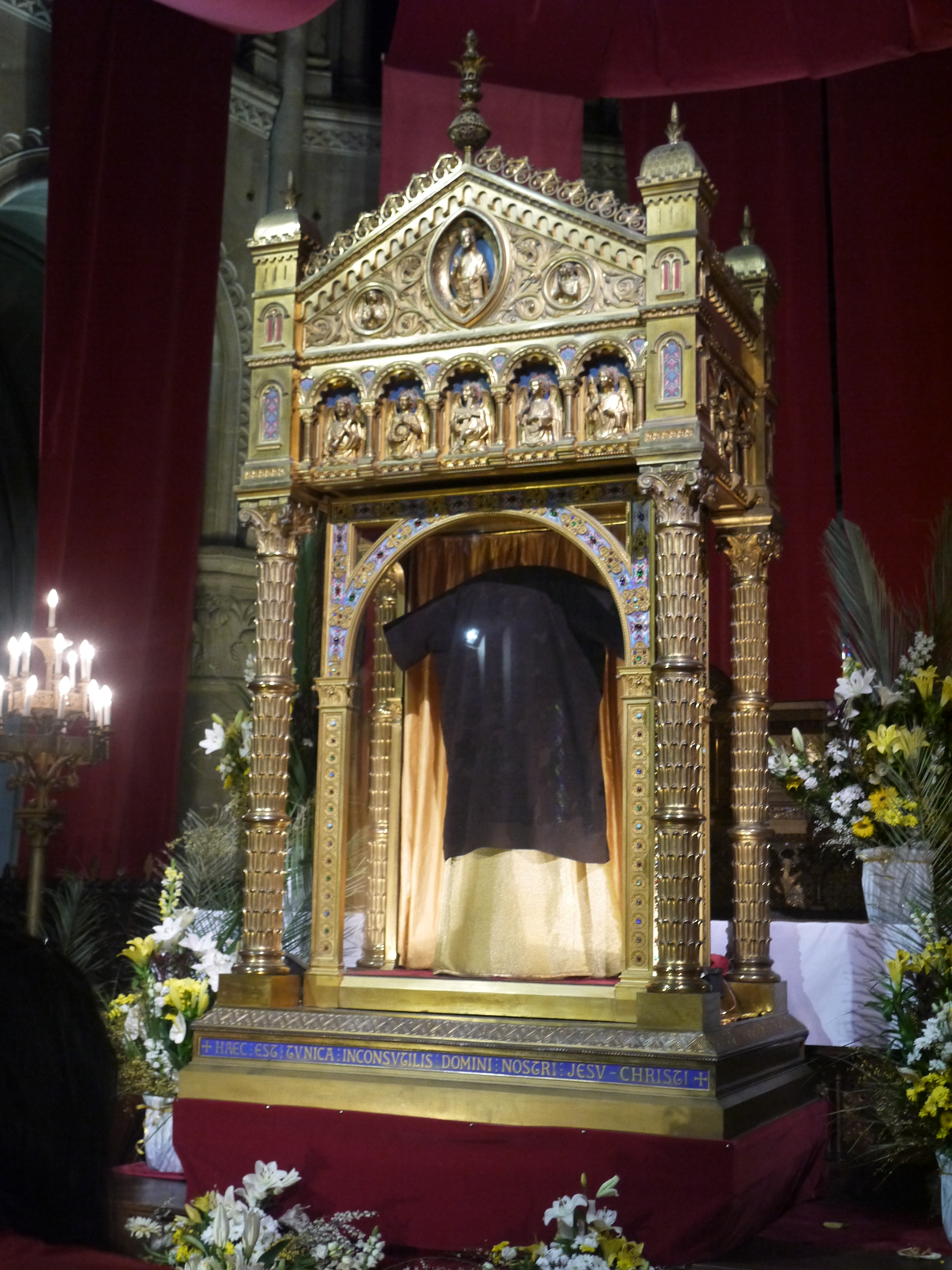
The Argentuil Tunic, on display in the Basilica of Saint-Denis d'Argentuil in 2016

According to the Argenteuil tradition, the Empress Irene made a gift of the seamless robe to Charlemagne in about 800. Charlemagne gave it to his daughter Theodrada, abbess of Argenteuil, where it was preserved in the church of the Benedictines. In 1793, the parish priest, fearing that the robe would be desecrated in the French Revolution, cut the robe into pieces and hid them in separate places. Only four of the pieces remain. They were moved to the present church of Argenteuil in 1895.

The earliest document referring to the robe at Argenteuil dates from 1156, written by Archbishop Hugh of Rouen. He described it as the garment of the child Jesus. A long-running dispute claims that the Argenteuil cloth is not the seamless robe worn by Jesus during the crucifixion, but the garments woven for him by the Virgin Mary and worn his entire life. Advocates of the theory that the Argenteuil cloth is the seamless robe claim that the Trier robe is Jesus's mantle.

== Eastern traditions ==
The Eastern Orthodox Church has also preserved a tradition regarding the clothing of Jesus which was divided among the soldiers after the crucifixion.

According to the tradition of the Georgian Orthodox Church, the chiton was acquired by a Jewish rabbi from Georgia named Elioz (Elias), who was present in Jerusalem at the time of the crucifixion and bought the robe from a soldier. He brought it with him when he returned to his native town of Mtskheta, Georgia, where it is preserved to this day beneath a crypt in the Patriarchal Svetitskhoveli Cathedral. The feast day in honor of the "Chiton of the Lord" is celebrated on 1 October.

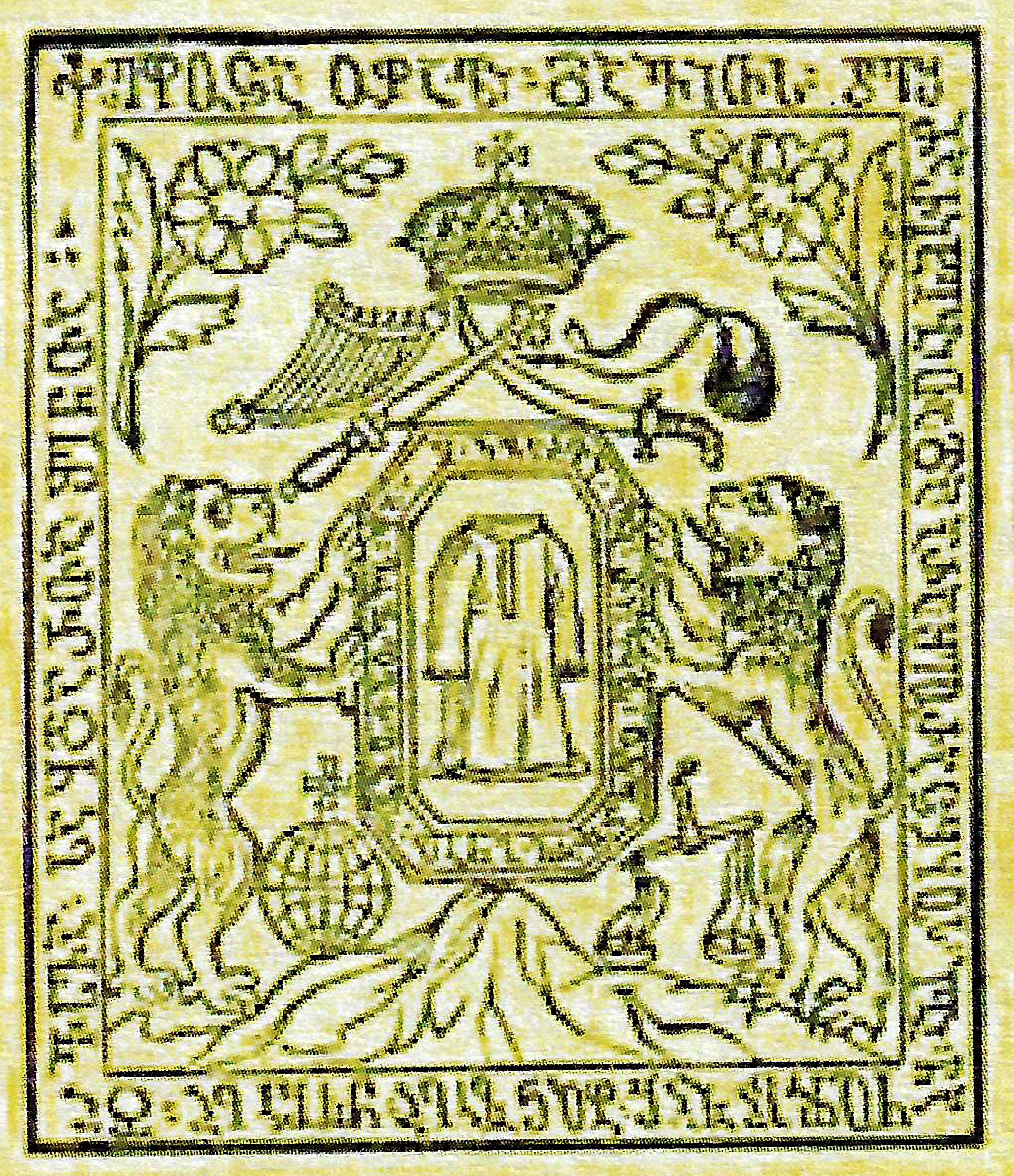
The coat of arms of the Bagrationi dynasty depicting the Holy Tunic, 1711

A portion of the himation was also brought to Georgia, but it was placed in the treasury of the Svetitskhoveli Cathedral, where it remained until the seventeenth century. Then the Persian Shah Abbas I, when he invaded Georgia, carried off the robe. At the insistence of the Russian ambassador and Tsar Michael Feodorovich, the Shah sent the robe as a gift to Patriarch Philaret (1619–1633) and Tsar Michael in 1625. The authenticity of the robe was attested by Nectarius, Archbishop of Vologda, by Patriarch Theophanes of Jerusalem and by Joannicius the Greek. Reports also circulated at that time of miraculous signs being worked through the relic.

Later, two portions of the robe were taken to Saint Petersburg: one in the cathedral at the Winter Palace, and the other in Sts. Peter and Paul Cathedral. A portion of the Robe was also preserved at the Cathedral of the Dormition in Moscow, and small portions at Kyiv's Sophia Cathedral, at the Ipatiev monastery near Kostroma and at certain other old temples.

The Russian Orthodox Church commemorates the Placing of the Honorable Robe of the Lord at Moscow on 10 July (25 July N.S.). At Moscow annually on that day, the robe is solemnly brought out of the chapel of the Apostles Peter and Paul at the Dormition cathedral, and it is placed on a stand for veneration by the faithful during the divine services. After the Divine Liturgy the robe is returned to its former place. Traditionally, on this day the propers chanted are of "the Life-Creating Cross", since the day on which the relic was actually placed was the Sunday of the Cross, during Great Lent of 1625.

== See also ==
- The Robe – 1942 novel by Lloyd C. Douglas
  - The Robe (film) – 1953 film adaptation of Douglas's book
- Consistent life ethic – ideology which applies the phrase "seamless garment" to pro-life issues beyond abortion
- Circular knitting
- German Catholics – an 1844 display of the robe led to their secession
- Relics associated with Jesus
  - Shroud of Turin
  - Sudarium of Ovideo
  - Titulus Crucis
