= Vorden =

- Former municipality and village
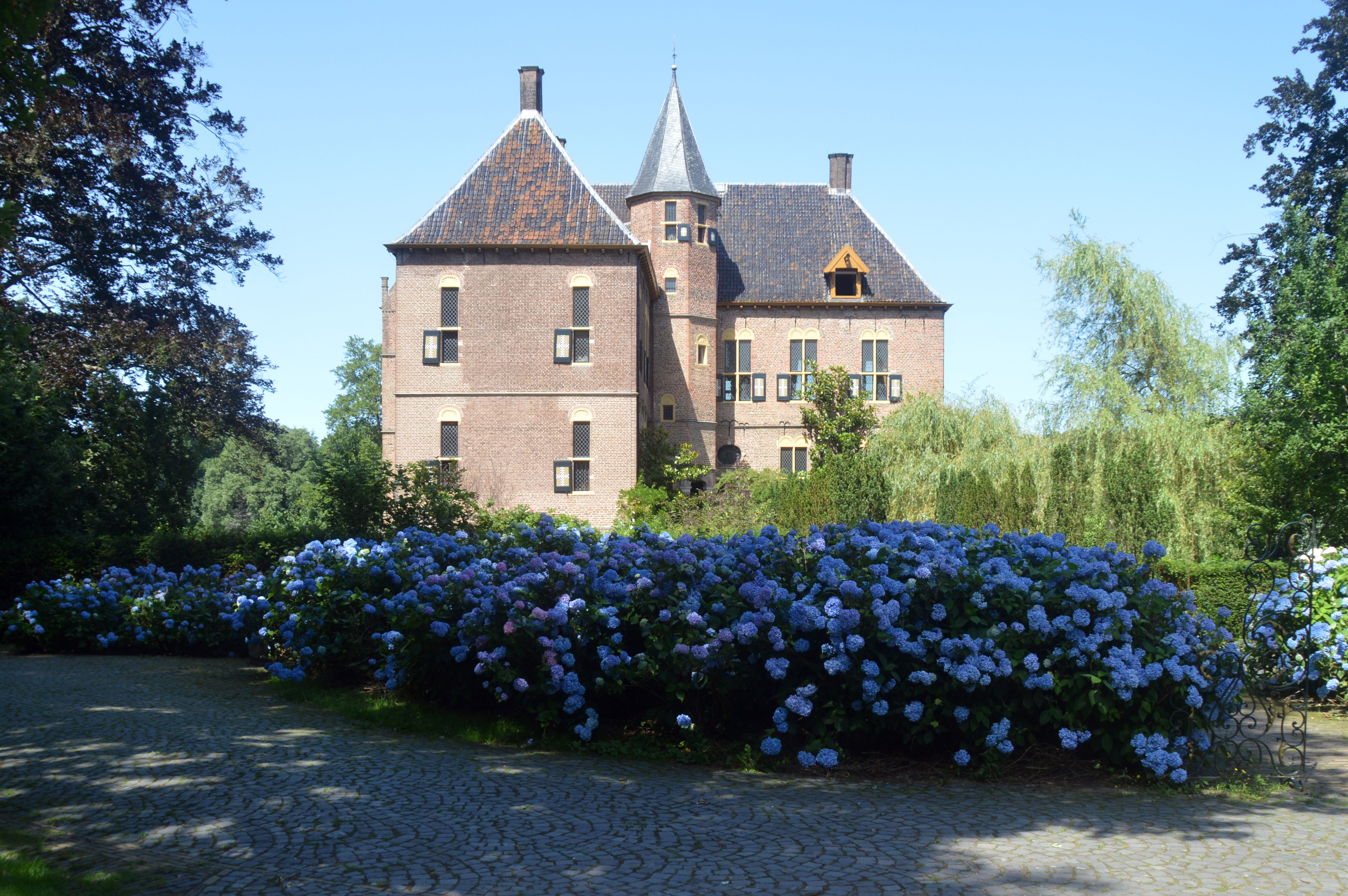
- Vorden Castle

- Flag Coat of arms

- Location in the province of Gelderland Vorden (Netherlands)
- Coordinates: 52°6′15″N 6°18′47″E
- Country: Netherlands
- Province: Gelderland
- Municipality: Bronckhorst

Area
  - Total: 67.82 km^{2} (26.19 sq mi)
- Elevation: 12 m (39 ft)

Population (2021)
  - Total: 8,180
  - Density: 121/km^{2} (312/sq mi)
- Time zone: UTC+1 (CET)
  - Summer (DST): UTC+2 (CEST)
- Postal code: 7251
- Dialing code: 0575

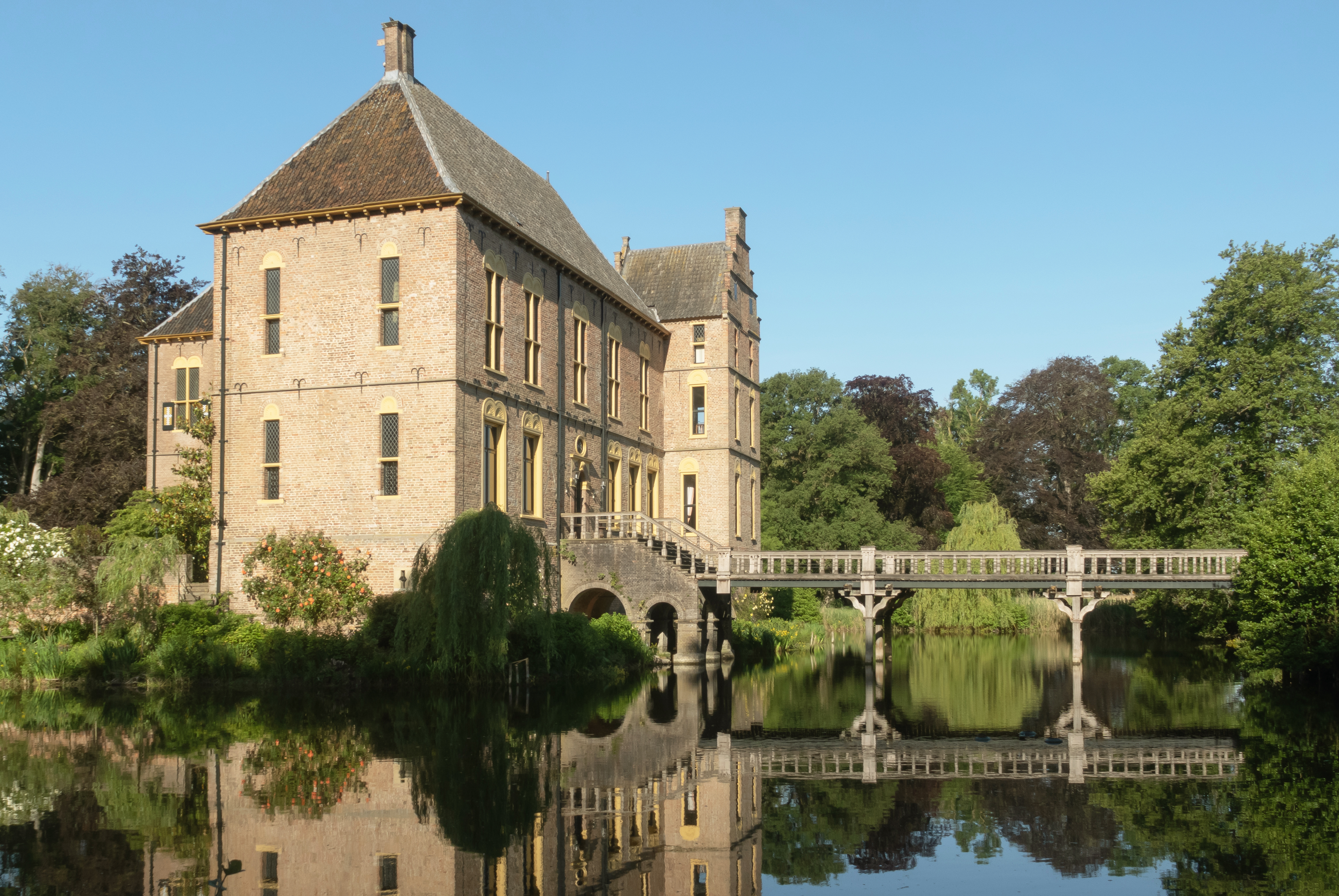
Castle: Huis Vorden

Vorden is a former municipality and a town in the eastern Netherlands, about 10 kilometres south-east of Zutphen. On 1 January 2005 the municipality merged with Hummelo en Keppel, Steenderen, Hengelo en Zelhem, to form the new municipality Bronckhorst.

Vorden is intersected by the road from Zutphen to Ruurlo (N319) and by the Baak creek (locally called Vorden Creek), which flows to the IJssel. Vorden is located on the Zutphen - Winterswijk railway line, which was opened in 1878 and has a central station on the station road.

== The town of Vorden ==
The name 'Vorden' occurred for the first time in documents from 1121 AD. The town has long had a predominantly agricultural function. At the end of the 19th and beginning of the 20th century this started to change, when some industry and self-employed started to flourish.

Vorden is known for its eight castles: Vorden (that served as town-hall), Onstein, Medler, Hackfort, Kieftskamp, Wierse, Wildenborg and Den Bramel.

The surrounding area of Vorden is known to hold equestrian events periodically including an annual fox hunt, now replaced by drag hunting, in late autumn.

== History ==
In the Middle Ages Vorden originated on a deck area located on the "Vordensche" brook, close to house Vorden. The village probably owes its name to the word 'Voorde', which means ford. In 1235 it became an independent parish. Until 2005, Vorden was an independent municipality, but as a result of a municipal reorganisation, on 1 January of that year, Vorden merged with the neighboring municipalities of Hummelo and Keppel, Steenderen, Hengelo and Zelhem to form the municipality of Bronckhorst. Other centers in the former municipality were Delden, Kranenburg, Linde, Medler, Mossel, Veldwijk, Vierakker, Wichmond, Wientjesvoort and Wildenborch.

In 2014, the centre of Vorden was redesigned, with a number of roads being moved and in some places the pavements were also made wider. In addition, trees have been planted and a new parking lot has been laid out for long-term parkers.

== Castle village ==
Vorden is best known for the eight castles it has, making it one of the most castles-rich villages in the Netherlands. House Vorden is on the outskirts of the village, the other seven are in a circle around it.

House Vorden was first mentioned in 1315. In 1580, during the Eighty Years' War, it was looted and restored thirty years later. In 1976 it was restored and functioned as a town hall. In 2004, the municipality of Vorden sold the castle to a private individual. Since then the castle has been used as a wedding location.

Hackfort Castle was first mentioned in 1324. After being partially destroyed by a fire in 1586, during the Eighty Years' War, it was rebuilt. The current façade in Louis XVI style got it in 1788. Nowadays it is divided into apartments.

Castle Den Bramel of the version mentioned for the first time in 1396 and that from about 1645, little more remains; the current building dates largely from the period 1720–1726.

The Kieftskamp Castle in Louis XV style, was erected in 1776. In 1920 and 1930 it was expanded.

The Wildenborch Castle is a former manor, first mentioned in 1372. After devastation in 1490 it was rebuilt between 1523 and 1533. In the 17th century it was largely demolished. The remaining gate tower became part of a new country house built in 1782. The son of the clients was the poet Anthony Staring, who lived there from 1791 to 1840. The rebuilding of 1847 was undone in 1931.

De Wiersse Castle was first mentioned in 1288. In the meantime, it was rebuilt in 1681. In the 18th century and in 1925 it underwent renovations.

Castle Onstein, in Louis XIV style, was built in 1711 on a spot where a mansion from 1613 had previously stood. Nowadays in the possession of Hans Melchers.

The Medler Castle, is a mansion dating from the 17th century, which was later renovated several times.

The Enzerinck Castle, is a neoclassical country house built in 1835–1836. The Wientjesvoort dating from 1850 has the same style.

== Public Services ==
Shops and Supermarkets: The majority of the stores can be found at the Dorpsstraat, Zutphenseweg, Burgemeester Galleestraat and the Raadhuisstraat. There are several supermarkets, drug stores and clothing stores.

Weekly market: Every week a market takes place on Friday morning in the center of Vorden, around the N.H. Church. The weekly market includes fish stalls, baker's stalls, and food stalls / sellers.

Schools: Vorden has five primary schools: the Dorpsschool (public), the Vordering (Catholic), the Hoge (Christian) and the Kraanvogel (neighborhood Kranenburg). Since autumn 2014, the Hofakker has been added, for education on an anthroposophical basis. Vorden also has secondary school 't Beeckland (VMBO); this is part of the Ulenhof College in Doetinchem.

== Cycling and Walking routes ==
- The eight-castle route is 33 kilometers in total and there are eight castles on the way.
- The Berend Route, a bike ride of about 20 kilometers around Vorden.
- The Pieterpad runs through Vorden. The route leads from Pieterburen on the Groningen Wadden Sea coast to the Sint-Pietersberg near Maastricht.
- The Trekvogelpad (migratory bird route) crosses the Pieterpad in Vorden at castle Vorden and runs from Bergen aan Zee to Enschede.
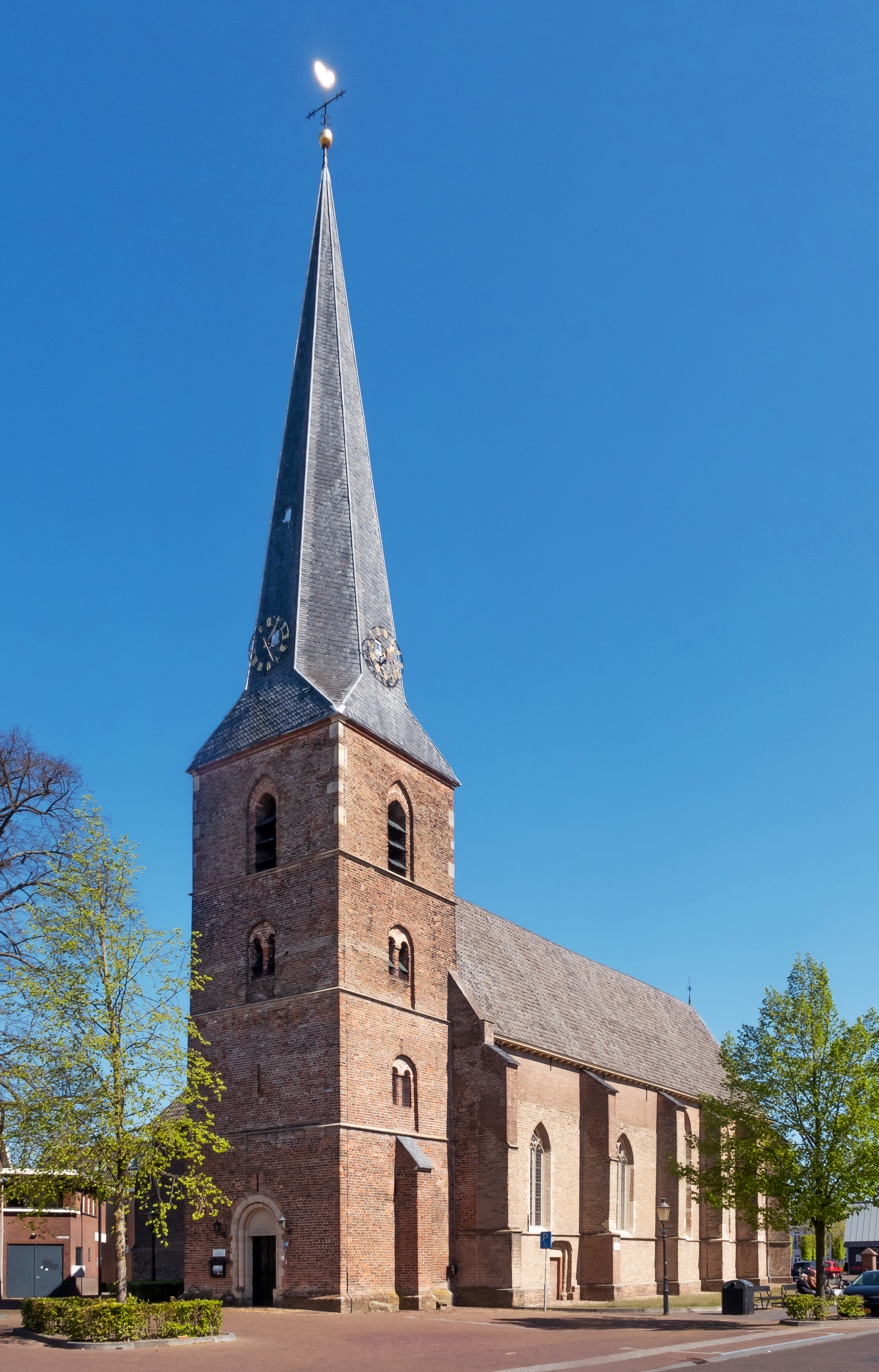
Vorden, church: the Antoniuskerk

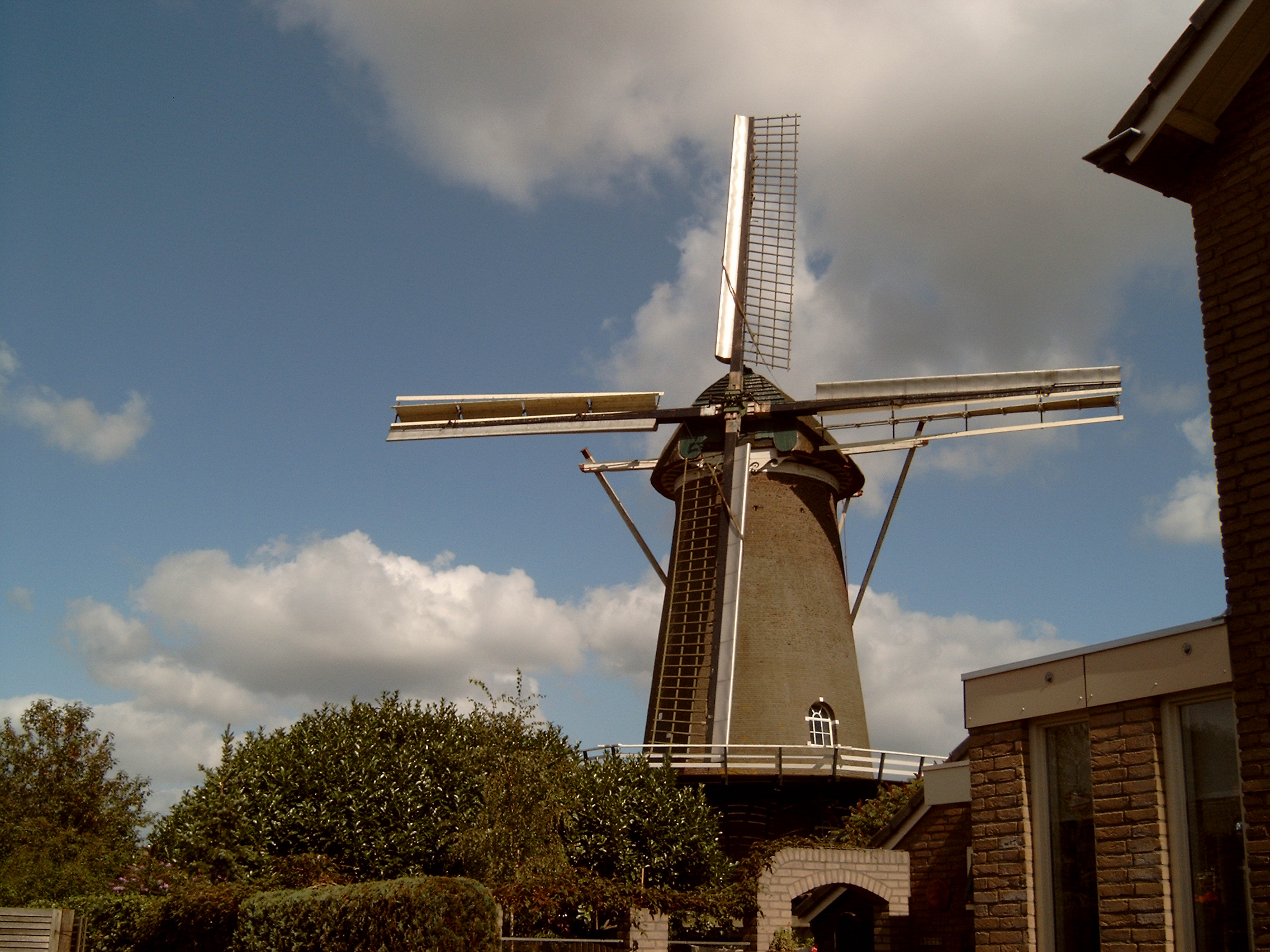
Vorden, windmill

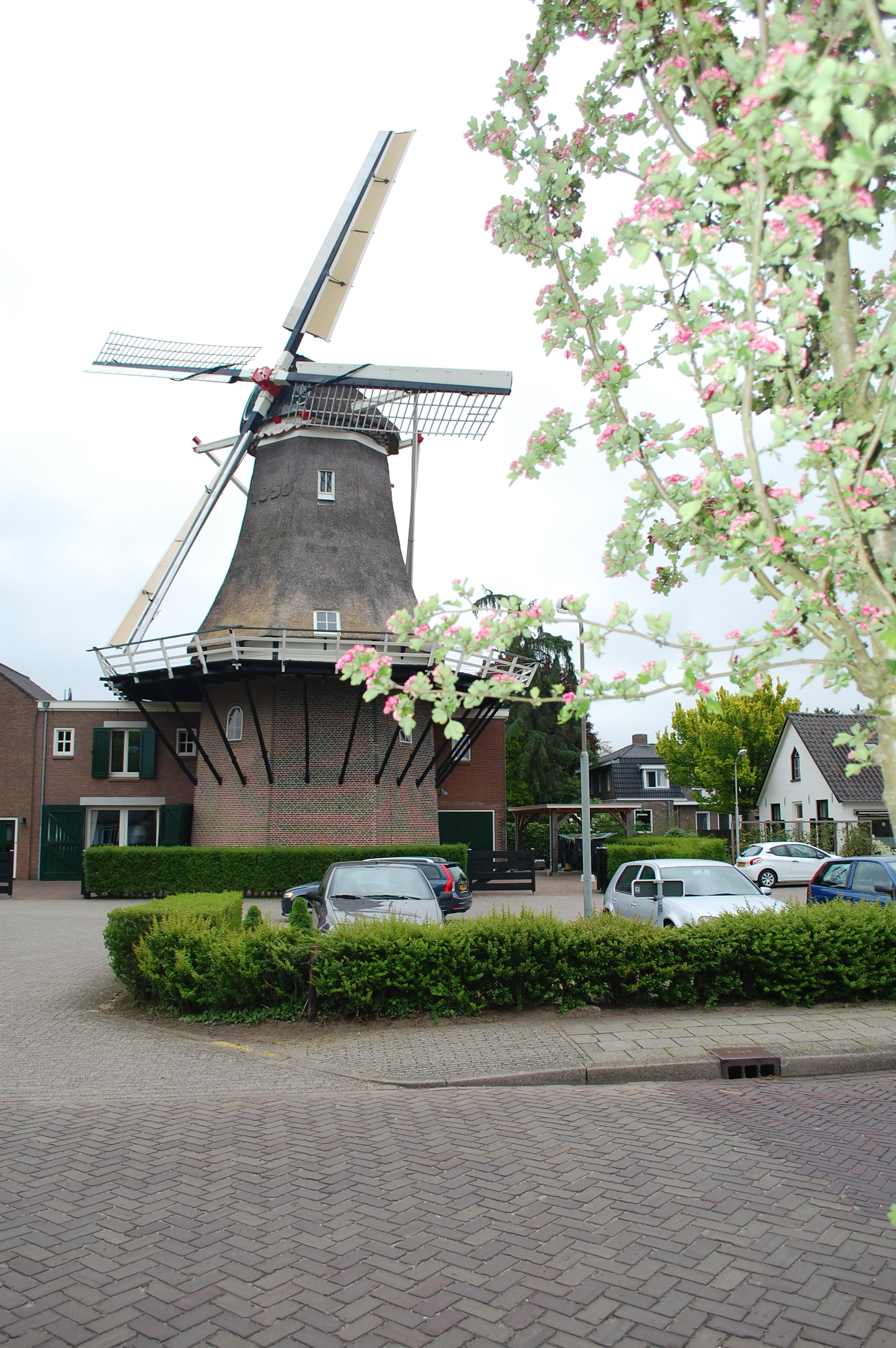
Windmill in Vorden

== Notable people ==
- Henrica Iliohan (1850–1921), suffragist
- Niels Koolen (born 2001), racing driver
