= Friends of the Light =

German union of Free Congregations, or German rationalists

The Friends of the Light was an association of German rationalists.

== Origins ==
It originated in the Province of Saxony, in 1841. The members were also called Protestant Friends. The immediate occasion was an attempt to discipline a Magdeburg preacher who had expressed heretical views. Early leaders in the movement were Leberecht Uhlich and Gustav Adolf Wislicenus, both of whom were forced out of the Evangelical Church for expressing liberal views. In like manner, independent congregations arose in a number of places. In 1847, a union was effected between them on the basis of a simple profession of faith in God and called Free Congregations (Ger. freie Gemeinden). By this time their gatherings, held symbolically in the open air, had come to number more than two thousand, including delegates from England and America.

In 1850, they united with the German Catholics, and in the same year and the years immediately following some forty congregations were established in the United States, but had a short existence. After the Revolutions of 1848, several of the German governments undertook to suppress them, partly for political reasons. Many congregations were broken up. Those still in existence in 1859, about fifty in number, under Uhlich's leadership, formed a “Union of Free Congregations in Germany,” upon a highly rationalistic basis. Inasmuch as the fullest individual liberty was allowed, the belief of members and congregations varied greatly. There was a tendency toward radical free thought, and some even denied the existence of a personal God. The association was strongest in Berlin, Breslau, and Magdeburg. Its numbers and influence gradually diminished. It was superseded by the Old Catholic Church.

== Notable members ==
- Fritz Müller

== See also ==
- Old and New Lights
- Religious humanism
