= Fanny J. Bayrhoffer Thelen =

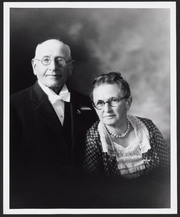
Edmund Thelen and Fanny J. Bayrhoffer Thelen

Franziska "Fanny" Johanna Mathilde Bayrhoffer Thelen (November 15, 1856 – April 28, 1939) was a member of the Women's Committee of the Panama–California Exposition in 1915 and of the San Diego County Woman's Board of the State and National Defense.

== Early life ==
Franziska Bayrhoffer was born on November 15, 1856, in Monroe, Wisconsin, the daughter of Karl Theodor Bayrhoffer (1812–1888) and Charlotte Elisabeth Dratz.

== Career ==
She was a member of the Library Board and authorized press correspondent for the board. She served as a National City Library board member for a number of years. She was a member of the Board of Directors of the San Diego Community Service. For three years she was the president of San Diego Children's Home. She was a member of the Women's Committee of the Panama–California Exposition in 1915 in San Diego. She was a member of San Diego County Woman's Board of the State and National Defense. She received a Red Cross Medal for services during the war. She visited the Naval Hospital every week and brought gifts to veterans and service-men. She was a member of the American Association of University Women, National City Friday Club and several other organizations.

== Personal life ==
Bayrhoffer moved to California in 1888 and lived at 327 East First St., National City, California. On January 6, 1880, in Omaha, Nebraska, she married Edmund Thelen (1851–1934) and had three children: Max (1880–1972), Paul (1881–1948), and Rolf (1883–1925).

She died on April 28, 1939, and is buried at National City, California.

== Legacy ==
Her son Max Thelen, a San Francisco attorney, donated the Thelen Shelf, a memorial to his parents, at the National City Library.
