= Leberecht Uhlich =

German clergyman

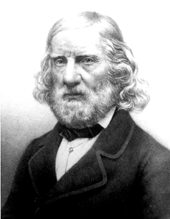

Religious life
- Religion: Christianity

Leberecht Uhlich (1799–1872) was a German clergyman and one of the founders of the German Free Congregations.

== Biography ==
He studied at Halle, and served as pastor in various places till 1847, when he withdrew from the Evangelical Church, and thenceforth was preacher of the Free Congregation at Magdeburg. In 1841, he became the leader of the Friends of the Light (also called Protestant Friends). His liberal views frequently involved him in difficulties with the authorities. He published Bekenntnisse (4th ed. 1846); Christentum und Kirche (2d ed. 1846); Die Throne im Himmel und auf Erden (1845); Handbüchlein der freien Religion (7th ed. 1889). His autobiography appeared at Gera in 1872.
