= Walter Wislicenus =

German astronomer

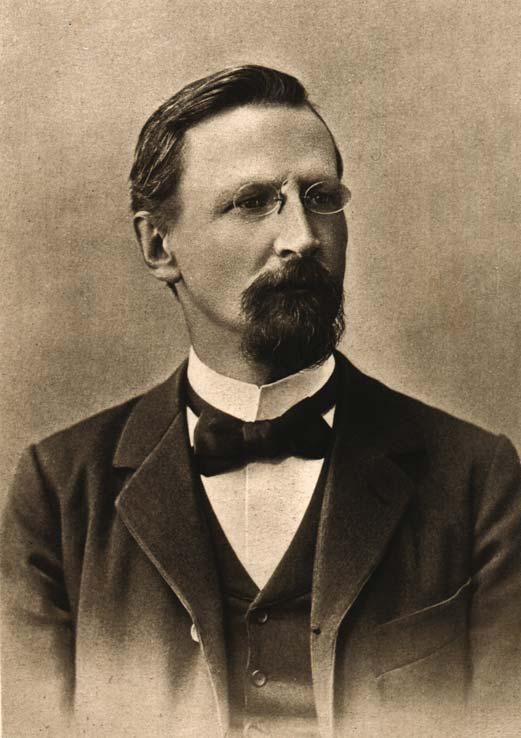
Walter Wislicenus.

Walter Friedrich Wislicenus (November 5, 1859 – October 3, 1905) was a German astronomer. He taught at the University of Strasbourg starting in 1888, and was a professor from 1897 until his death. He was known for his lectures given outside of academia that attracted many non-scientists, and for his publications for the interested public.

== Biography ==
He was born in Halberstadt as the son of a preacher, and the nephew of Gustav Adolf Wislicenus, founder of the "free religious movement" in Germany.

After only one year of studies in Leipzig he decided to move to Strasbourg in 1880, where a new observatory was close to completion. In 1882 he joined an expedition to observe the transit of Venus at Bahía Blanca as an assistant. In 1883 he started to work for the Strasbourg Observatory. He was the main observer for the catalogue of southern stars, created from 1884 to 1888. He received his Ph.D in 1886 publishing works on the rotational period of Mars.

A crater on Mars and the asteroid 4588 Wislicenus are named in his honor.
