= Gustav Adolf Wislicenus =

German theologian (1803–1875)

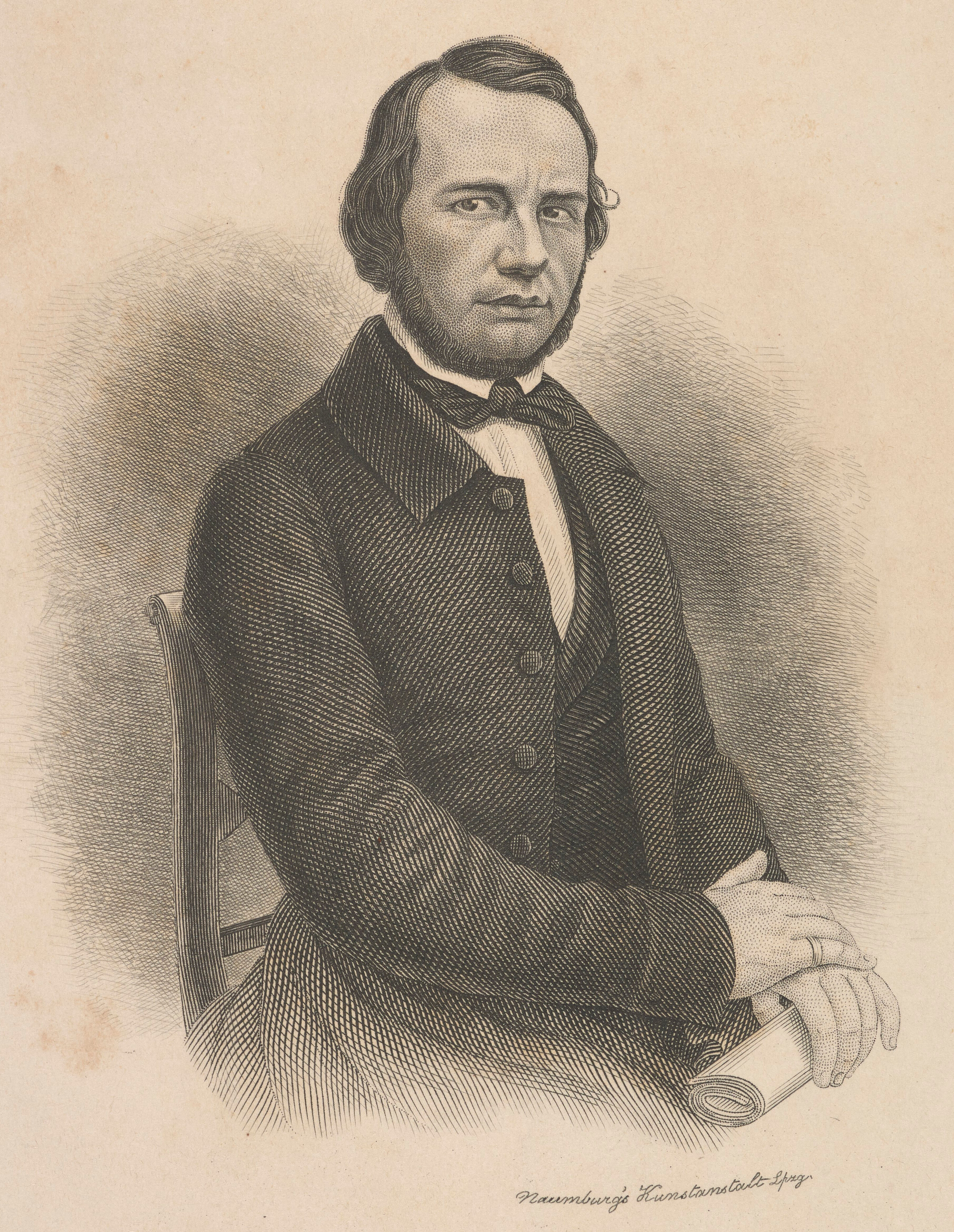
Gustav Adolf Wislicenus

Gustav Adolf Wislicenus (German pronunciation: [ˈɡʊstaf ˈʔaːdɔlf vɪsliˈtseːnʊs]; 20 November 1803 in Battaune, Prussian Saxony – 14 October 1875 in Fluntern, part of Zurich) was a German theologian, one of the leaders of the Free Congregations.

== Biography ==
He studied theology at Halle, and as member of the Burschenschaft was sentenced in 1824 to twelve years' confinement in a fortress. He was pardoned in 1829 and continued his studies in Berlin. In 1841 he became pastor at Halle, and became associated with the Friends of Light, and in consequence of a lecture delivered at Köthen in 1844, he was deprived of his pastorate in 1846. He then became a preacher of the free congregation at Halle.

His pamphlet "Die Bibel im Lichte der Bildung unserer Zeit" caused him to be sentenced to two years' imprisonment in 1853, and he fled to America, lectured at first in Boston and in 1854 he established a school at Hoboken, New Jersey. Returning to Europe in 1856, he opened a school in Zurich, where he wrote his principal work, "Die Bibel, für denkende Leser betrachtet" (The Bible for thoughtful readers, 2d ed. 1866).

He was the father of chemist Johannes Wislicenus and supported natural scientists from the free religious movements who sought a middle ground between atheism and Christiam dogmatism.

== Additional works by Wislicenus ==
- Ob Schrift? Ob Geist? (Leipsig; 4th ed. 1845) – Published as a result of a denunciation by Ferdinand Guericke, a professor of theology at Halle.
- Nachrichten uber die freie Gemeinde in Halle (Halle, 1847).
- Beitrage zur Forderung der Religion der Menschlichkeit (ibid. 1850).
- Aus Amerika (Leipsig, 1854).
- Gegenwart und Zukunft der Religion (Leipsig, 1873).
