= Johannes Czerski =

German clergyman

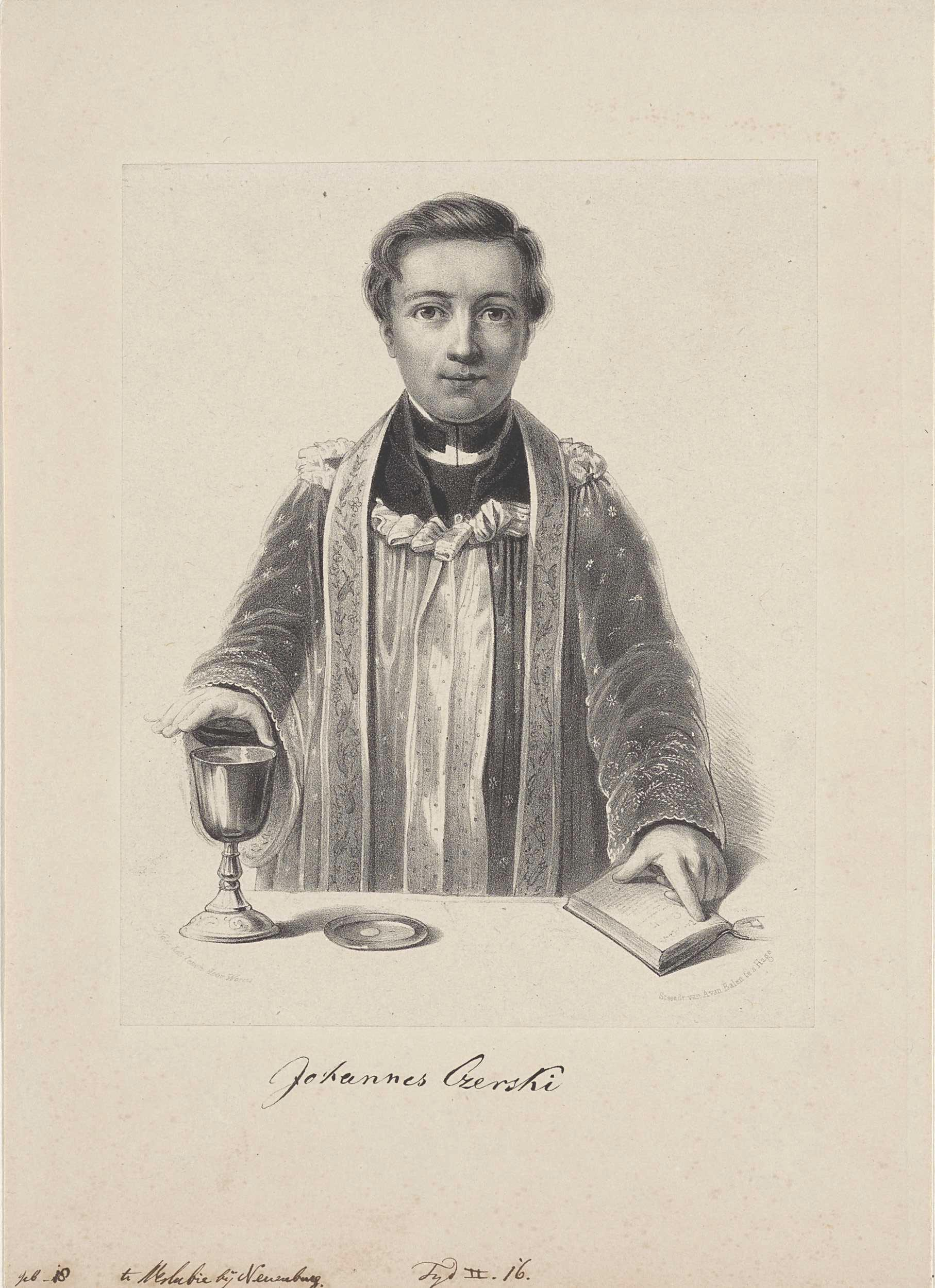
- Born: 12th of March 1813; Warlubien, West Prussia. Modern day Poland
- Died: 22nd of December 1893
- Occupation: Clergyman
- Notable work: Nachlass des sterbenden Papsttums. Rechtfertigung meines Abfalles von der römischen Hofkirche.

Johannes Czerski (12 May 1813 – 22 December 1893) was a German clergyman, one of the founders of German Catholicism.

== Biography ==
He was born at Warlubien, West Prussia, and was educated at the priests' seminary at Posen, and ordained in 1842. He was first appointed as vicar at the cathedral in Posen. In March 1844, he became vicar in Schneidemühl (now Piła) in Province of Posen. Sentenced to penitential confinement for contracting a secret marriage in 1844, he resigned his vicariate, and founded an independent community of Catholics, known as the “Christlich-Apostolisch-Katholische Gemeinde” (Christian-Apostolic Catholic Congregation).

He participated in the struggles of Johannes Ronge and the German Catholics. He dissented from the creed based on Ronge's “Confession of Breslau” adopted by the council which met at Leipzig, March 22, 1845: he took a more conservative viewpoint than Ronge, in particular maintaining the divinity of Jesus. His views were set out in his “Confession of Schneidemühl,” which rejected the reception by the priests alone of the Lord's supper in both kinds, the canonization and invocation of saints, indulgences and purgatory, fasting, the use of the Latin language in divine service, the celibacy of priests, the prohibition of mixed marriages, the supremacy of the pope, and other points. Upon the downfall of the German Catholics, he devoted himself to quiet religious activity.

== Works ==
His most important work is the Nachlass des sterbenden Papsttums (12th ed., 1870). He defended his defection from the Roman Catholic Church in the work entitled Rechtfertigung meines Abfalles von der römischen Hofkirche (1845).

== Bibliography ==
- "Czerski". Meyers Konversations-Lexikon (in German) (4th ed.). 1885–1892.

Attribution
