= Johannes Wislicenus =

German chemist (1835–1902)

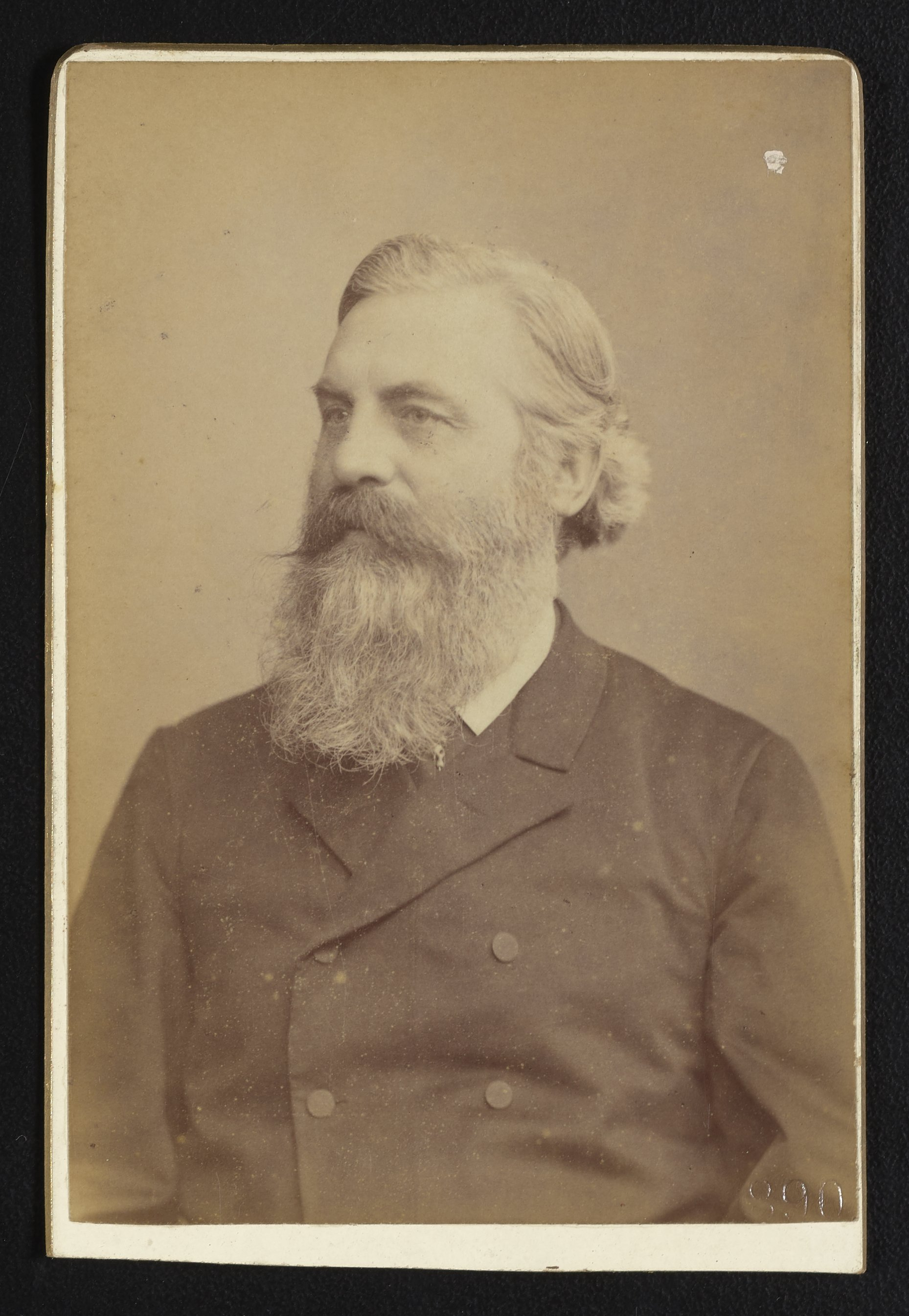
- Wislicenus c. 1902
- Born: 24 June 1835; Kleineichstedt, Prussian Saxony
- Died: 5 December 1902 (aged 67); German Empire
- Education: University of Halle-Wittenberg
- Known for: Stereochemistry
- Awards: Davy Medal (1898); ForMemRS (1897)
- Scientific career
- Fields: Chemistry
- Workplaces: University of Zürich; University of Würzburg; University of Leipzig
- Doctoral students: Carl Bosch; William Henry Perkin; Harold Carpenter

Johannes Wislicenus (German pronunciation: [joˈhanəs vɪsliˈtseːnʊs]; 24 June 1835 – 5 December 1902) was a German chemist, most famous for his work in early stereochemistry.

== Biography ==
The son of the radical Protestant theologian Gustav Wislicenus, Johannes was born on 24 June 1835 in Kleineichstedt (now part of Querfurt, Saxony-Anhalt) in Prussian Saxony, and entered University of Halle-Wittenberg in 1853. In October 1853 he immigrated to the United States with his family. For a brief time he acted as assistant to Harvard chemist Eben Horsford, and in 1855 was appointed lecturer at the Mechanics' Institute in New York. Returning to Europe in 1856, he continued to study chemistry with Wilhelm Heinrich Heintz at the University of Halle. In 1860, he began lecturing at the University of Zürich, and at the Swiss Polytechnical Institute and by 1868 he was Professor of Chemistry at the university. In 1870, he was chosen to succeed Georg Staedeler as Professor of General Chemistry at the Swiss Polytechnical Institute in Zürich, retaining also the position of full professor at the University of Zürich. In 1872, he succeeded Adolph Strecker in the chair of chemistry at University of Würzburg, and in 1885, he succeeded Hermann Kolbe as Professor of Chemistry at the University of Leipzig, where he died on 6 December 1902.

== Research ==
By the late 1860s, Wislicenus devoted his research to organic chemistry. His work on the isomeric lactic acids from 1868 to 1872 resulted in the discovery of two substances with different physical properties but with an identical chemical structure. He called this difference "geometrical isomerism". He would later promote J. H. van't Hoff's theory of the tetrahedral carbon atom, believing that it, together with the supposition that there are "specially directed forces, the affinity-energies", which determine the relative position of atoms in the molecule, afforded a method by which the spatial arrangement of atoms in particular cases may be ascertained by experiment. While at Würzburg, Wislicenus developed the use of ethyl aceto acetate in organic synthesis. However, he was also active in inorganic chemistry, finding a reaction for the production of sodium azide. He was the first to prepare cyclopentane in 1893

== Awards ==
In 1898 Wislicenus was awarded the Davy Medal by the Royal Society of London.
