= Georg Städeler =

German chemist (1821–1871)

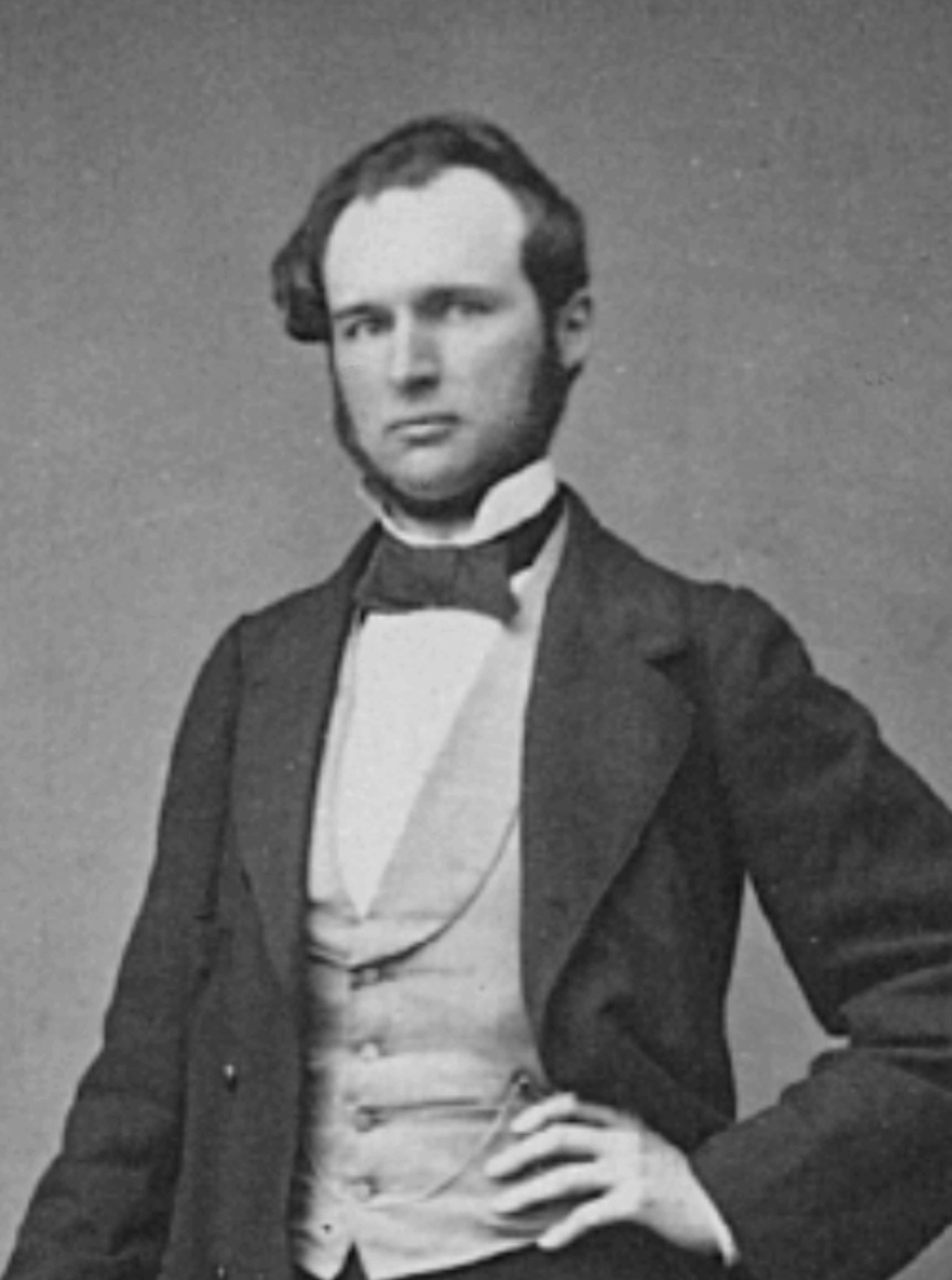
Georg Städeler (ca. 1854)

Georg Andreas Karl Städeler (25 March 1821, Hanover – 11 January 1871, Hanover) was a German chemist.

He studied chemistry and botany at the Göttingen, where his influences included Friedrich Wöhler. In 1851 he became an associate professor of physiological chemistry at Göttingen, and later on, he relocated to the University of Zürich, where from 1853 to 1870, he worked as a professor of general chemistry. During this time period (1855–70), he was also a professor of chemistry at the Eidgenössische Technische Hochschule in Zürich.

He made contributions in his research of uric acid and in his extensive studies of tyrosine and bile pigments. Städeler's book on the chemical analysis of inorganic bodies was published over numerous editions.

== Published works ==
- Ueber das Vorkommen von Leucin und Tyrosin in der menschlichen Leber, 1855 (with Friedrich Theodor von Frerichs) – On the presence of leucine and tyrosine in the human liver.
- Leitfaden für die qualitative chemische Analyse anorganischer Körper. (5th edition, 1871) Guidelines for qualitative chemical analysis of inorganic bodies.
- Untersuchungen über das Aceton – Studies of acetone.
