= German Catholics (sect) =

German catholic dissidence movement

The German Catholics (German: Deutschkatholiken) were formed in December 1844 by German dissidents from the Catholic Church, under the leadership of Johannes Ronge. The movement originated in Breslau (now Wrocław). They were joined for a time by somewhat more conservative dissidents under the leadership of Johannes Czerski. This latter movement took the name of Christian Catholics and originated in Schneidemühl (now Piła).

== Controversy over robe exposition ==
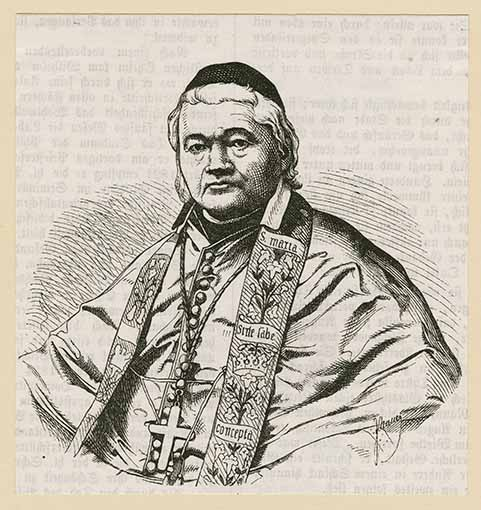
Wilhelm Arnoldi, bishop of Trier

In the 15 October 1844 issue of the Sächsische Vaterlandsblätter, Johannes Ronge, a Roman Catholic priest in Silesia, published a vigorous attack upon Wilhelm Arnoldi, bishop of Trier since 1842, for having ordered (for the first time since 1810) the exposition of the alleged seamless robe of Jesus, an event that drew countless pilgrims to the cathedral. Bishop Arnoldi had proclaimed that the artifact had healing powers, and accompanied the exhibition of the holy coat by a promise of plenary indulgence to whoever should make a pilgrimage to Trier to honor it. Ronge denounced the projected pilgrimages as idolatry.

Ronge, who had formerly been chaplain at Grottkau, was then a schoolmaster at Laurahütte. He had already been suspended from his charge on account of his independent views. Ronge's article made a great sensation, and led to his excommunication by the chapter of Breslau in December 1844. The ex-priest received much public sympathy, and a dissenting congregation calling itself the "New Catholics" was soon formed at Breslau. They were later forced to change their name from "New Catholics" to "German Catholics".

== Early growth ==
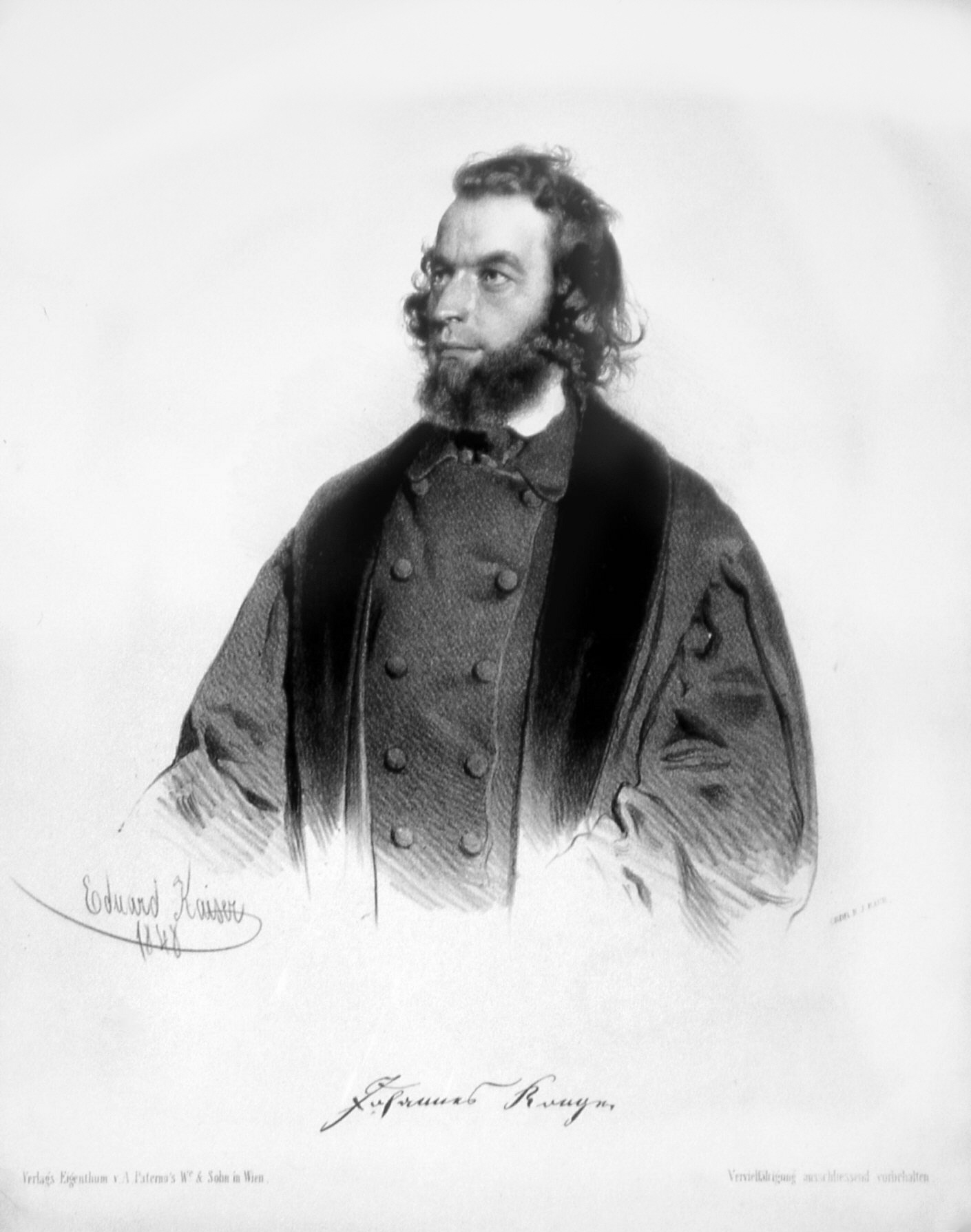
Johannes Ronge

Within less than a year, the German Catholics grew to over 8,000 members. Communities were formed at Leipzig, Dresden, Berlin, Offenbach am Main, Worms, Wiesbaden and several other locations. The movement garnered support from Robert Blum, a newspaper publisher in Leipzig. Blum published writings of the new movement and helped to organize it. Magdeburg was also prominent among the towns where congregations belonging to the new body were formed. There an instructor named Kote was a prominent worker.

Even before the beginning of the agitation led by Ronge, another movement fundamentally distinct, though in some respects similar, had been originated at Schneidemuhl, Posen, under the guidance of Johannes Czerski, also a priest, who had come into collision with the church authorities on the then much discussed question of mixed marriages, and also on that of the celibacy of the clergy. The result had been his suspension from office in March 1844; his public withdrawal, along with twenty-four adherents, from the Roman communion in August; his excommunication; and the formation, in October, of a "Christian Catholic" congregation which, while rejecting clerical celibacy, the use of Latin in public worship, and the doctrines of purgatory and transubstantiation, retained the Nicene theology and the doctrine of the seven sacraments. Together Ronge and Czerski appealed to the lower grades of the clergy to unite in founding a National German Church independent of the Pope and governed by councils and synods.

== Leipzig council ==
A council convened at Leipzig at Easter (March) 1845 to deliberate on the affairs of the body. Twenty-seven congregations were represented by delegates, of whom only two or at most three were in clerical orders. The council proceeded under the presidency of Professor Wigard to arrange a system of doctrine and practice which was to form the basis of union for the whole Church. The Bible was recognized as the sole standard of faith and its interpretation was left to reason, "penetrated and animated" by the Christian idea. Only two sacraments were admitted: baptism and the Lord's Supper. In matters of ritual, each congregation was left free to carry into practice its own views. Each congregation was to choose its own pastor and elders. Affairs of a general interest were entrusted to the management of a general council to meet every five years, but the decisions of this council were to be ratified by a majority of the congregations before they came valid. The authority of the Pope was not recognized.

The constitution of the new Church was thus democratic and Protestant, but in some respects the German Catholics went even further than the majority of Protestants in a liberal direction, inasmuch as they claimed for all complete religious liberty and declared their religion to be capable of development and modification with the progress of the human mind.

The confession of sins, indulgences, canonization and invocation of saints, use of the Latin language in divine service, prohibition of mixed marriages, the hierarchy of the clergy and the celibacy of the priests were abolished. Nothing was declared either for or against the subject of purgatory.

Czerski was at some of the sittings of the council of Leipzig, but when a formula somewhat similar to that of Breslau had been adopted, he refused his signature because the divinity of Christ had been ignored, and he and his congregation continued to retain by preference the name of "Christian Catholics", which they had originally assumed.

== Beliefs ==
German Catholics adhered to a very simple creed, in which the chief beliefs were:

- God the Father, creator and ruler of the universe.
- Jesus Christ the Saviour, who delivers from the bondage of sin by his life, doctrine and death.
- The operation of the Holy Ghost.
- A holy, universal, Christian church.
- Forgiveness of sins and the life everlasting.

== Politics ==
Many of the German Catholics were involved in politics. Ronge himself was a foremost figure in the troubles of 1848.

In Austria, and ultimately also in Bavaria, the use of the name "German Catholic" was officially prohibited, with that of "dissidents" being substituted, while in Prussia, Baden and Saxony the adherents of the new creed were put under various disabilities, being suspected of both undermining religion and encouraging the revolutionary tendencies of the age.

== Later developments ==
A second council in Leipzig, which met in May 1850, had to be transferred to Köthen on account of the interference of the police. It proposed an alliance with the Free Congregations, which had formed themselves by secession from the Protestant churches, and the election of a joint executive committee from both denominations, which was to act as a presiding board until the meeting of a triennial diet, which was appointed for 1852, but it did not meet. In June 1859, the representatives of the German Catholics and Free Congregations met at Gotha, where a union between the two parties was effected under the name of Bund freireligiöser Gemeinden (Confederation of free religious congregations). It was proposed that the confederation admit all free Protestant and even Jewish congregations.

Legislation in the different states had become more tolerant, and the carrying out of the scheme of the council of Gotha seemed to be at least practicable. But the result proved otherwise. The confederation consisted of too heterogeneous elements. While some of the members receding further and further from orthodoxy proclaimed simple design as their religion and abolished baptism and the Lord's Supper, others on the contrary lost themselves in an exaggerated mysticism.

Many of the congregations which were formed in 1844 and the years immediately following dissolved, including that of Schneidemühl itself, which ceased to exist in 1857. The majority of the German Catholics joined the national Protestant church. As of 1911, there were only about two thousand strict German Catholics, all in Saxony. The movement was superseded by the Old Catholic Church.

== See also ==
- Religion in Germany
- Friends of the Light
