= Nowy Świętów–Sławniowice Nyskie railway =

Railway line in Poland

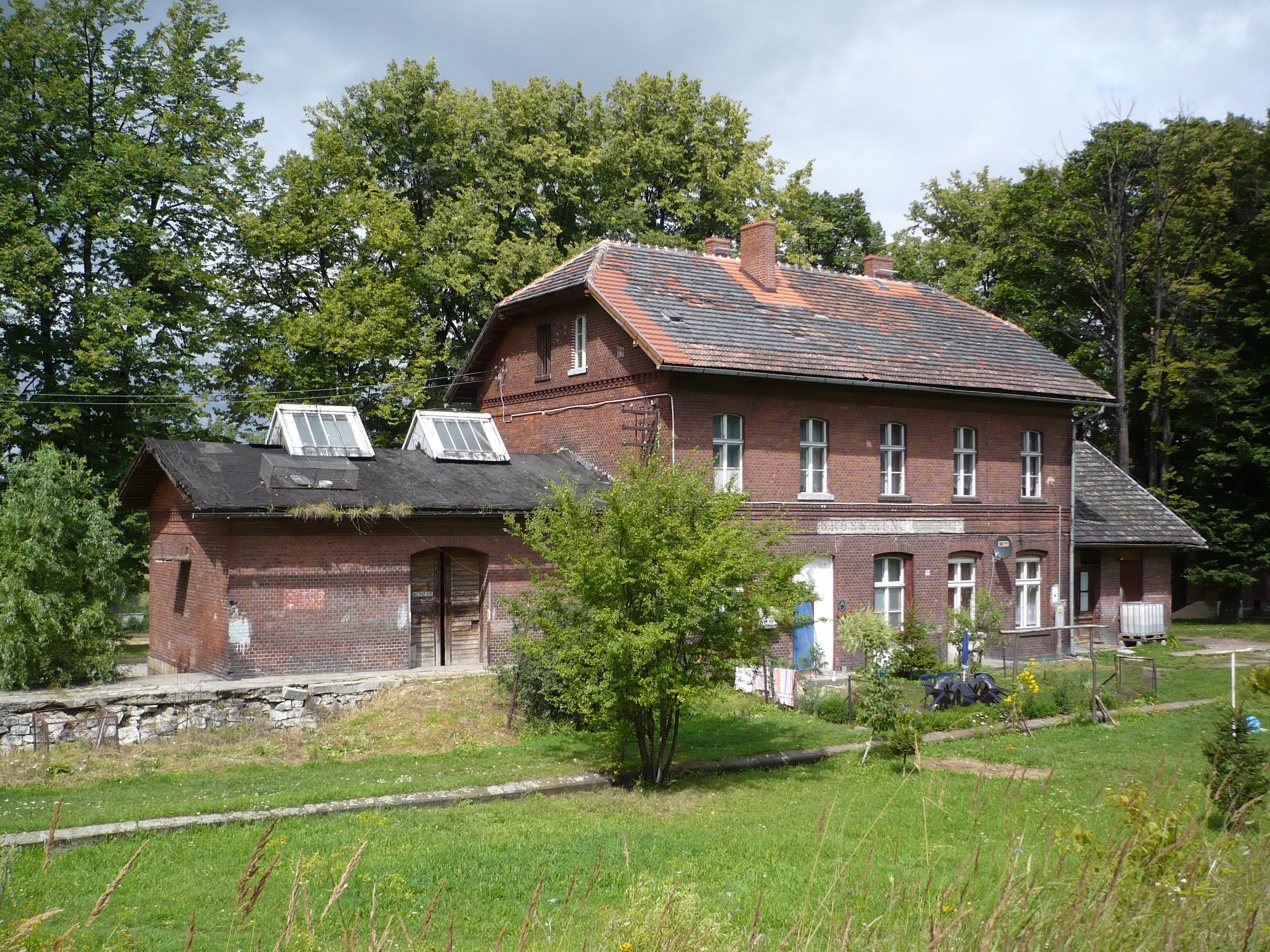
- Sławniowice Nyskie railway station in 2008

Overview
- Status: Defunct
- Owner: KPEV; DR; PKP PLK
- Locale: Poland
- Termini: Nowy Świętów; Sławniowice Nyskie
- Connecting lines: Sudeten Main Line
- Stations: 5

Service
- Type: Heavy rail
- Route number: 332
- Rolling stock: VT 135; DRG Class 64; PKP class OKl2

History
- Opened: 15th November 1894
- Closed: 1984

Technical
- Line length: 12.7 km (7.9 mi)
- Number of tracks: Single track
- Track gauge: 1,435 mm (4 ft 8 1/2 in) standard gauge
- Operating speed: 30 km/h (19 mph)

The Nowy Świętów–Sławniowice Nyskie railway is a defunct 12.7-kilometre (7.9 mi) long branch line in Poland, connecting two villages of Nowy Świętów and Sławniowice. The railway line opened in 1894, passenger traffic ceased in 1961, freight traffic ceased on the Dłużnica - Sławniowice Nyskie part in 1965 and the Nowy Świętów - Dłużnica part was closed in 1984.

The railway used to be numbered 128 according to D29 from 1949, the number changed to 251 in 1971, and changed to the current number 332 in 1985 where its current number is still used after the closure.

== Route ==
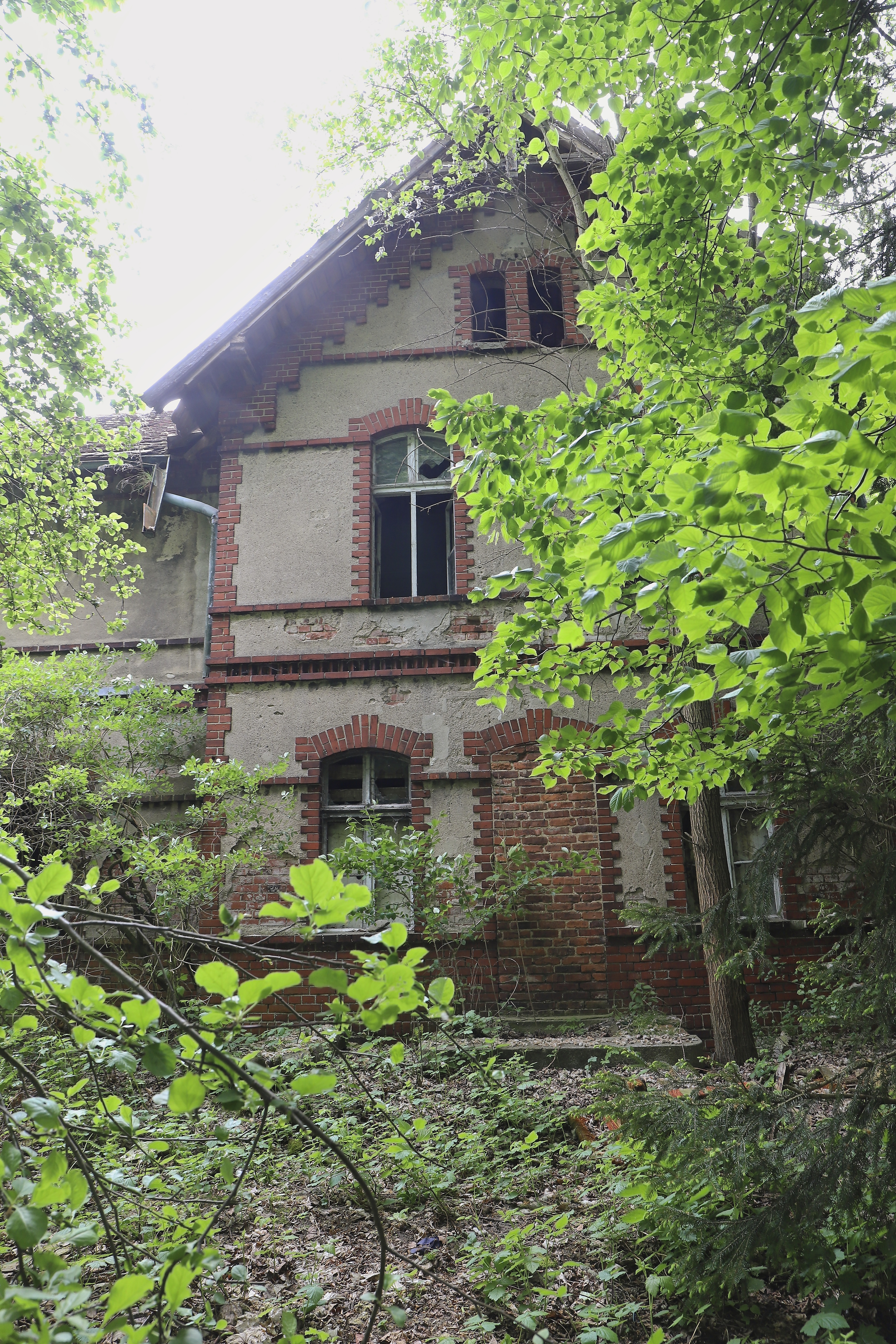
Abandoned Dłużnica station in 2025

The line starts at Nowy Świętów railway station on the Sudeten Main Line, where it heads south south west to Dłużnica, along the way it passes a road bridge and shifts west south west once it reaches Rudawa. The line crosses Biała Głuchołaska river and passes Dłużnica station (3 km of the line) where is in between the rail branches to the paper mill.

The line shifts west north west and crosses the road from Wilamowice Nyskie, upon crossing the road the line heads up north and shifts west south west once it reaches a forest. After shifting west south west the line is branched with Łączki brickworks connected with a single track, the line heads to Biskupów where it heads south south west to Biskupów station (8.2 km of the line).

After passing the station and crossing the road to Gierałcice the line curves south west and back south south west, where it passes Burgrabice station (10.7 km of the line). The line shifts west north west and enters Sławniowice where it heads south south west and stops at Sławniowice railway station, ending the route.

== History ==
Österreichische Lokaleisenbahngesellschaft (ÖLEG) in the concession granted in the construction of the Hannsdorf–Ziegenhals (Hanušovice–Głuchołazy) railway line had a condition stipulated on the construction of a cross-border railway connection in Barzdorf (Bernartice) and Groß Kunzendorf (Velké Kunětice). Funds for the construction were allocated in 1886 and 1892, and the land was transferred for the construction of the railway in March 1889. The construction of the line involved a private capital amounting to a price of 100,000 Goldmarks. The railway was opened on 15 November 1894.

The railway was planned to be extended to Sandhübel (Písečná) for international service, however due small interest from Austrian power and the opening of Neisse–Weidenau (Nysa–Vidnava) and Ottmachau–Heinersdorf (Otmuchów–Dziewiętlice) railway lines, the plan was scrapped. The railway was damaged by the flood next to the paper mill in 1903.

After WW2 the traffic ceased due to damages of the bridge on the Biała Głuchołaska river, where rebuilding the railway resulted in a delay due to unclear political reasons and temptations of the Czechs to occupy the land of Głuchołazy, most of the stations on the railway had German names until 1947. The traffic was reactivated in 1948.

With the increase of road transport (including the increase of PKS bus services), the passenger traffic was ceased on 1 January 1961. The freight traffic was ceased on the Dłużnica - Sławniowice Nyskie part in 1965 with the last freight train departing from Łączki brickworks. The railway was closed in 1984, ceasing freight traffic, and was decided to dismantle the Dłużnica - Sławniowice Nyskie railway part on 1 January 1987, which was eventually dismantled in 1992. The rails from the Nowy Świętów - Dłużnica part were stolen by scrap collectors, in which only 1.3 km of the tracks remained, Rudawa paper mill occupied the railway part for its extension in the 2000s.

== Service ==
=== Passenger ===
The railway saw 3 trains operating each day in summer 1900. the journey between Deutsch Wette (Nowy Świętów) and Groß Kunzendorf (Sławniowice Nyskie) took 42 to 52 minutes.

Summer 1900 timetable
Deutsch Wette - Groß Kunzendorf				Groß Kunzendorf - Deutsch Wette			
Station	1st train	2nd train	3rd train	Station	1st train	2nd train	3rd train
Deutsch Wette	6:40	11:55	19:28	Groß Kunzendorf	5:40	9:50	16:45
Bischofswalde	7:09	12:24	19:57	Bischofswalde	5:59	10:09	17:03
Groß Kunzendorf	7:32	12:47	20:20	Deutsch Wette	6:22	10:34	17:35

The railway saw 5 trains numbered 48a operating between Deutsch Wette and Groß Kunzendorf each day in 1933. With the introduction of the railcars the railway saw 6 trains operating between Deutsch Wette and Groß Kunzendorf each day.

The railway saw 2 trains numbered 167 operating between Nowy Świętów and Sławniowice Nyskie in summer 1960. The last passenger train to Nowy Świętów departed on 30 September 1961.

=== Freight ===
One of the main purpose of the railway was freight transport, the freight traffic was related with servicing the quarry near Sławniowice, brickworks in Łączki and paper mill in Rudawa.

Marble was transported on the railway from the marble quarry near Sławniowice, Sławniowice station used to have an 800-meter narrow gauge railway connecting the quarry, which was used to deliver marble from the quarry to the loading ramp, there used to be a 3.5 km narrow gauge railway leading to the quarry near Jarniołtów.

Bricks were transported on the railway from the brickworks in Łączki via a kilometer long branchline, the direction of the branchline was set to be shifted towards Sławniowice, where trains had to stop next to the branchline and go backwards in order to reach the brickworks.

Wood was transported on the railway to the paper mill in Rudawa and veener paper was also transported from the paper mill. The railway is branched with a paper mill connected with industrial tracks to the production plant and a loading area. The paper mill was the most important freight customer of the railway since 1896, where freight was used until 1984.

== Rolling stock ==
Since the railway opened, Prussian tank locomotives operated on the railway operating both passenger and freight traffic. In the 1930s, German VT 135 diesel railcars with VB 140 trailer wagons from Neisse (Nysa) railway depot operated on the railway, thanks to it the railway saw 6 trains operating each day on the railway. During World War II, the railway used DRG Class 64 locomotives along with 2 passenger wagons. After the war, PKP class OKl2 locomotives operated on the railway.
