= German toponyms (Upper Silesia) =

Toponyms

This is a list of pre-WWII German language place names (toponyms) for the region of Upper Silesia. Upper Silesia today is in the Opole Voivodeship and the Silesian Voivodeship in Poland.

== List ==
Polish name	German name
Biała	Zülz
Bielsko (Note: Now part of Bielsko-Biała.)	Bielitz
Bodzanów	Langendorf
Bytom	Beuthen
Charbielin	Ludwigsdorf
Chorzów	Königshütte
Ciasna	Czieschna
Cieszyn	Teschen
Czechowice-Dziedzice	Tschechowitz-Dzieditz
Dobrodzień	Guttentag
Gliwice	Gleiwitz
Głogówek	Oberglogau
Głubczyce	Leobschütz
Gorzów Śląski	Landsberg
Jaworzno	Jauer
Katowice	Kattowitz
Kędzierzyn-Koźle	Kandrzin-Cosel
Kluczbork	Kreuzburg
Krapkowice	Krappitz
Krzyżanowice	Kreuzenort
Lędziny	Lendzin
Leśnica	Leschnitz
Łaziska Górne	Ober Lazisk
Lubliniec	Lublinitz
Lubomia	Lubom
Miechów	Mechau
Mieszkowice	Dittmannsdorf
Mikołów	Nikolai
Mysłowice	Myslowitz
Nowy Las	Neuwalde
Nowy Świętów	Deutsch Wette
Nysa	Neiße
Olesno	Rosenberg
Opole	Oppeln
Orzesze	Orzesche
Pawłowiczki	Gnadenfeld
Piekary Śląskie	Deutsch Piekar
Pilchowice	Pilchowitz
Polski Świętów	Alt Wette
Prudnik	Neustadt
Pszczyna	Pleß
Pyskowice	Peiskretscham
Racibórz	Ratibor
Racławice Śląskie	Deutsch Rasselwitz
Radzionków	Radzionkau
Ruda Śląska	Ruda
Rudawa	Rothfest
Rudziniec	Rudzinitz
Rybna	Rübenau
Rybnik	Rübnick
Siemianowice Śląskie	Siemianowitz-Laurahütte
Sierakowice	Schierakowitz
Sosnowiec	Sosnowitz
Stary Las	Altewalde
Strzelce Opolskie	Groß Strehlitz
Świętochłowice	Schwientochlowitz
Szybowice	Schnellewalde
Tarnobrzeg	Tarnoberg
Tarnowskie Góry	Tarnowitz
Tworóg	Thorendorf
Tworków	Tworkau
Tychy	Tichau
Wierzbiec	Wackenau
Wilamowice	Wilmesau
Wilamowice Nyskie	Winsdorf
Wodzisław Śląski	Loslau
Zabrze	Hindenburg
Zbrosławice	Dramatal
Zdzieszowice	Deschowitz
Żory	Sohrau

== See also ==
List of German exonyms for places in Poland
