= Zlaté Hory =

- Town
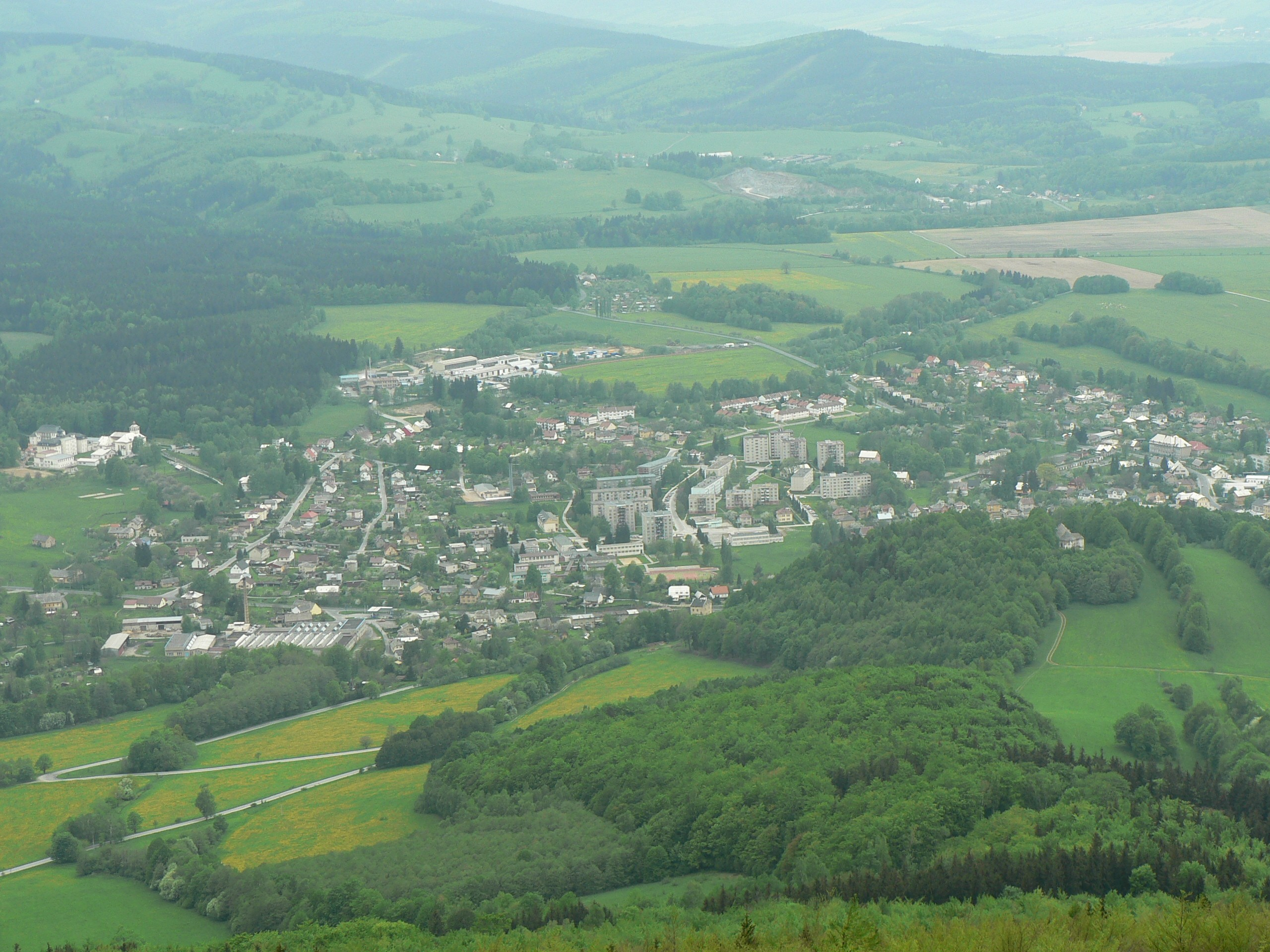
- View of the town from Biskupská kupa

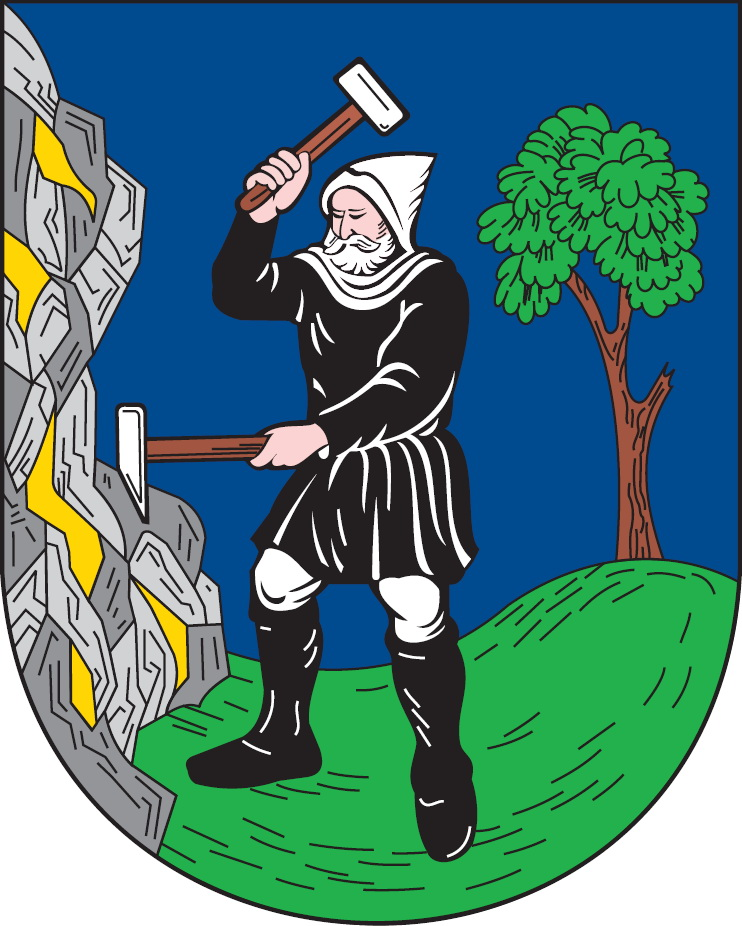
- Flag Coat of arms

- Location in the Czech Republic
- Coordinates: 50°15′17″N 17°23′38″E
- Country: Czech Republic
- Region: Olomouc
- District: Jeseník
- First mentioned: 1263

Government
  - Mayor: Milan Rác

Area
  - Total: 85.93 km^{2} (33.18 sq mi)
- Elevation: 390 m (1,280 ft)

Population (2026-01-01)
  - Total: 3,933
  - Density: 45.77/km^{2} (118.5/sq mi)
- Time zone: UTC+1 (CET)
  - Summer (DST): UTC+2 (CEST)
- Postal code: 739 76
- Website: zlatehory.cz

Zlaté Hory (Czech pronunciation: [ˈzlatɛː ˈɦorɪ]; until 1948 Cukmantl; German: Zuckmantel) is a town in Jeseník District in the Olomouc Region of the Czech Republic. It has about 3,900 inhabitants. The town lies in the Zlatohorská Highlands on the border with Poland.

The early history Zlaté Hory was associated with gold mining, and there are still gold reserves in the ground today. The historic town centre is well preserved and is protected as an urban monument zone.

== Administrative division ==
Zlaté Hory consists of seven municipal parts (in brackets population according to the 2021 census):

- Zlaté Hory (2,984)
- Dolní Údolí (33)
- Horní Údolí (12)
- Ondřejovice (243)
- Rejvíz (81)
- Rožmitál (33)
- Salisov (27)

== Etymology ==
The name Zlaté Hory literally means 'golden mountains' in Czech.

== Geography ==
Zlaté Hory is located about 14 kilometres (9 mi) east of Jeseník and 74 km (46 mi) north of Olomouc, on the border with Poland. It is located in the historical region of Czech Silesia. It lies in the Zlatohorská Highlands, which gave it its modern name. The southernmost part extends to the Hrubý Jeseník mountain range. In this part is also located Orlík – the highest peak of the municipal territory at 1,204 m (3,950 ft) above sea level.

Several small watercourses flows through the municipal territory. The stream Zlatý potok flows through the town proper. The area is rich in springs.

The western part of the municipal territory lies in the Jeseníky Protected Landscape Area. This area is known for the Rejvíz National Nature Reserve. The reserve has an area of 328.6 ha (812 acres) and is known for peat bogs and associated fauna and flora.

== History ==
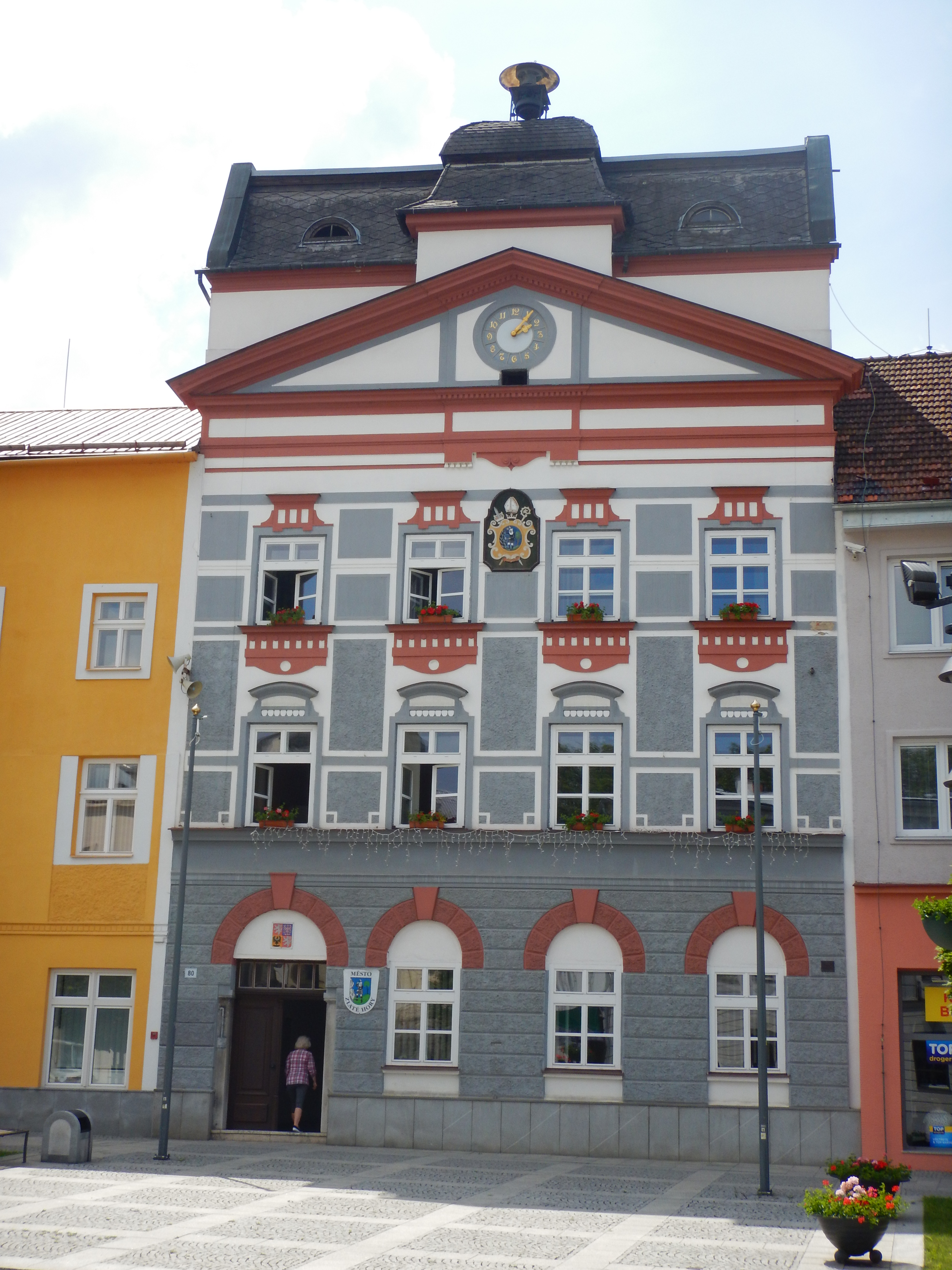
Town hall

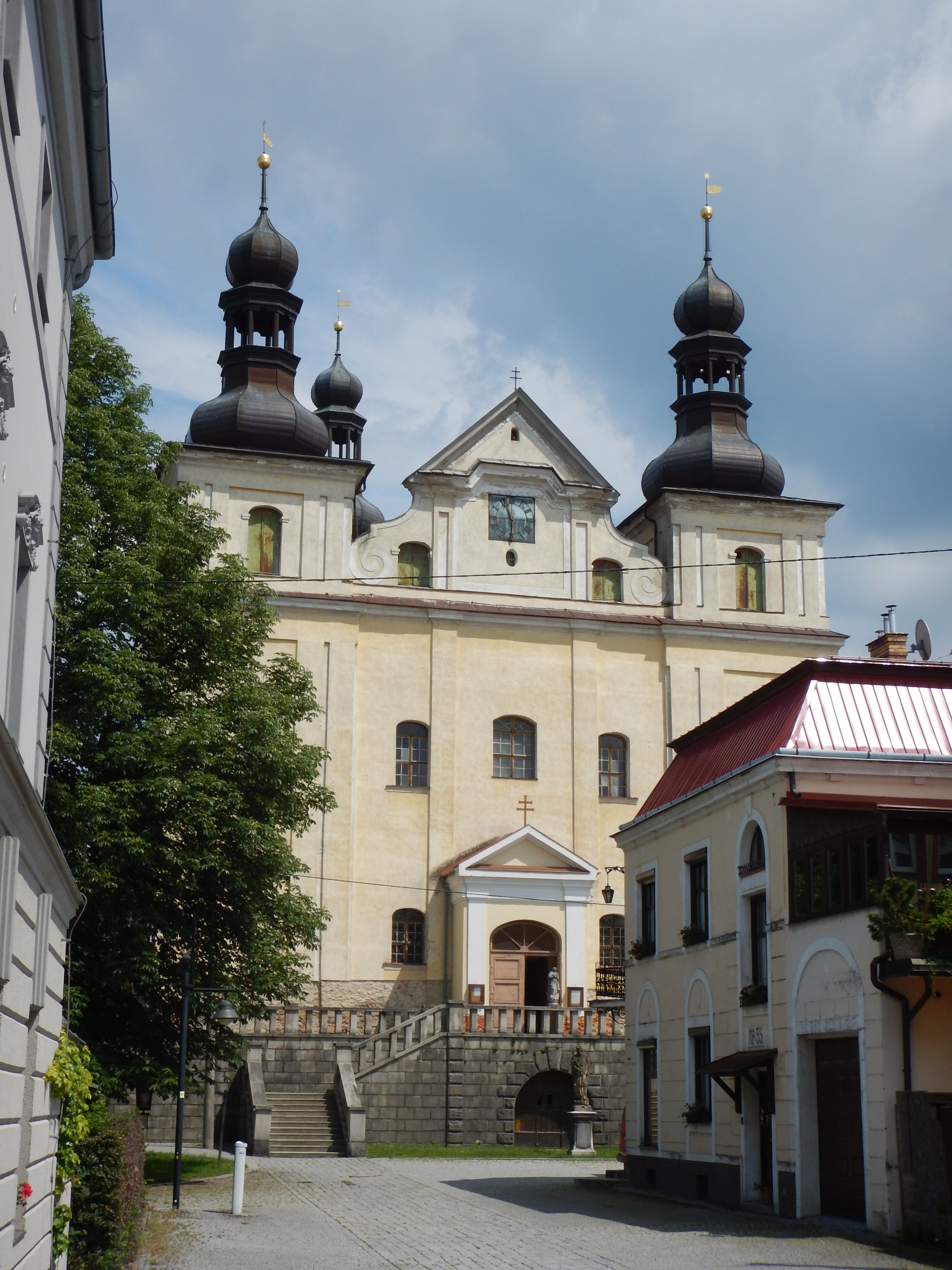
Church of the Assumption of the Virgin Mary

Golden mines in the Zlaté Hory area were first mentioned in a document from 1224. Edelštejn Castle was founded near the gold mines for their protection. Zlaté Hory (under its old name Cukmantl) was first mentioned in 1263. The area with the gold mines was very attractive and in the 13th century the Přemyslid dukes and the bishops of Wrocław competed for it. In 1306, the settlement was promoted to a town by its then owner, Duke Nicholas I. As in other Silesian towns such as Löwenberg, Goldberg and Freudenthal, German miners were called into the region.

Until the mid-15th century, the town was ruled the Opavian dukes except for the period between 1361 and 1367, when it was owned by King John of Bohemia. In 1440, the town was bought by Bolko V the Hussite, who had repaired the Edelštejn Castle and granted the town Magdeburg rights. King George of Poděbrady acquired the town from Bolko's brother Nicholas I of Opole in 1465. Two years later, Edelštejn Castle was attacked and destroyed by Jošt of Rožmberk and after the conclusion of the agreement, Zlaté Hory passed under the rule of the bishops of Wrocław for the following centuries. The town was included within the ecclesiastical Duchy of Nysa, under suzerainty of the Bohemian Crown.

During the Thirty Years' War, the town was repeatedly looted by the Swedish troops. In the second half of the 17th century, the town was at the centre of the infamous Northern Moravia witch trials, during which 54 women were burned. Despite these events, the town experienced economic growth, and linen began to develop.

Within the War of the Bavarian Succession, the place saw the Battle of Zuckmantel on 14 January 1779, in which the Austrian detachment hammered the larger Prussian force.

According to the Austrian census of 1910, the town had 4,520 inhabitants and all of them were German-speaking. Most populous religious group were Roman Catholics with 4,441 (98.3%). Following World War I, it was part of Czechoslovakia.

During World War II, the German occupiers operated four forced labour subcamps of the Stalag VIII-B/344 prisoner-of-war camp in the town. On 29 January 1945, German SS soldiers were conducting a death march in the area and murdered 138 prisoners on a road from Konradów.

After World War II, the German-speaking population was expelled.

== Demographics ==
Historical population

Year	Pop.	±%
1869	8,021	—
1880	8,124	+1.3%
1890	8,108	−0.2%
1900	7,767	−4.2%
1910	7,604	−2.1%

Year	Pop.	±%
1921	6,861	−9.8%
1930	7,471	+8.9%
1950	3,287	−56.0%
1961	3,879	+18.0%
1970	4,362	+12.5%

Year	Pop.	±%
1980	4,556	+4.4%
1991	4,550	−0.1%
2001	4,507	−0.9%
2011	3,762	−16.5%
2021	3,413	−9.3%

Source: Censuses

== Economy ==
The largest employer based in the town is CS-CONT, a manufacturer of containers with more than 500 employees.

Modern mining of non-ferrous metal ores, gold and silver was terminated in 1993. In 2019, a geological survey was launched to find out how much gold is still in the deposits and whether reserves of other metals such as copper, zinc and lead are present. Based on the results of the survey and other factors, mining activity may be resumed.

== Transport ==
Zlaté Hory is connected with Mikulovice by a short railway line of local importance. Trains run on it only on weekends and holidays.

== Sights ==
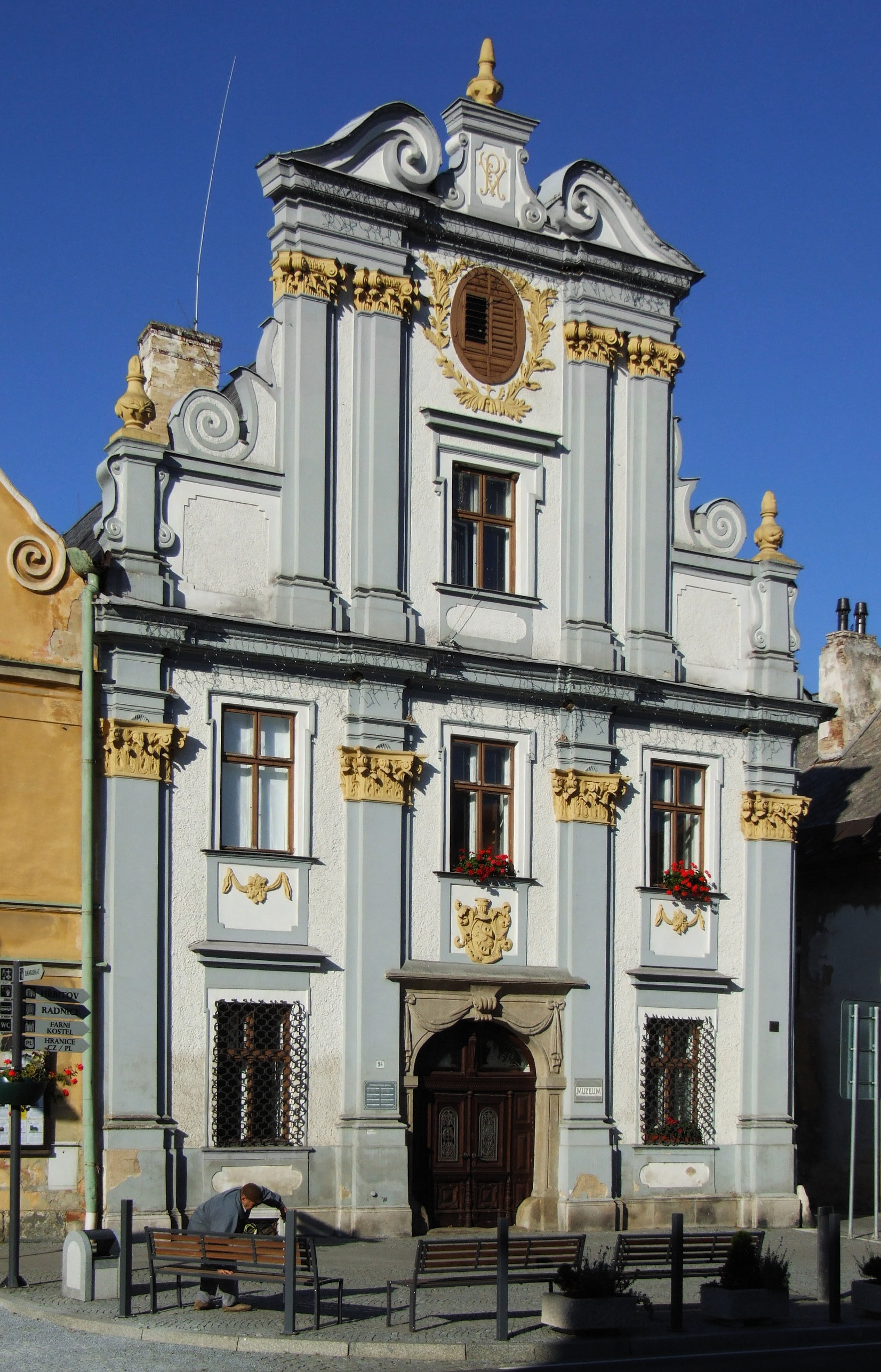
Old Post, today the town museum

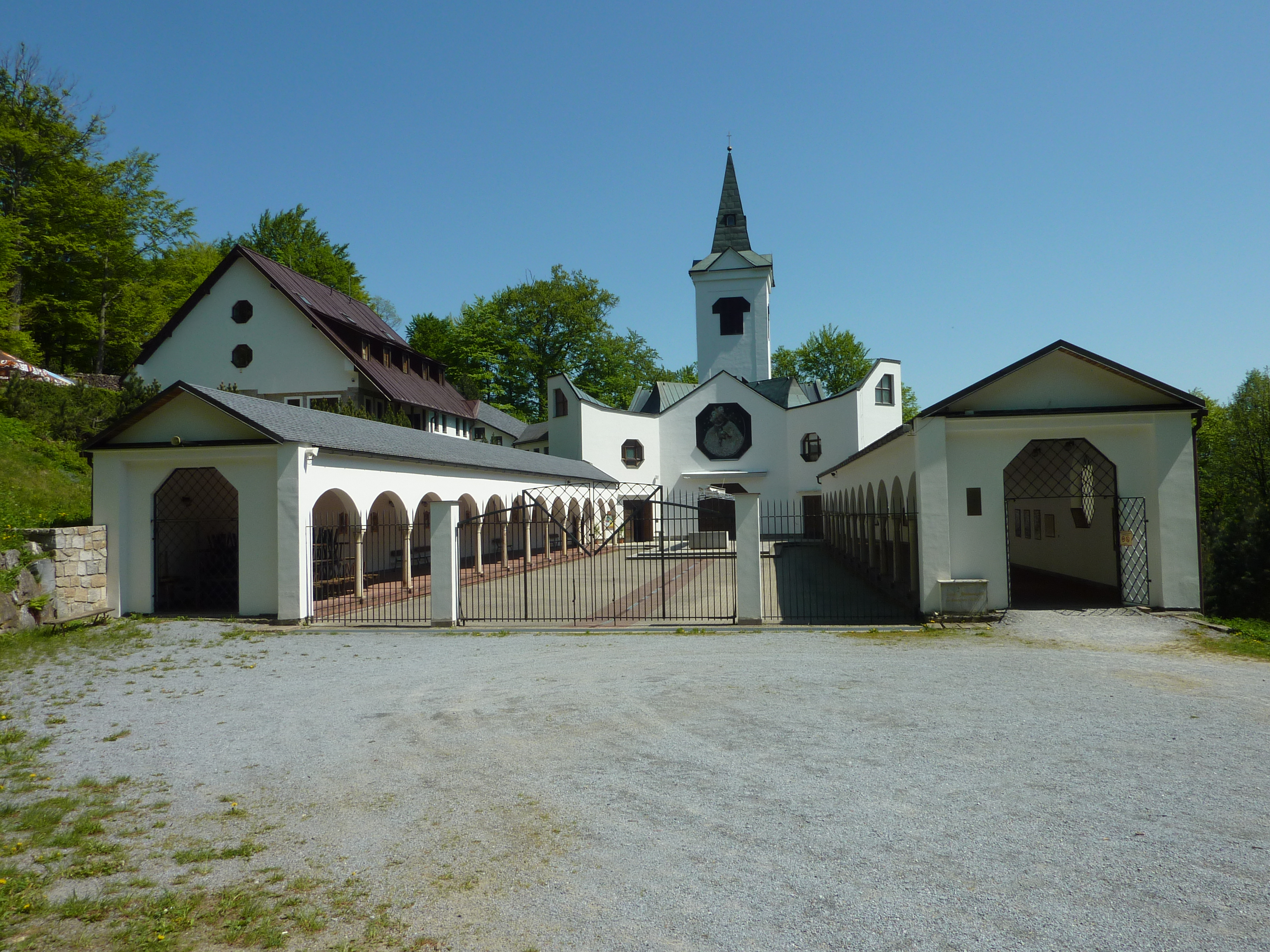
Church of Mary Help of Christians

The historic town centre is formed by the square Náměstí Svobody and its surroundings. Houses in the centre usually have an older Renaissance or Baroque core with an Empire reconstruction of the façade from the early 19th century. The main landmarks of the town square are the town hall and the Old Post building. Old Post dates from 1698 and has richly decorated façade with Corinthian columns. Today it houses the Town Museum, which is focused on the mining tradition of the area and the 17th-century witch trials. In front of the town hall stands a Baroque statue of Saint Joseph from 1731.

There are three churches in Zlaté Hory and several smaller sacral monuments. In the town centre are located the Church of the Assumption of the Virgin Mary and the Church of the Holy Cross. The pilgrimage Church of Mary Help of Christians is situated in the hills south from the town. The Church of the Assumption of the Virgin Mary is the main landmark of the town. The originally early Gothic structure was rebuilt to its current Baroque form after a fire in 1699. The Church of the Holy Cross was built in the Baroque style in 1764–1768. Today its chamber environment serves mainly cultural purposes.

Ruins of the castles Edelštejn, Koberštejn and Leuchtenštejn are located in the hills around the town. However, only little of them has survived to this day. Edelštejn and Koberštejn are protected as cultural monuments.

The old mining galleries are also protected as cultural monuments. Some of them are open to the public.

The 18 metres (59 ft) high stone observation tower on the mountain Biskupská kupa, which has an elevation of 890 metres (2,920 ft), is the oldest observation tower in the Eastern Sudetes. It was built in 1898 on the occasion of 50 years of the reign of Emperor Franz Joseph I.

== Notable people ==
- Jindřich František Boblig of Edelstadt (1612–1698), inquisitor
- Victor Franke (1865–1936), German general
- Kurt Knispel (1921–1945), German tank commander
- Werner Ruzicka (born 1943), German boxer

== Twin towns – sister cities ==
Zlaté Hory is twinned with:

- Głuchołazy, Poland
- Kętrzyn, Poland
- Vodňany, Czech Republic

Zlaté Hory also cooperates with Prague 1 and Mikulovice in the Czech Republic.
