= Pokrzywna, Opole Voivodeship =

Pokrzywna
- Village
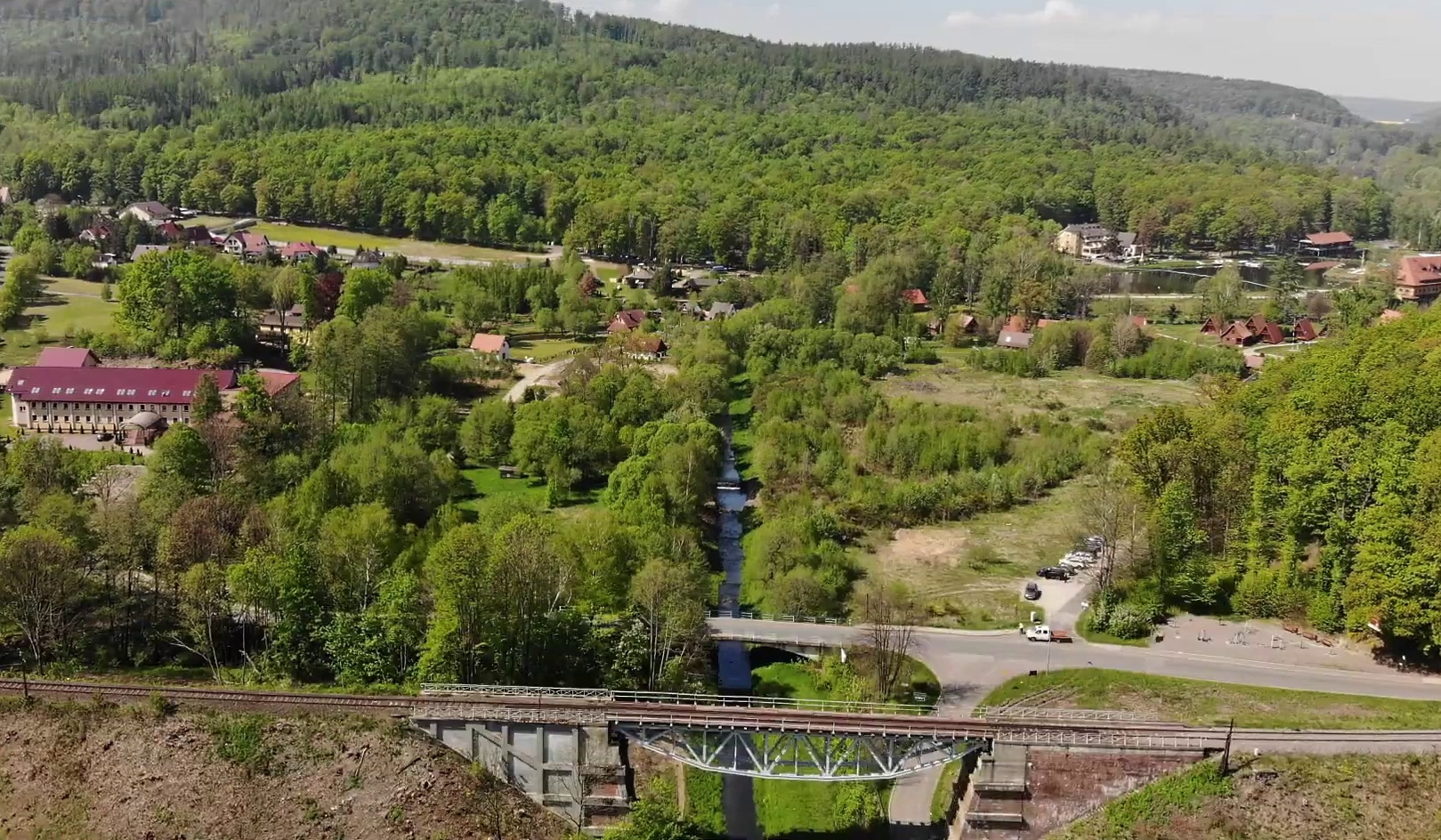
- Eastern part of Pokrzywna

- Location within Poland
- Coordinates: 50°17′14″N 17°27′9″E
- Country: Poland
- Voivodeship: Opole
- County: Nysa
- Gmina: Głuchołazy
- Highest elevation: 350 m (1,150 ft)
- Lowest elevation: 340 m (1,120 ft)
- Population: 210

Pokrzywna [pɔˈkʂɨvna] (German: Wildgrund) is a village in the administrative district of Gmina Głuchołazy, within Nysa County, Opole Voivodeship, in south-western Poland. It is situated in the historical region of Prudnik Land. It lies approximately 8 km (5 mi) south-east of Głuchołazy, 10 km (6 mi) south-west of Prudnik, and 29 km (18 mi) south of Nysa.

As of 31 December 2021, the village's population numbered 267 inhabitants.

== Geography ==
The village is located in the southern part of Opole Voivodeship, close to the Czech Republic–Poland border. It is situated in the historical Prudnik Land region, as well as in Upper Silesia. It lies in the Opawskie Mountains, in the valley of Złoty Potok river. It sits in close proximity to the mountains of Olszak, Szyndzielowa Kopa, and Zamkowa Kopa.
