= Markowice, Opole Voivodeship =

Markowice
- Village
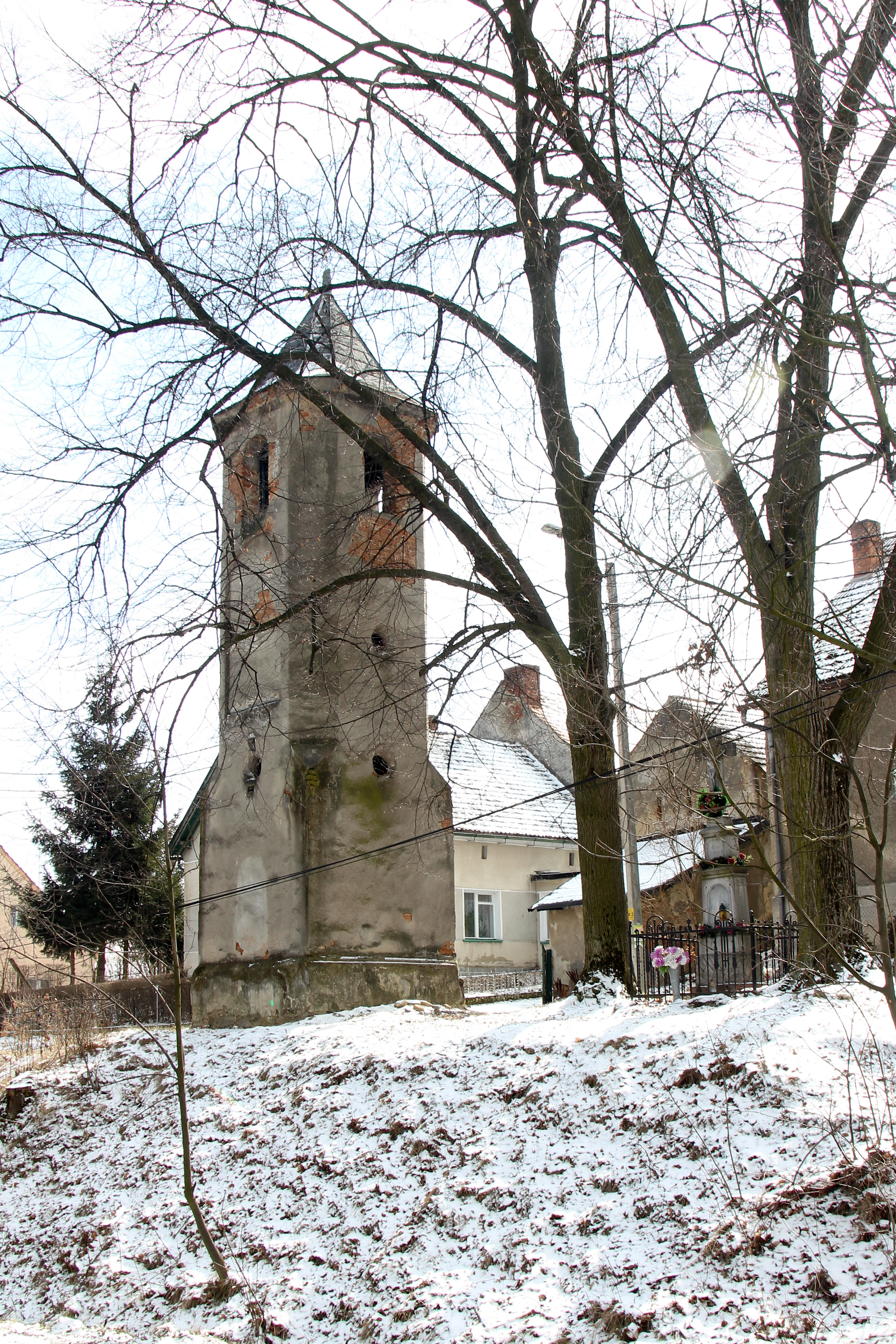
- Bell tower

- Location within Poland
- Coordinates: 50°23′22″N 17°19′44″E
- Country: Poland
- Voivodeship: Opole
- County: Nysa
- Gmina: Głuchołazy
- Population: 210

Markowice [markɔˈvit͡sɛ] (German: Markersdorf) is a village in the administrative district of Gmina Głuchołazy, within Nysa County, Opole Voivodeship, in south-western Poland, close to the Czech border.
