= Kletnik =

- Village
- Location within Poland
- Coordinates: 50°18′27″N 17°23′47″E
- Country: Poland
- Voivodeship: Opole
- County: Nysa
- Gmina: Głuchołazy
- Time zone: UTC+1 (CET)
  - Summer (DST): UTC+2
- Postal code: 48-340
- Area code: +4877
- Vehicle registration: ONY

Kletnik is a village in the administrative district of Gmina Głuchołazy, within Nysa County, Opole Voivodeship, south-western Poland.
