= Podlesie, Nysa County =

Podlesie
- Village
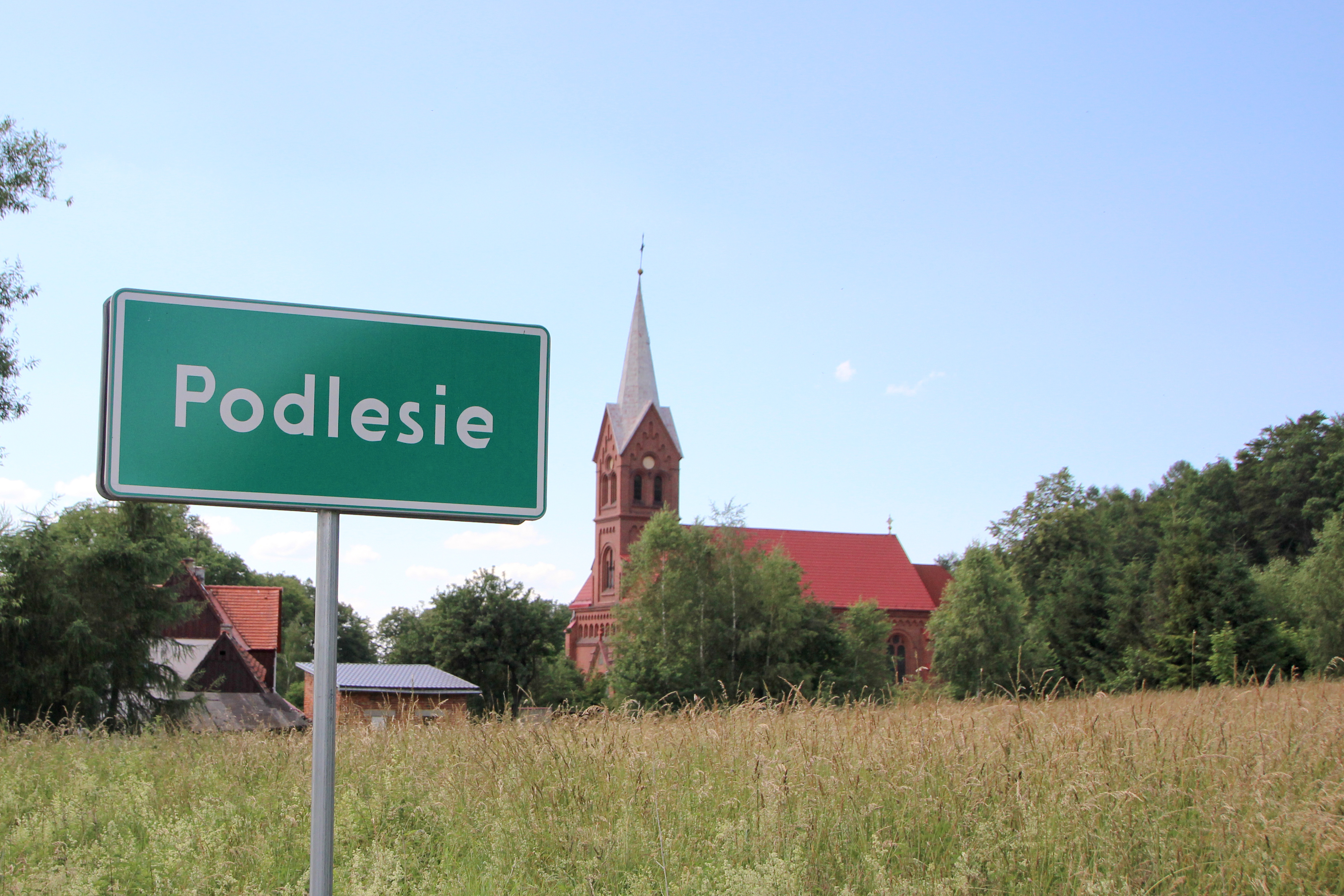

- Location within Poland
- Coordinates: 50°16′56″N 17°20′58″E
- Country: Poland
- Voivodeship: Opole
- County: Nysa
- Gmina: Głuchołazy
- Highest elevation: 475 m (1,558 ft)
- Lowest elevation: 355 m (1,165 ft)
- Population: 310

Podlesie [pɔdˈlɛɕɛ] (German: Schönwalde) is a village in the administrative district of Gmina Głuchołazy, within Nysa County, Opole Voivodeship, in south-western Poland, close to the Czech border.
