= Sucha Kamienica =

- Village
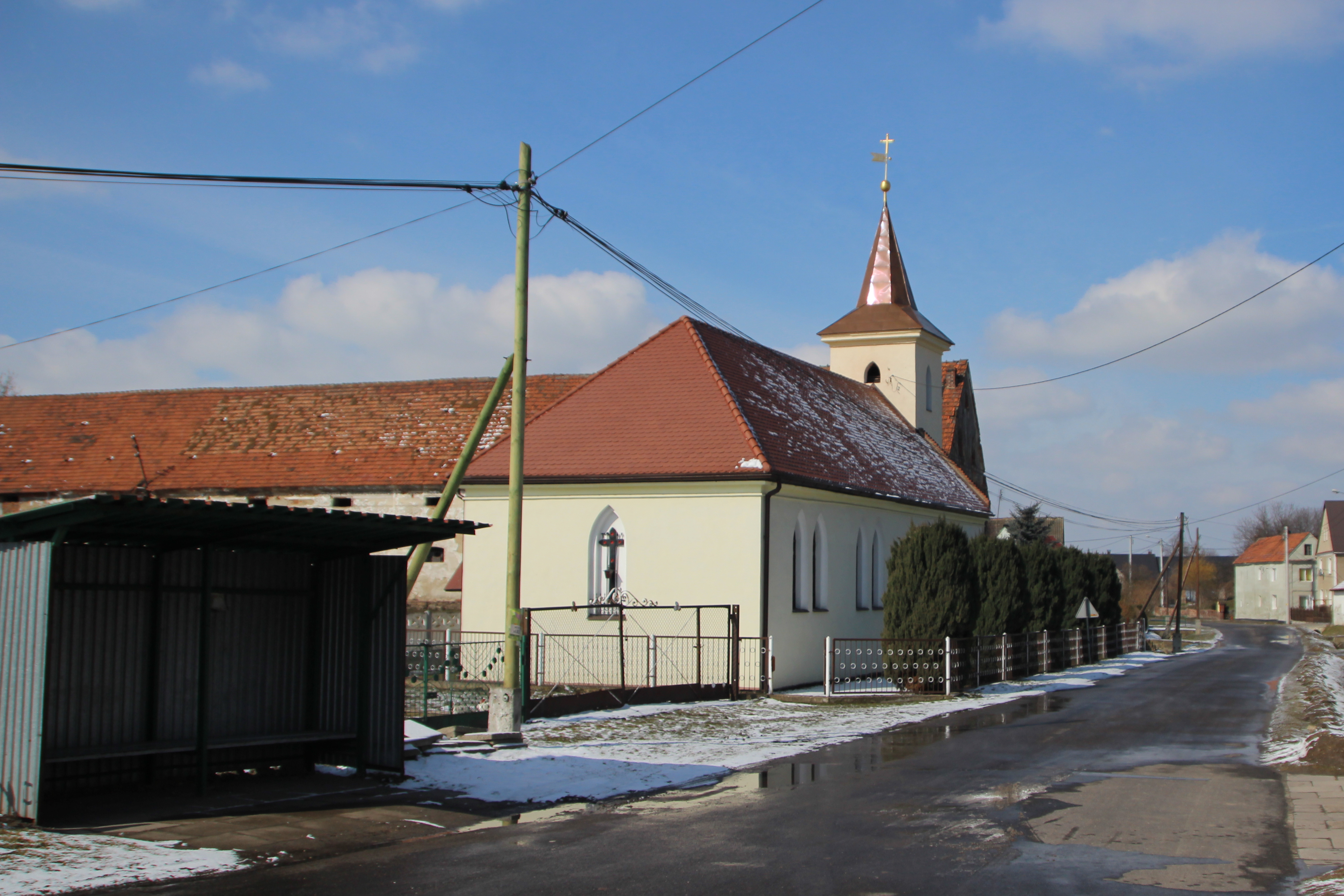
- Church

- Location within Poland
- Coordinates: 50°23′N 17°22′E
- Country: Poland
- Voivodeship: Opole
- County: Nysa
- Gmina: Głuchołazy
- Population: 200

Sucha Kamienica [ˈsuxa kamjɛˈnit͡sa] (German: Dürrkamitz) is a village in the administrative district of Gmina Głuchołazy, within Nysa County, Opole Voivodeship, in south-western Poland, close to the Czech border.
