= Skowronków =

- Village
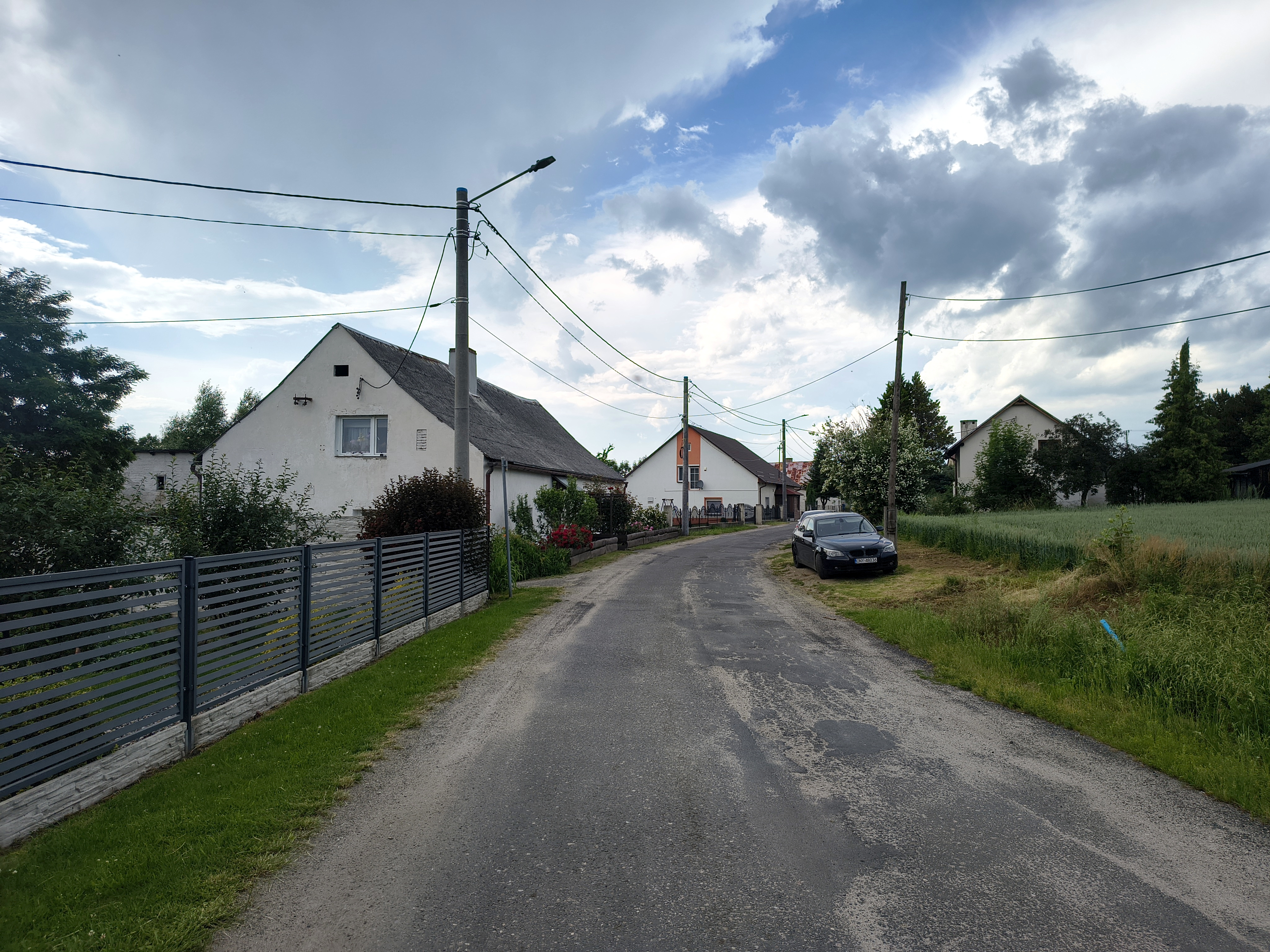

- Location within Poland
- Coordinates: 50°17′N 17°24′E
- Country: Poland
- Voivodeship: Opole
- County: Nysa
- Gmina: Głuchołazy
- Elevation: 335 m (1,099 ft)

Skowronków [skɔˈvrɔnkuf] (German: Lerchenfeld) is a village in the administrative district of Gmina Głuchołazy, within Nysa County, Opole Voivodeship, in south-western Poland, close to the Czech border.

Before 1958 it was a part of Czechoslovakia. The village became a part of Poland as a result of a minor land exchange with Czechoslovakia.
