= Bolkowice, Opole Voivodeship =

Bolkowice
- Village
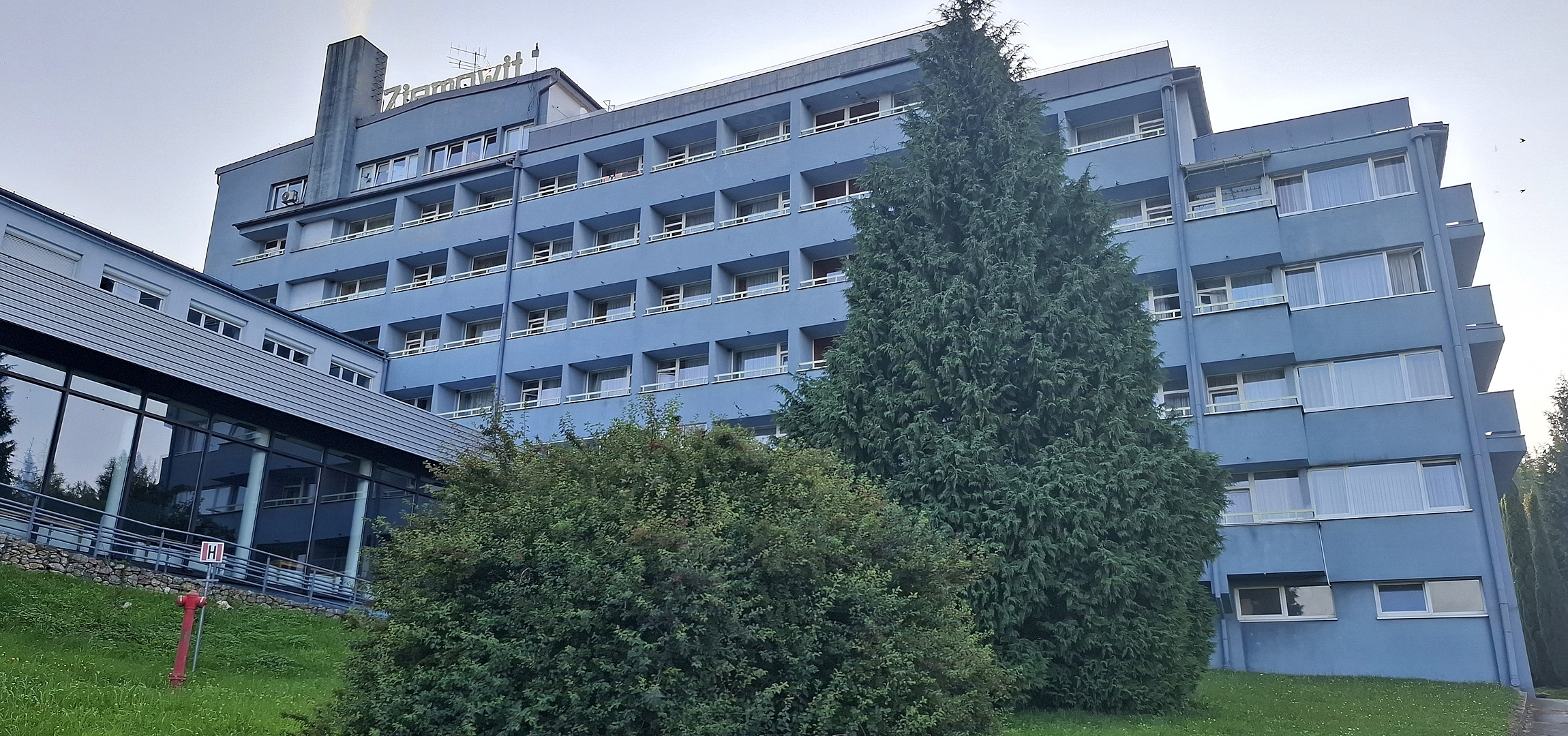

- Location within Poland
- Coordinates: 50°16′44″N 17°26′14″E
- Country: Poland
- Voivodeship: Opole
- County: Nysa
- Gmina: Głuchołazy
- Time zone: UTC+1 (CET)
  - Summer (DST): UTC+2
- Area code: +4877
- Vehicle registration: ONY

Bolkowice is a village in the administrative district of Gmina Głuchołazy, within Nysa County, Opole Voivodeship, south-western Poland.
