= Konradów, Opole Voivodeship =

Konradów
- Village
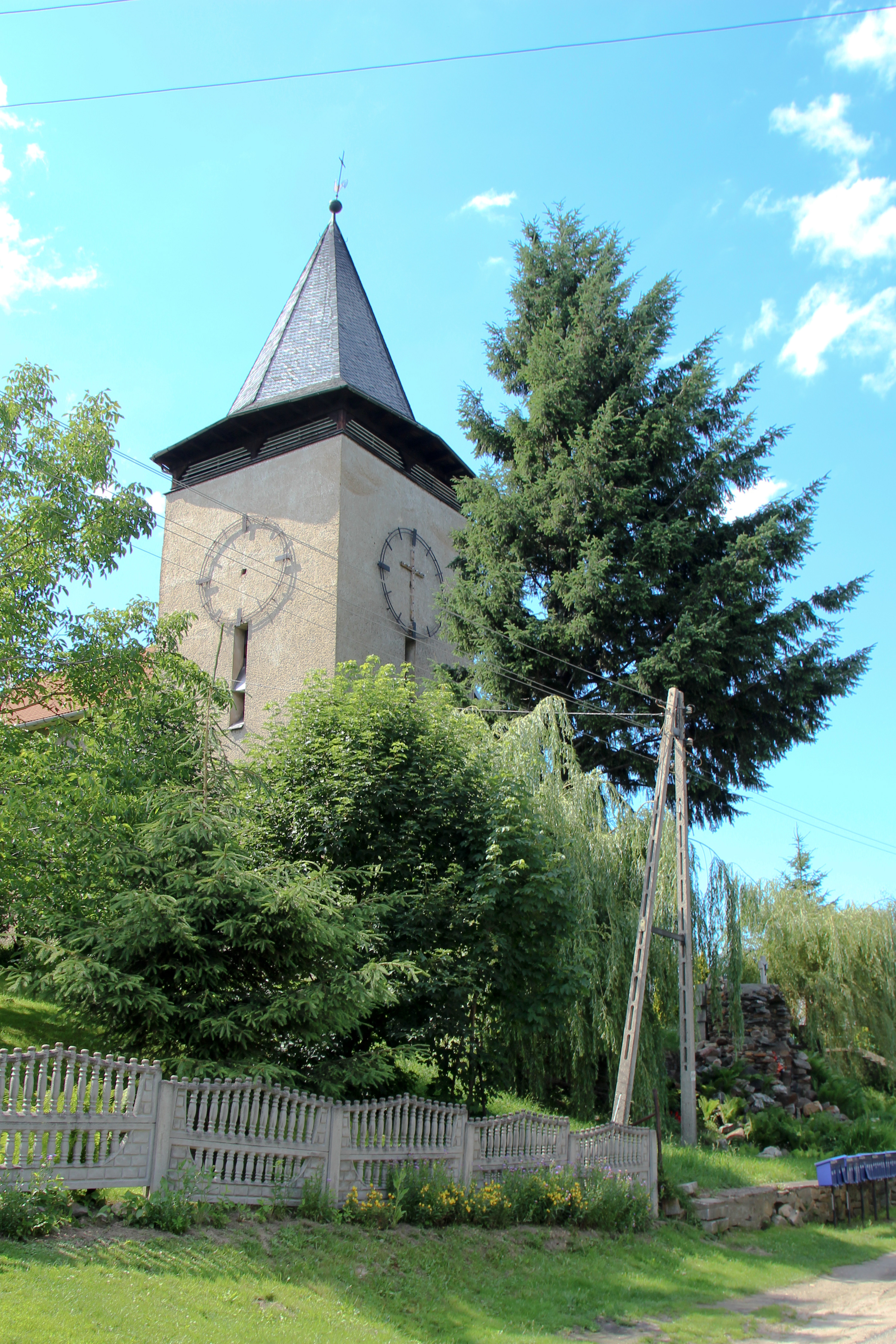

- Location within Poland
- Coordinates: 50°17′45″N 17°24′6″E
- Country: Poland
- Voivodeship: Opole
- County: Nysa
- Gmina: Głuchołazy
- Highest elevation: 400 m (1,300 ft)
- Lowest elevation: 320 m (1,050 ft)
- Population: 880

Konradów [kɔnˈraduf] (German: Dürr Kunzendorf) is a village in the administrative district of Gmina Głuchołazy, within Nysa County, Opole Voivodeship, in south-western Poland, close to the Czech border.

On 29 January 1945, German SS officers were conducting a death march in the area and murdered 138 prisoners on a road leading to Zlaté Hory.
