= Stara Leśniczówka =

- Village
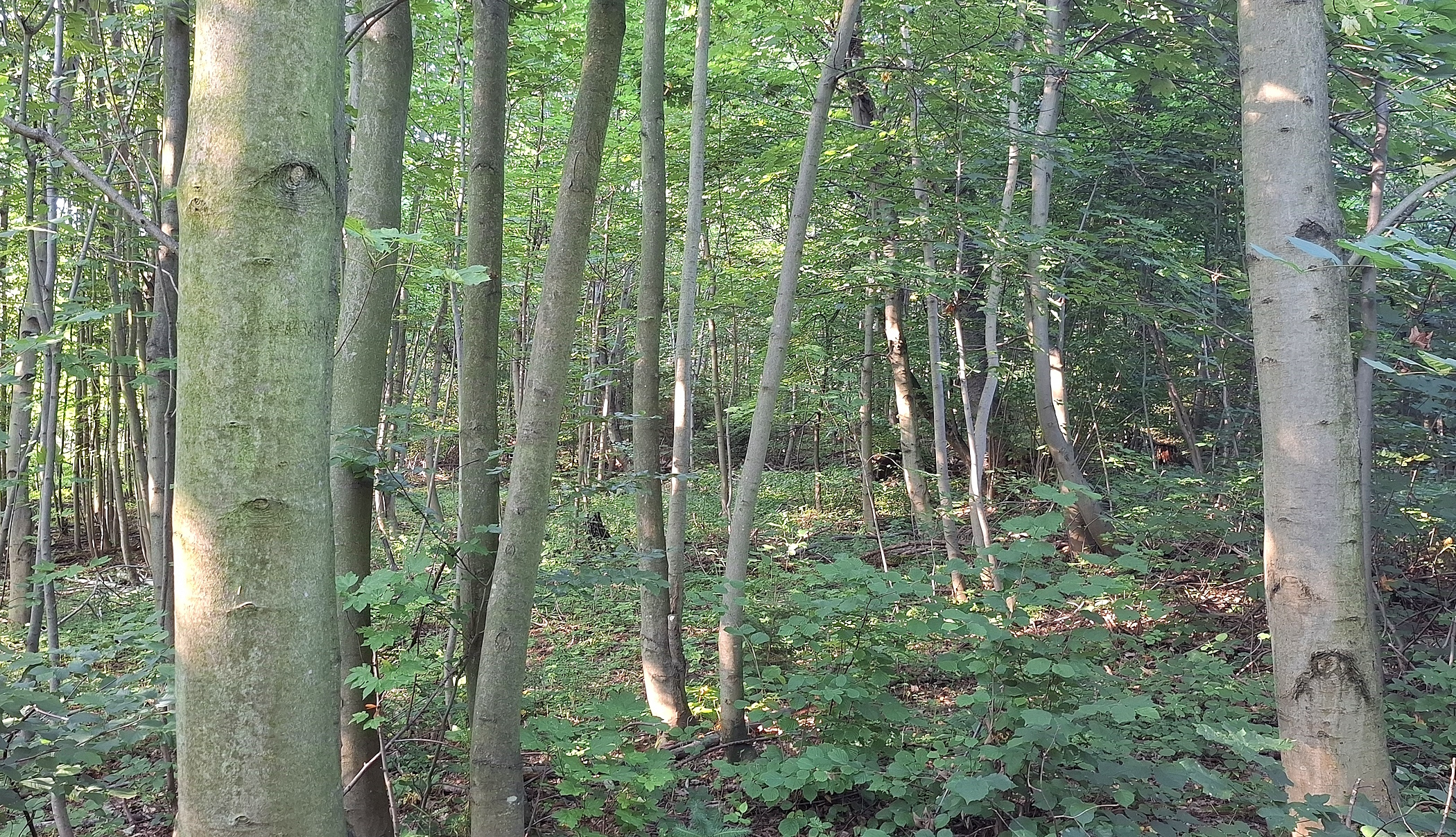

- Location within Poland
- Coordinates: 50°16′23″N 17°26′49″E
- Country: Poland
- Voivodeship: Opole
- County: Nysa
- Gmina: Głuchołazy
- Time zone: UTC+1 (CET)
  - Summer (DST): UTC+2
- Area code: +4877
- Vehicle registration: ONY

Stara Leśniczówka is a village in the administrative district of Gmina Głuchołazy, within Nysa County, Opole Voivodeship, south-western Poland. The village is uninhabited.
