= Gierałcice, Nysa County =

Gierałcice
- Village
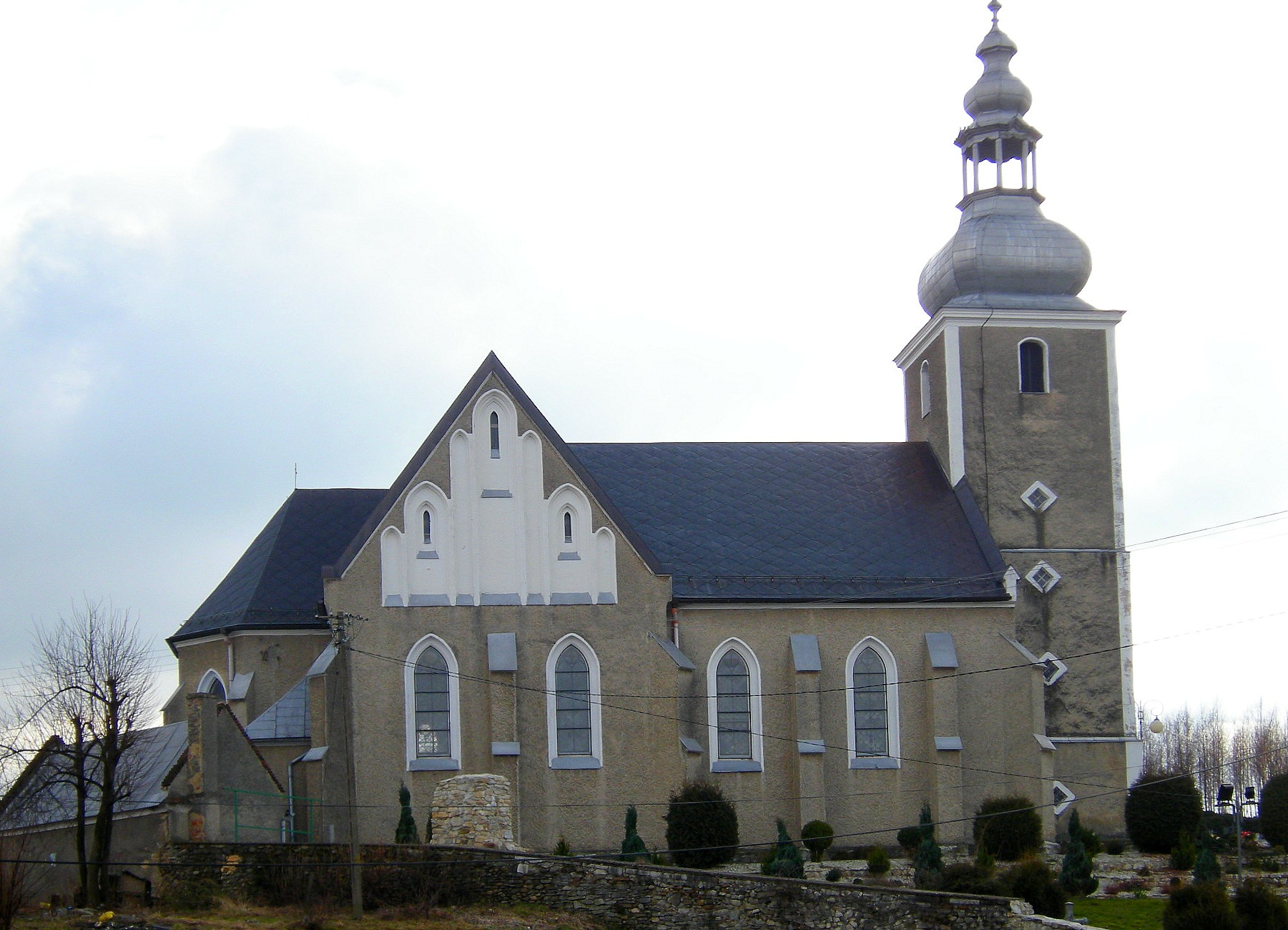
- Catholic church

- Location within Poland
- Coordinates: 50°20′23″N 17°19′9″E
- Country: Poland
- Voivodeship: Opole
- County: Nysa
- Gmina: Głuchołazy
- Population (approx.): 910

Gierałcice [ɡʲɛrau̯ˈt͡ɕit͡sɛ] (German: Giersdorf) is a village in the administrative district of Gmina Głuchołazy, within Nysa County, Opole Voivodeship, in south-western Poland, close to the Czech border. It lies approximately 5 km (3 mi) north-west of Głuchołazy, 16 km (10 mi) south of Nysa, and 18 km (11 mi) north-west of Prudnik.
