= Polski Świętów =

- Village
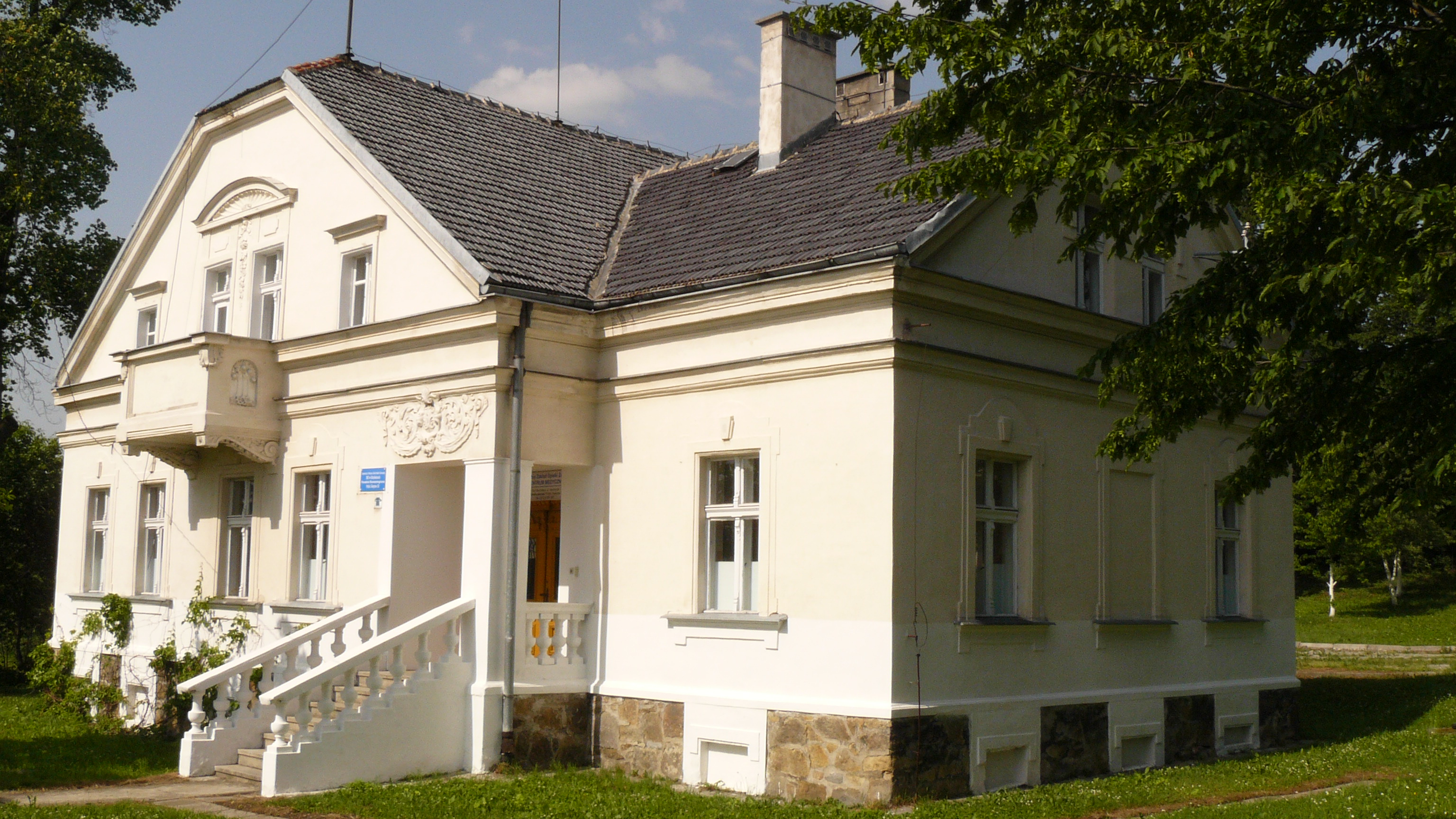
- Health clinic

- Location within Poland
- Coordinates: 50°23′13″N 17°20′59″E
- Country: Poland
- Voivodeship: Opole
- County: Nysa
- Gmina: Głuchołazy
- Highest elevation: 252 m (827 ft)
- Lowest elevation: 250 m (820 ft)

Population
  - Total: 420
- Time zone: UTC+1 (CET)
  - Summer (DST): UTC+2 (CEST)
- Vehicle registration: ONY

Polski Świętów (Polish: [ˈpɔlskʲi ˈɕfjɛntuf], German: Polnisch Wette) is a village in the administrative district of Gmina Głuchołazy, within Nysa County, Opole Voivodeship, in southern Poland, close to the Czech border. It lies approximately 9 km (6 mi) north of Głuchołazy, and 12 km (7 mi) south of Nysa.

22 Polish citizens were murdered by Nazi Germany in the village during World War II.
