= Velké Kunětice =

- Municipality
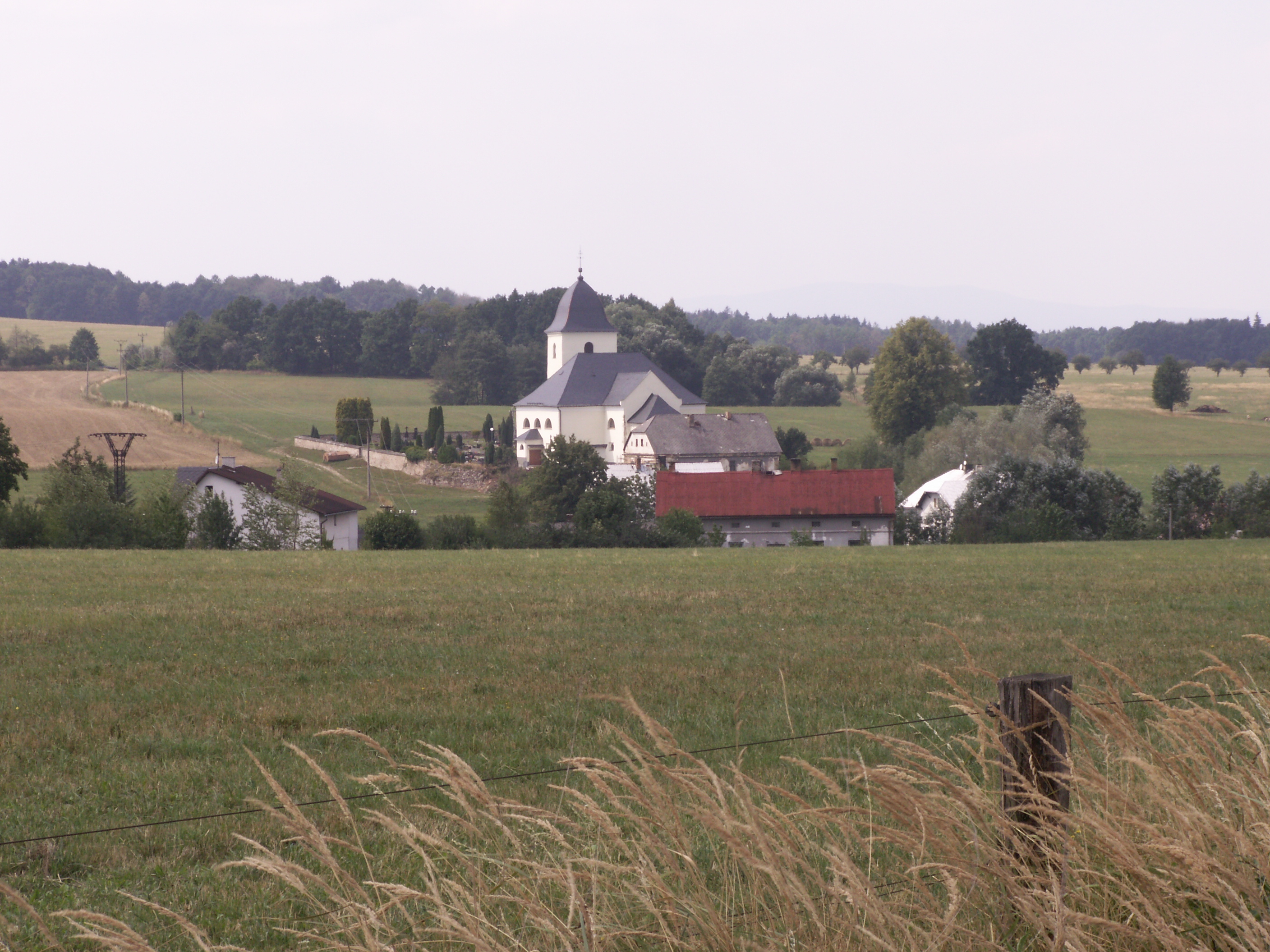
- General view

- Flag Coat of arms

- Location in the Czech Republic
- Coordinates: 50°19′0″N 17°15′58″E
- Country: Czech Republic
- Region: Olomouc
- District: Jeseník
- First mentioned: 1284

Area
  - Total: 9.83 km^{2} (3.80 sq mi)
- Elevation: 340 m (1,120 ft)

Population (2026-01-01)
  - Total: 511
  - Density: 52.0/km^{2} (135/sq mi)
- Time zone: UTC+1 (CET)
  - Summer (DST): UTC+2 (CEST)
- Postal code: 790 52
- Website: www.velkekunetice.cz

Velké Kunětice (German: Groß Kunzendorf) is a municipality and village in Jeseník District in the Olomouc Region of the Czech Republic. It has about 500 inhabitants.

== Geography ==
Velké Kunětice is located about 10 kilometres (6 mi) northeast of Jeseník and 80 km (50 mi) north of Olomouc, on the border with Poland. It lies in the Zlatohorská Highlands. The highest point is the hill Kamenný vrch at 459 m (1,506 ft) above sea level.

== History ==
The first written mention of Velké Kunětice is from 1284, when it was owned by the Bishopric in Wrocław. At the end of the 15th century, there were limestone quarries and iron ore was probably mined in the area.

From 1938 to 1945, it was occupied by Germany. During World War II, the Germans operated the E114 forced labour subcamp of the Stalag VIII-B/344 prisoner-of-war camp at the local stone quarry and factory.

== Demographics ==
Historical population

Year	Pop.	±%
1869	1,181	—
1880	1,307	+10.7%
1890	1,282	−1.9%
1900	1,344	+4.8%
1910	1,421	+5.7%

Year	Pop.	±%
1921	1,293	−9.0%
1930	1,448	+12.0%
1950	635	−56.1%
1961	639	+0.6%
1970	655	+2.5%

Year	Pop.	±%
1980	609	−7.0%
1991	574	−5.7%
2001	653	+13.8%
2011	566	−13.3%
2021	488	−13.8%

Source: Censuses

== Transport ==
There are no railways or major roads passing through the municipality. On the Czech–Polish border is the road border crossing Velké Kunětice / Sławniowice.

== Sights ==
The main landmark of Velké Kunětice is the Church of Our Lady of the Snows. It was rebuilt many times, but it has a preserved medieval core. Around the church are fortifications from the 16th century.
