= Gmina Głuchołazy =

Gmina Głuchołazy Głuchołazy Commune
- Gmina
- Flag Coat of arms
- Interactive map of Gmina Głuchołazy
- Coordinates (Głuchołazy): 50°18′47″N 17°22′27″E
- Country: Poland
- Voivodeship: Opole
- County: Nysa
- Seat: Głuchołazy

Area
  - Total: 167.98 km^{2} (64.86 sq mi)

Population (2019-06-30)
  - Total: 23,707
  - Density: 141.13/km^{2} (365.52/sq mi)
  - Urban: 13,534
  - Rural: 10,173
- Website: http://www.glucholazy.pl

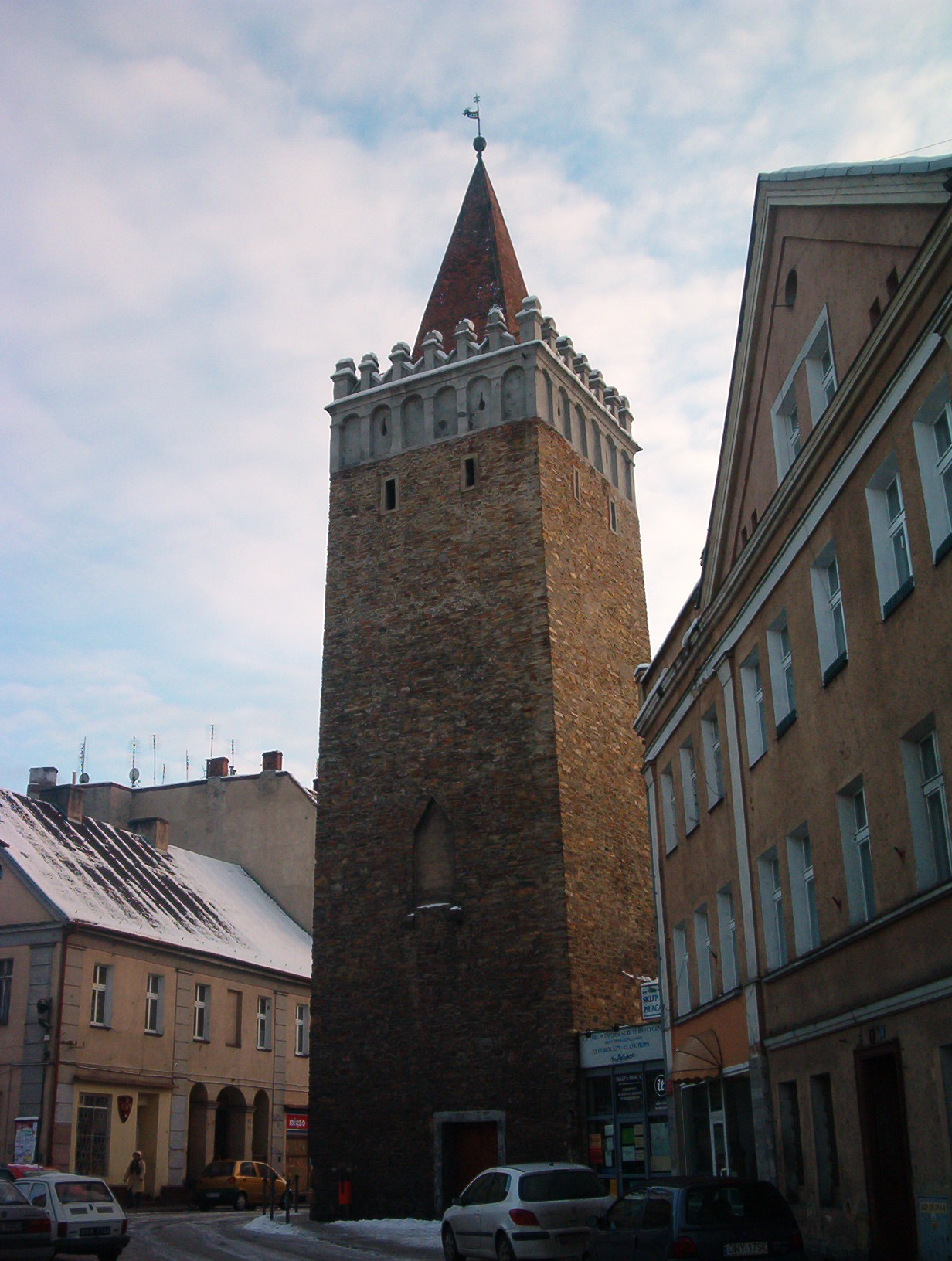
Bad Ziegenhals

Gmina Głuchołazy is an urban-rural gmina (administrative district) in Nysa County, Opole Voivodeship, in south-western Poland, on the Czech border. Its seat is the town of Głuchołazy, which lies approximately 18 kilometres (11 mi) south of Nysa and 56 km (35 mi) south-west of the regional capital Opole.

The gmina covers an area of 167.98 square kilometres (64.9 sq mi), and as of 2019 its total population is 23,707.

The gmina contains part of the protected area called Opawskie Mountains Landscape Park.

== Villages ==
Gmina Głuchołazy includes the following villages and settlements:

- Biskupów
- Bodzanów
- Bolkowice
- Burgrabice
- Charbielin
- Dłużnica
- Gęstwina
- Gierałcice
- Głuchołazy
- Jarnołtówek
- Kletnik
- Kolonia Kaszubska
- Komorów
- Konradów
- Markowice
- Nowy Las
- Nowy Świętów
- Osiedle Pasterówka
- Osiedle Pionierów
- Podlesie
- Pokrzywna
- Polski Świętów
- Rudawa
- Skowronków
- Sławniowice
- Stara Leśniczówka
- Starowice
- Stary Las
- Sucha Kamienica
- Wilamowice Nyskie

== Neighbouring gminas ==
Gmina Głuchołazy is bordered by the gminas of Nysa, Otmuchów and Prudnik. It also borders the Czech Republic.

== Twin towns – sister cities ==
Gmina Głuchołazy is twinned with:

- Jeseník, Czech Republic
- Mikulovice, Czech Republic
- Zlaté Hory, Czech Republic
