= Rudawa, Opole Voivodeship =

Rudawa
- Village
- Location within Poland
- Coordinates: 50°21′17″N 17°22′15″E
- Country: Poland
- Voivodeship: Opole
- County: Nysa
- Gmina: Głuchołazy
- Time zone: UTC+1 (CET)
  - Summer (DST): UTC+2 (CEST)
- Vehicle registration: ONY

Rudawa [ruˈdava] (German: Rothfest) is a part of the village of Bodzanów in the administrative district of Gmina Głuchołazy, within Nysa County, Opole Voivodeship, in south-western Poland, close to the Czech border.

== History ==
In the 10th century the area became part of the emerging Polish state, and later on, it was part of Poland, Bohemia, Prussia, and Germany.

During the Second World War the village was the location of the E42 working party (subcamp) of the nearby Stalag VIII-B/344 prisoner-of-war camp. British prisoners of war were imprisoned there by the Germans. After the defeat of Germany in the war, in 1945, the village became again part of Poland.
