= Charbielin, Opole Voivodeship =

Charbielin
- Village
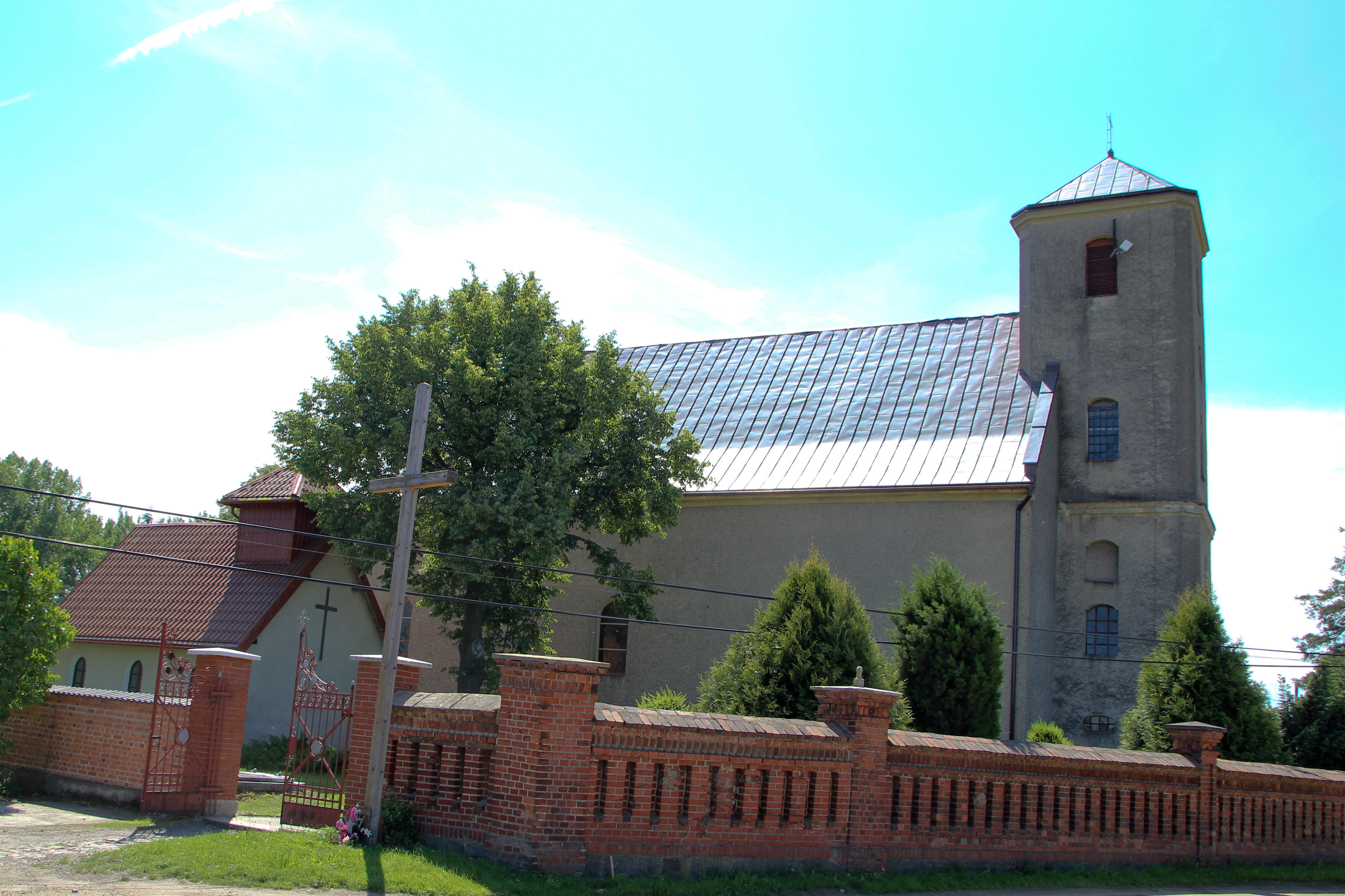
- Church in Charbielin

- Location within Poland
- Coordinates: 50°20′25″N 17°25′56″E
- Country: Poland
- Voivodeship: Opole
- County: Nysa
- Gmina: Głuchołazy

Population
  - Total: 860
- Time zone: UTC+1 (CET)
  - Summer (DST): UTC+2 (CEST)
- Vehicle registration: ONY

Charbielin [xarˈbjɛlin] (German: Ludwigsdorf) is a village in the administrative district of Gmina Głuchołazy, within Nysa County, Opole Voivodeship, in southern Poland, close to the Czech border. It lies approximately 3 km (2 mi) north-east of Głuchołazy, 11 km (7 mi) west of Prudnik, and 24 km (15 mi) south-east of Nysa.

Prior to 1945 the village was part of Germany, and was named Ludwigsdorf

10 Polish citizens were murdered by Nazi Germany in the village during World War II.

== Story ==
=== The Middle Ages ===
The location was first documented in 1263 as villa Ludvigi. In the Liber fundationis episcopatus Vratislaviensis ('Book of endowments of the Bishopric of Wroclaw'), the village is referred to as "Ludvici villa". In 1381 it was mentioned as Ludwici villa and in 1411 as Ludwigisdorff.

=== Ludwigsdorf in Prussia ===
After the First Silesian War in 1742, Ludwigsdorf, along with a majority of Silesia, fell to Prussia. A school was established in the village in 1794. In 1845 the village had a Catholic church, Catholic school, and 178 recorded houses. In that same year, Ludwigsdorf had a population of 1,167 people. In 1855 the village had 39 farms, 34 houses, 63 cottages, a brewery, distillery, wool spinning mill, and two taverns. In 1874 the district of Neuwalde was established, consisting of Ludwigsdorf and Neuwalde.

=== Nazi Germany & WWII ===
In 1933, Ludwigsdorf had a population of 879. Until 1945, the village was located in the Neisse district. In January 1945, the evacuation of the Auschwitz concentration camp led prisoners on foot through Ludwigsdorf and the surrounding region. Many camp inmates dies near the village, including 11 buried in a mass grave in the local parish cemetery. The Red Army captured Ludwigsdorf at the end of March 1945.
