= Stary Las, Opole Voivodeship =

Stary Las
- Village
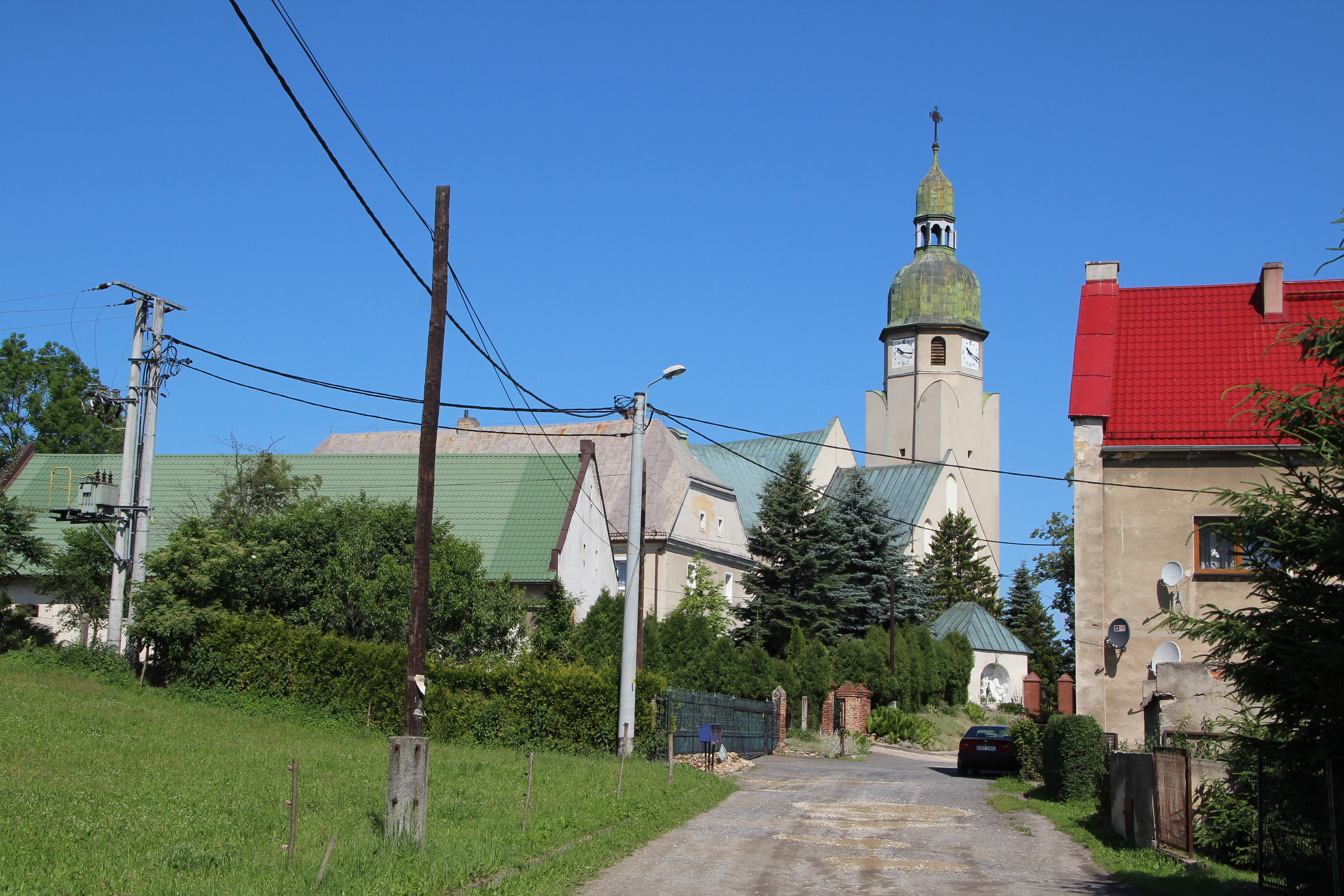
- Church in Stary Las

- Location within Poland
- Coordinates: 50°23′3″N 17°24′19″E
- Country: Poland
- Voivodeship: Opole
- County: Nysa
- Gmina: Głuchołazy
- Highest elevation: 265 m (869 ft)
- Lowest elevation: 258 m (846 ft)
- Population: 720

Stary Las [ˈstarɨ ˈlas] (German: Altewalde) is a village in the administrative district of Gmina Głuchołazy, within Nysa County, Opole Voivodeship, in south-western Poland, close to the Czech border.
