= Sławniowice =

- Village
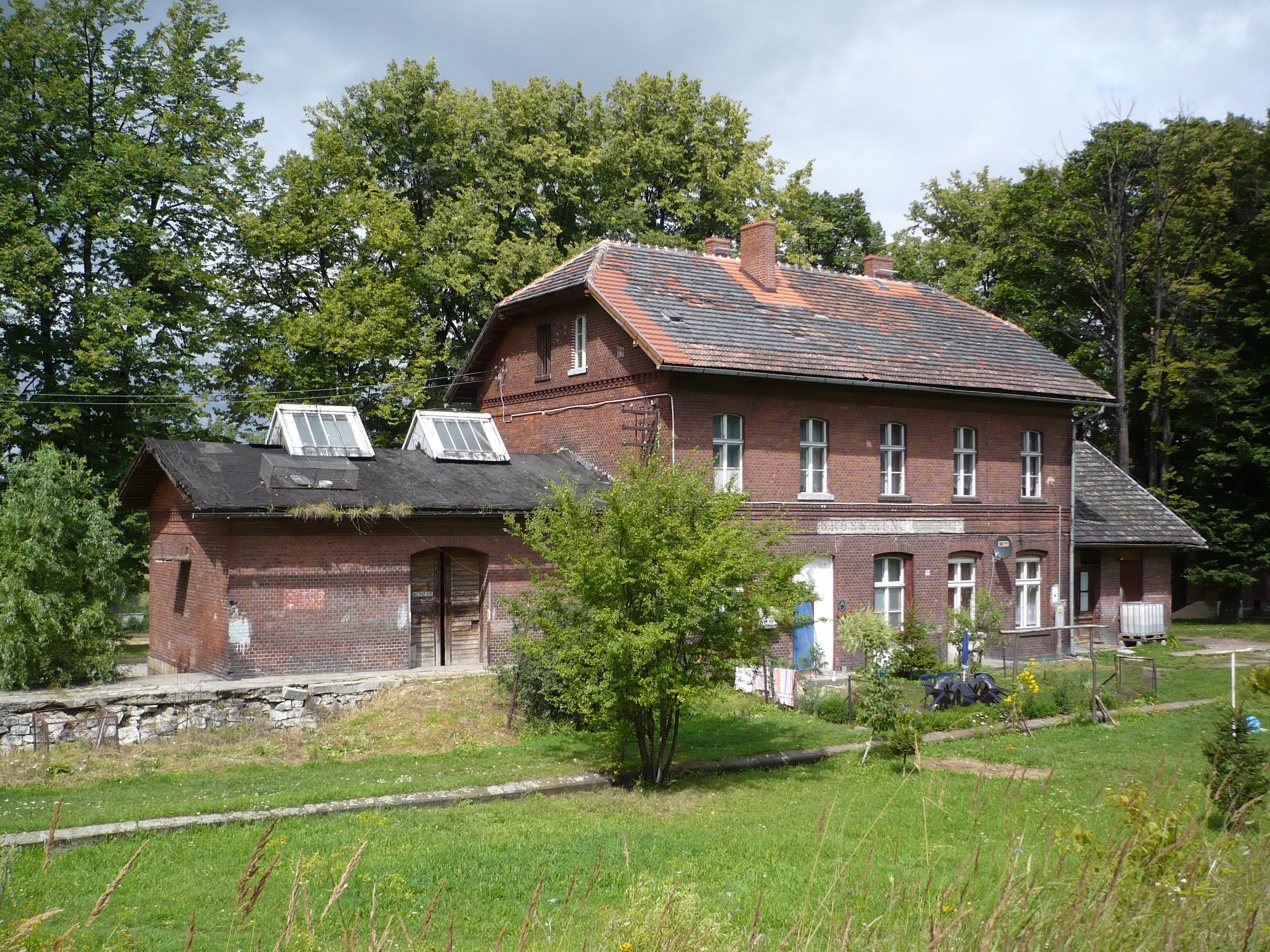
- Former station

- Location within Poland
- Coordinates: 50°20′N 17°16′E
- Country: Poland
- Voivodeship: Opole
- County: Nysa
- Gmina: Głuchołazy
- Highest elevation: 310 m (1,020 ft)
- Lowest elevation: 280 m (920 ft)
- Population: 548

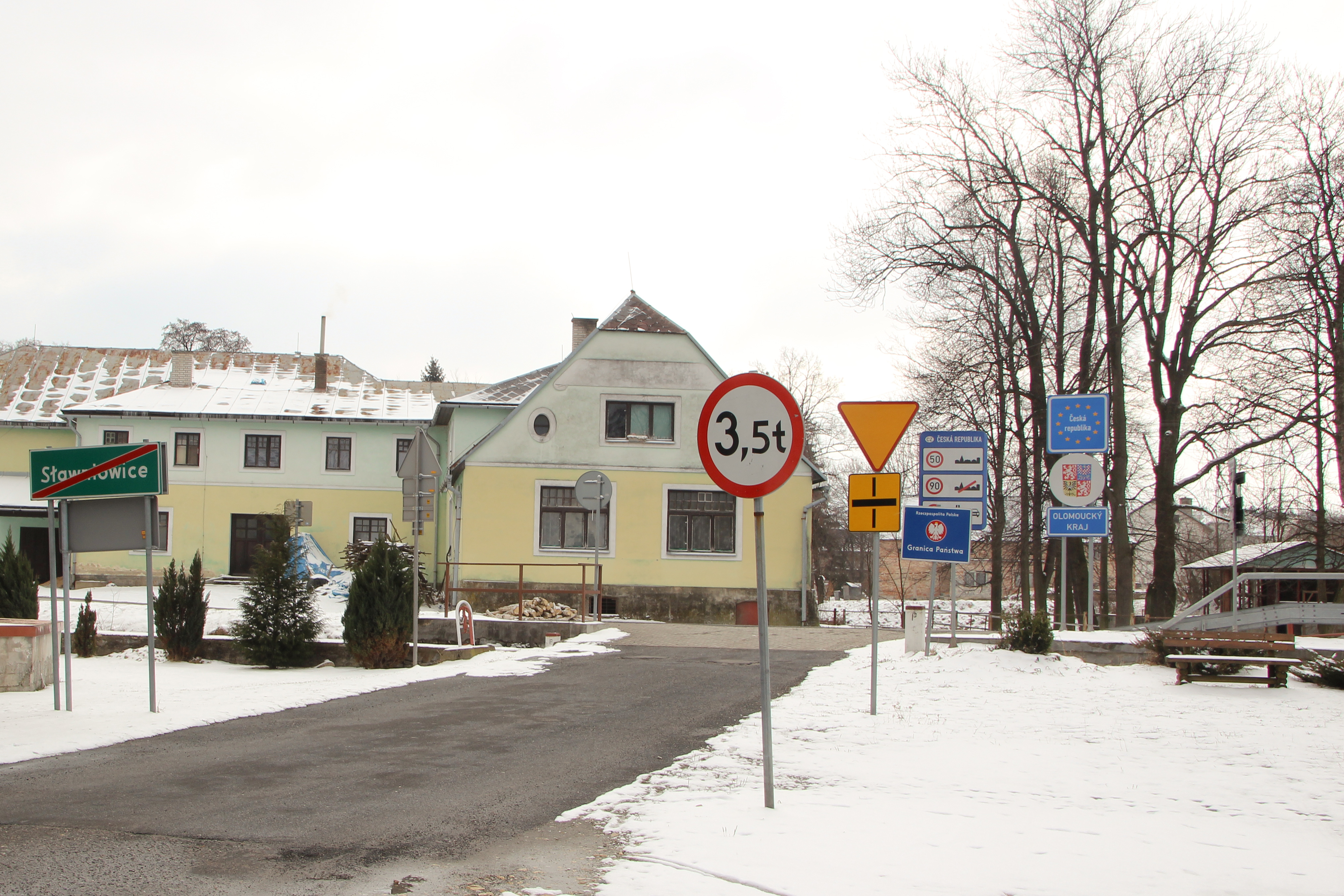
Border with Czech Republic, photographed in 2013

Sławniowice [swavɲɔˈvit͡sɛ] (German: Groß Kunzendorf) is a village in the administrative district of Gmina Głuchołazy, within Nysa County, Opole Voivodeship, in south-western Poland. It is approximately 12 km (7 mi) west of Głuchołazy, and 19 km (12 mi) south of Nysa, on the border with the Czech Republic. Until 1742 it and the Czech village of Velké Kunětice were a single settlement; from 1996 to 2007 it was a border crossing point. Its population was 548 in 2011.

== Economy ==
Marble has been quarried in the village for centuries. Quarrying and shaping marble remains its main industry.

== History ==
Kunzendorf (called Groß Kunzendorf to distinguish it from other places of the same name) is first recorded in 1201 as villa Cunati and in 1382 as Cunczindorff. A Slawnewiz is mentioned in 1291, but its location is uncertain. From the late 13th century the village was within the Duchy of Neisse, an ecclesiastical duchy within the Holy Roman Empire; with the remainder of Upper Silesia, this subsequently became subordinate to the Kingdom of Bohemia. In 1603–15, a peasant revolt took place in the village, one of a series of anti-feudal uprisings against harsh impositions by local landlords under the bishop. In 1742, after the Silesian Wars, what is now Sławniowice became part of the Kingdom of Prussia and was divided from what is now Velké Kunětice, which remained in Austrian Silesia, now in the Czech Republic. It subsequently became part of the German Empire. In 1945, after the defeat of Germany in World War II, it became part of Poland. By an act of the Sejm, it was renamed to Sławniowice in November 1946. A staffed border crossing point was established there in February 1996, operating until both Poland and the Czech Republic became part of the Schengen Area in 2007.

In 1845, the village had 6 marble quarries and a population of 531. The population was 908 in 1885, 992 in 1933, and 1,032 in 1939.

== Notable people ==
- Joseph Krautwald, sculptor, trained at the marble works in the village
