= Nowy Las, Opole Voivodeship =

Nowy Las
- Village
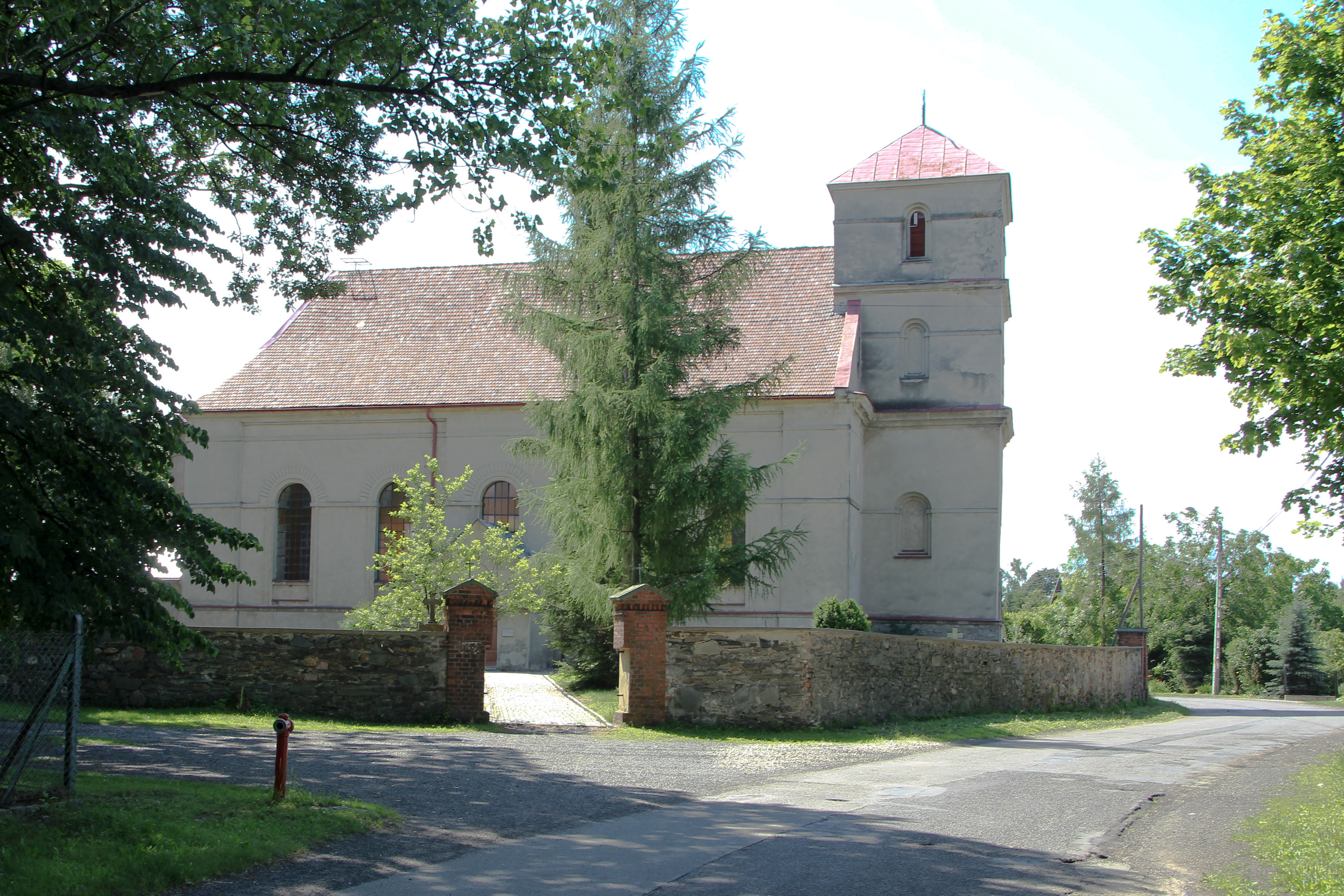
- Church

- Location within Poland
- Coordinates: 50°22′0″N 17°25′2″E
- Country: Poland
- Voivodeship: Opole
- County: Nysa
- Gmina: Głuchołazy

Population
  - Total: 560
- Postal code: 48-340

Nowy Las [ˈnɔvɨ ˈlas] (German: Neuwalde) is a village in the administrative district of Gmina Głuchołazy, within Nysa County, Opole Voivodeship, in south-western Poland, close to the Czech border. It lies approximately 7 km (4 mi) north-east of Głuchołazy, 15 km (9 mi) north-west of Prudnik, and 17 km (11 mi) south-east of Nysa.
