= Nowy Świętów =

- Village
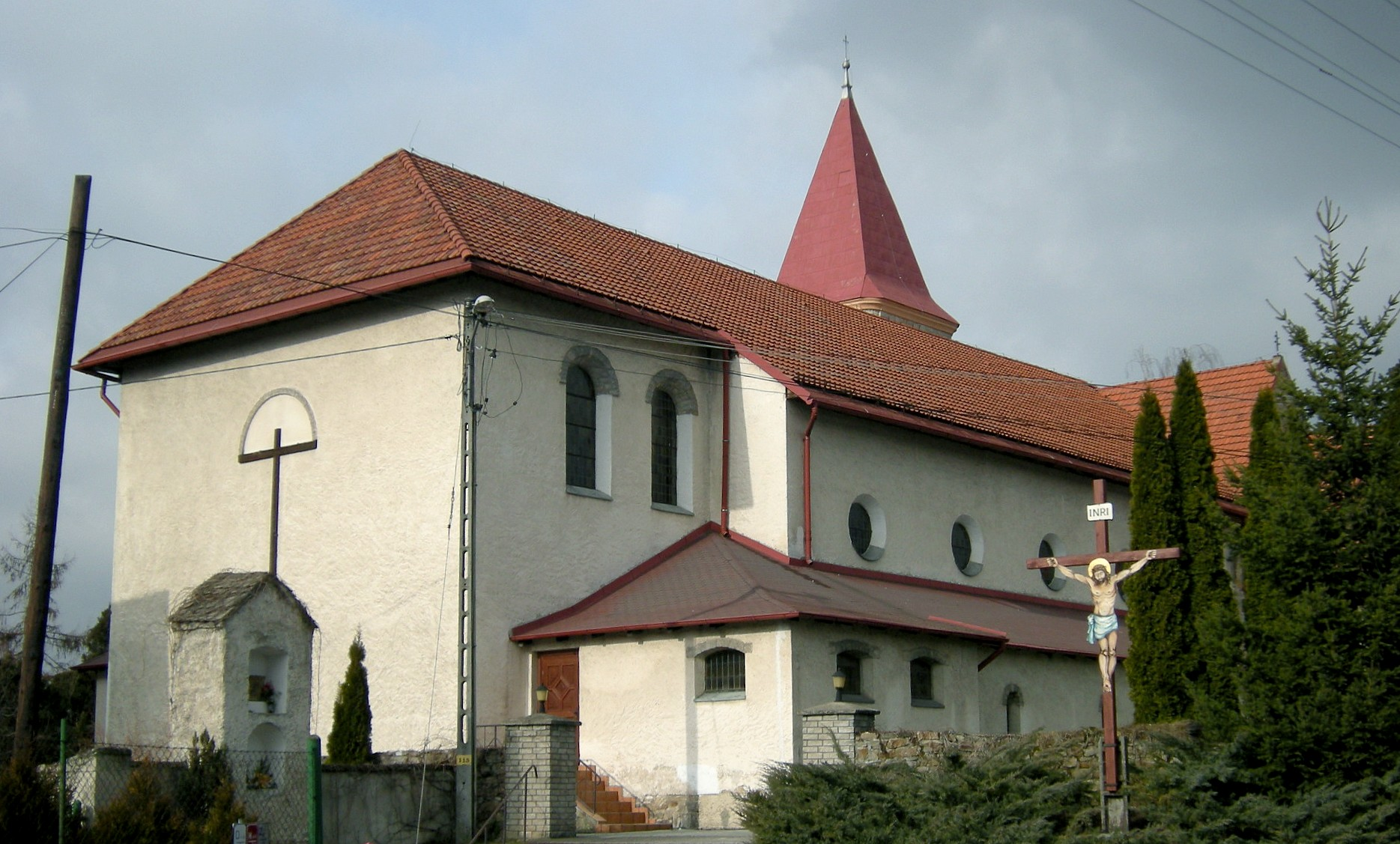
- Christ the King church in Nowy Świętów

- Location within Poland
- Coordinates: 50°22′25″N 17°21′36″E
- Country: Poland
- Voivodeship: Opole
- County: Nysa
- Gmina: Głuchołazy
- First mentioned: 1300
- Highest elevation: 255 m (837 ft)
- Lowest elevation: 252 m (827 ft)
- Population: 1,000
- Time zone: UTC+1 (CET)
  - Summer (DST): UTC+2 (CEST)
- Vehicle registration: ONY

Nowy Świętów (Polish: [ˈnɔvɨ ˈɕfjɛntuf], German: Deutsch Wette) is a village in the administrative district of Gmina Głuchołazy, within Nysa County, Opole Voivodeship, in south-western Poland, close to the Czech border.

== History ==
The village was first mentioned in 1300, when it was part of fragmented Piast-ruled Poland. Later on, it was also part of Bohemia (Czechia), Prussia, and Germany. During World War II, the Germans operated the E477 forced labour subcamp of the Stalag VIII-B/344 prisoner-of-war camp in the village. After Germany's defeat in the war, in 1945, the village became again part of Poland.

== Transport ==
There is a train station in Nowy Świętów, and the Voivodeship road 411 also passes through the village.
