= Wilamowice Nyskie =

- Village
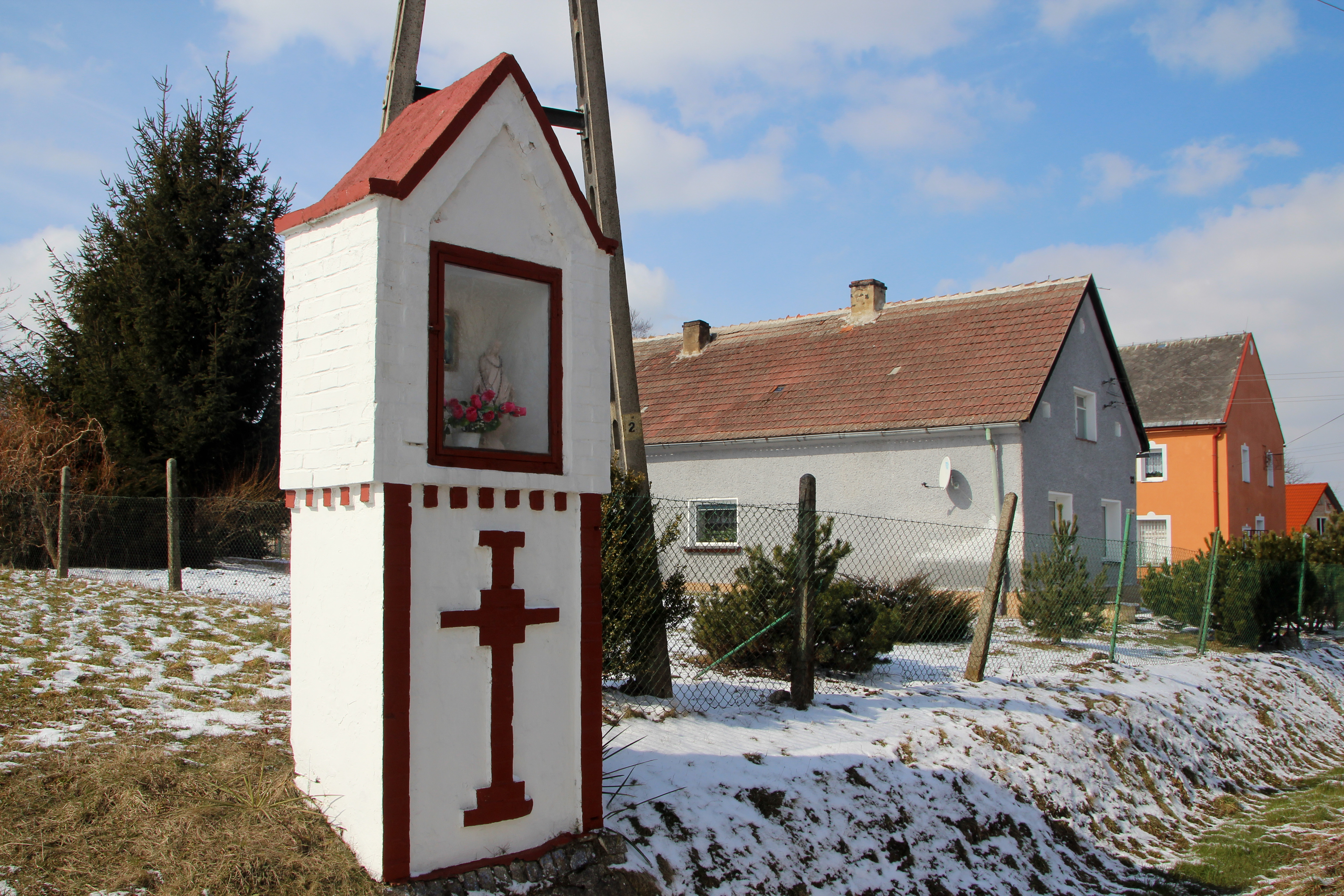
- Wayside shrine in Wilamowice Nyskie

- Location within Poland
- Coordinates: 50°22′N 17°21′E
- Country: Poland
- Voivodeship: Opole
- County: Nysa
- Gmina: Głuchołazy
- Population: 224

Wilamowice Nyskie [vilamɔˈvit͡sɛ ˈnɨskʲɛ] (German: Winsdorf) is a village in the administrative district of Gmina Głuchołazy, within Nysa County, Opole Voivodeship, in south-western Poland, close to the Czech border. It lies approximately 8 km (5 mi) north of Głuchołazy, and 15 km (9 mi) south of Nysa.
