= Bodzanów, Opole Voivodeship =

Bodzanów
- Village
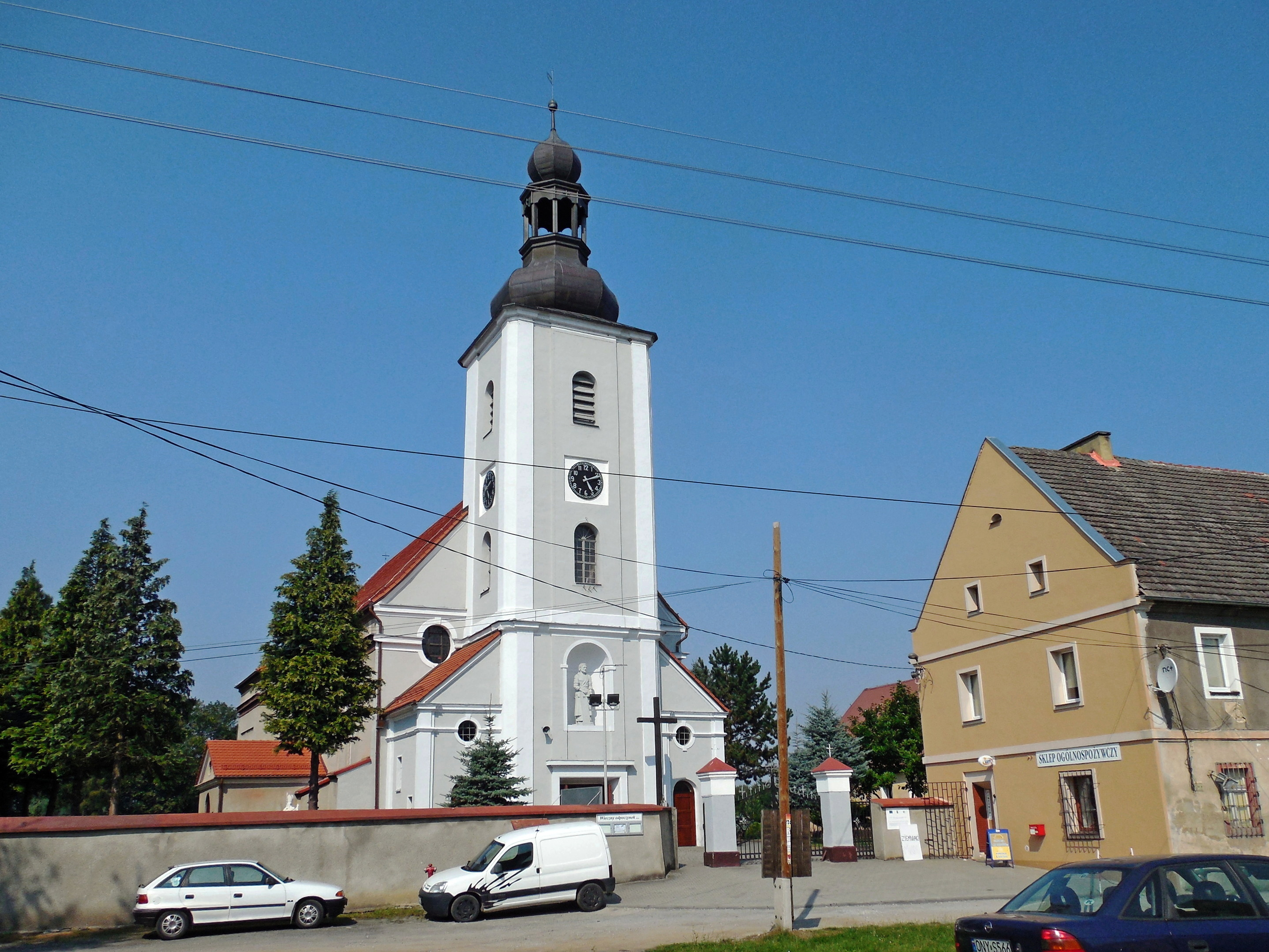
- Church of Saint Joseph

- Location within Poland
- Coordinates: 50°20′22″N 17°22′59″E
- Country: Poland
- Voivodeship: Opole
- County: Nysa
- Gmina: Głuchołazy
- Highest elevation: 285 m (935 ft)
- Lowest elevation: 280 m (920 ft)

Population (approx.)
  - Total: 1,500

Bodzanów [bɔˈd͡zanuf] (German: Langendorf) is a village in the administrative district of Gmina Głuchołazy, within Nysa County, Opole Voivodeship, in south-western Poland, close to the Czech border.
