= Wisconsin's Jefferson County 1st Assembly district =

Former American legislative district

Wisconsin's Jefferson County 1st State Assembly district
- Obsolete
- Notes: 1848–1922

Wisconsin's Jefferson County 1st Assembly district was a district in the Wisconsin State Assembly for much of the history of the state of Wisconsin, prior to the legislative redistricting reforms of 1972 which created the current numbered districts. Located in southeast Wisconsin, the district was one of the 66 original Assembly districts defined in Article XIV of the Constitution of Wisconsin. The Constitution originally allocated three districts for Jefferson County, Wisconsin; this district originally comprised the northwest quadrant of Jefferson County.

The district was in use for the first 74 years of Wisconsin's history, from 1848 to 1922.

== List of representatives ==
List of representatives from the Jefferson County 1st district
| Member | Party | Residence | Term start | Term end | Leg. |
|---|---|---|---|---|---|
District created
| Wales Emmons | Dem. | Watertown | June 5, 1848 | January 1, 1849 | 1st |
| Benjamin Nute | Dem. | Milford | January 1, 1849 | January 7, 1850 | 2nd |
| Abram Vanderpool | Dem. | Waterloo | January 7, 1850 | January 6, 1851 | 3rd |
| Patrick Rogan | Dem. | Watertown | January 6, 1851 | January 5, 1852 | 4th |
| Thomas R. Mott | Whig | Watertown | January 5, 1852 | January 3, 1853 | 5th |
| Patrick Rogan | Dem. | Watertown | January 3, 1853 | January 2, 1854 | 6th |
| Theodore Bernhardt | Dem. | Watertown | January 2, 1854 | January 1, 1855 | 7th |
| Patrick Rogan | Dem. | Watertown | January 1, 1855 | January 7, 1856 | 8th |
| William Chappell | Dem. | Watertown | January 7, 1856 | January 5, 1857 | 9th |
| Delatus Aspinwall | Rep. | Farmington | January 5, 1857 | January 4, 1858 | 10th |
| Miles Holmes | Rep. | Palmyra | January 4, 1858 | January 3, 1859 | 11th |
| Alexander J. Craig | Rep. | Palmyra | January 3, 1859 | January 2, 1860 | 12th |
| Norman Horton | Rep. | Cold Spring | January 2, 1860 | January 7, 1861 | 13th |
| Jost Petrie | Rep. | Concord | January 7, 1861 | January 6, 1862 | 14th |
| Peter Rogan | Dem. | Watertown | January 6, 1862 | January 1, 1863 | 15th |
| Emil Rothe | Dem. | Watertown | January 1, 1863 | January 4, 1864 | 16th |
| Robert Hass | Dem. | Watertown | January 4, 1864 | January 2, 1865 | 17th |
| Jonathan Piper | Dem. | Ixonia | January 2, 1865 | January 1, 1866 | 18th |
| Patrick Rogan | Dem. | Watertown | January 1, 1866 | January 7, 1867 | 19th |
| Thomas Shinnick | Dem. | Watertown | January 7, 1867 | January 6, 1868 | 20th |
| Henry S. Howell | Dem. | Watertown | January 6, 1868 | January 4, 1869 | 21st |
| John Rutledge | Dem. | Ixonia | January 4, 1869 | January 3, 1870 | 22nd |
| Daniel Hall | Rep. | Watertown | January 3, 1870 | January 6, 1873 | 23rd 24th 25th |
| Patrick Devy | Dem. | Watertown | January 6, 1873 | January 5, 1874 | 26th |
| Charles Beckman | Ref. | Watertown | January 5, 1874 | January 4, 1875 | 27th |
| Christian Mayer | Ref. | Watertown | January 4, 1875 | January 3, 1876 | 28th |
| Thomas Shinnick | Dem. | Watertown | January 3, 1876 | January 1, 1877 | 29th |
| Hezekiah Flinn | Dem. | Watertown | January 1, 1877 | January 5, 1880 | 30th 31st 32nd |
| Jesse Stone | Rep. | Watertown | January 5, 1880 | January 3, 1881 | 33rd |
| Humphrey E. Humphrey | Dem. | Ixonia | January 3, 1881 | January 2, 1882 | 34th |
| Jesse Stone | Rep. | Watertown | January 2, 1882 | January 1, 1883 | 35th |
| Francis V. Piper | Dem. | Ixonia | January 1, 1883 | January 5, 1885 | 36th |
| Carl R. Feld | Dem. | Watertown | January 5, 1885 | January 5, 1891 | 37th 38th 39th |
| C. Hugo Jacobi | Dem. | Watertown | January 5, 1891 | January 7, 1895 | 40th 41st |
| John Conway | Dem. | Watertown | January 7, 1895 | January 4, 1897 | 42nd |
| Jesse Stone | Rep. | Watertown | January 4, 1897 | January 2, 1899 | 43rd |
| Harman Grube | Dem. | Watertown | January 2, 1899 | January 7, 1901 | 44th |
| George J. Kern | Dem. | Sullivan | January 7, 1901 | January 2, 1905 | 45th 46th |
| Edward Racek | Dem. | Watertown | January 2, 1905 | January 7, 1907 | 47th |
| Fred Smith | Dem. | Ixonia | January 7, 1907 | January 4, 1909 | 48th |
| C. F. Viebahn | Dem. | Watertown | January 4, 1909 | January 4, 1915 | 49th 50th 51st |
| H. J. Grell | Dem. | Johnson Creek | January 4, 1915 | January 6, 1919 | 52nd 53rd |
| John Mitchell | Rep. | Palmyra | January 6, 1919 | January 3, 1921 | 54th |
| Eugene H. Killian | Rep. | Watertown | January 3, 1921 | January 1, 1923 | 55th |
District abolished by 1921 Wisconsin Act 470; Jefferson County was consolidated as a single-county Assembly district
