= John Mitchell (Wisconsin politician, born 1841) =

American politician (1841–1924)

Member of the Wisconsin State Assembly from the Jefferson 1st district
- In office January 6, 1919 – January 3, 1921
- Preceded by: H. J. Grell
- Succeeded by: Eugene H. Killian

Personal details
- Born: January 8, 1841 England, UK
- Died: January 15, 1924 (aged 83) Palmyra, Wisconsin, U.S.
- Resting place: Zion Cemetery, Sullivan, Wisconsin
- Party: Republican
- Spouse: Elizabeth J. Bluett

John Mitchell (January 8, 1841 – January 15, 1924) was an English American immigrant, farmer, and Republican politician from Jefferson County, Wisconsin. He served one term in the Wisconsin State Assembly, representing Jefferson County's 1st Assembly district during the 54th Wisconsin Legislature (1919–1920).

Wisconsin State Assembly
Preceded by H. J. Grell	Member of the Wisconsin State Assembly from the Jefferson 1st district January 6, 1919 – January 3, 1921	Succeeded by Eugene H. Killian
