= Richards Hill Residential Historic District =

Historic district in Wisconsin, United States

- U.S. National Register of Historic Places
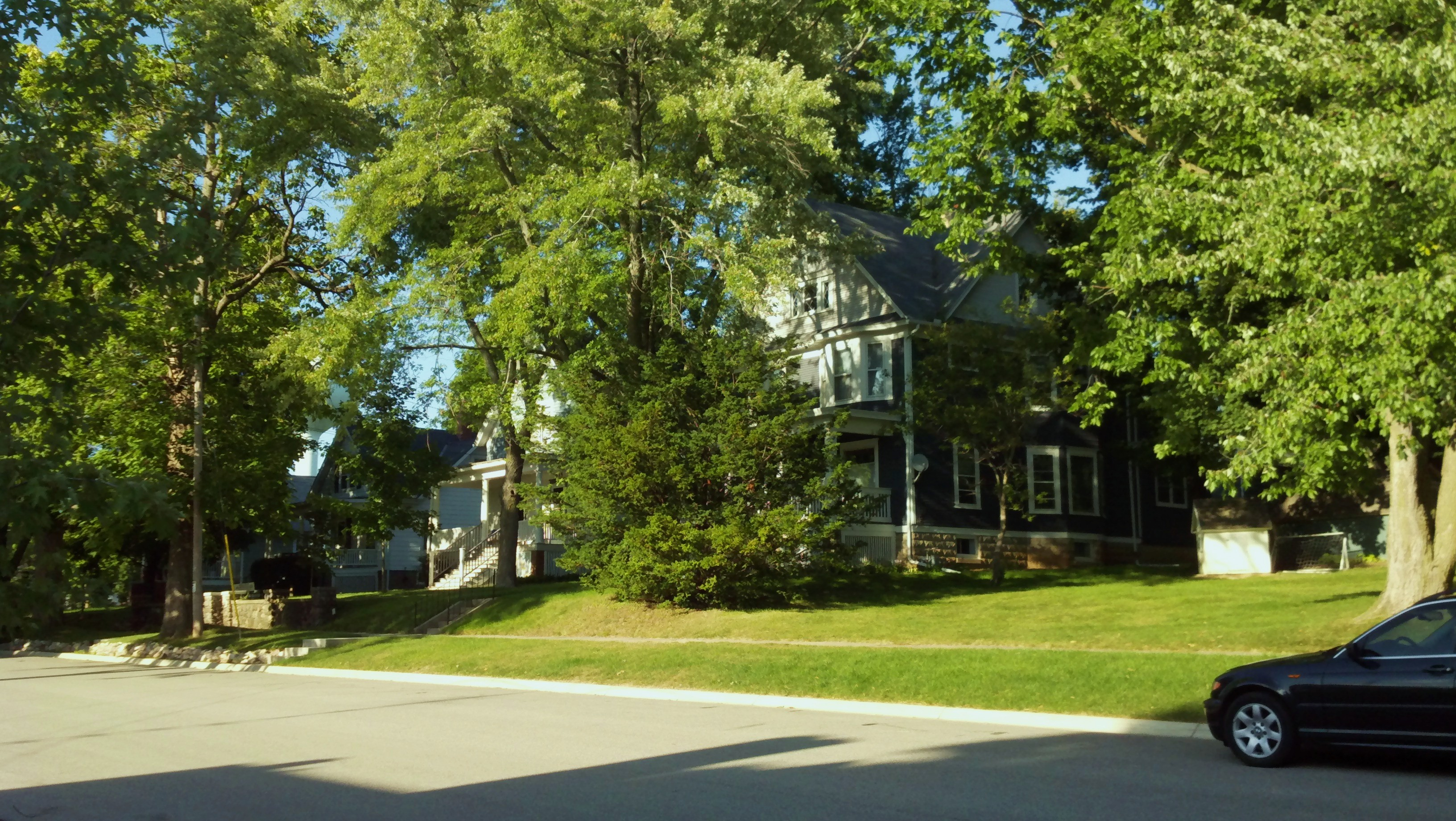
- A portion of the district.

- Location within Wisconsin
- Location: Roughly bounded by Western, Richards, Thomas & Harvey Aves., Livsey Pl. & Charles St. Watertown, Wisconsin
- Coordinates: 43°11′08″N 88°42′34″W
- NRHP reference No.: 13000403
- Added to NRHP: June 14, 2013

The Richards Hill Residential Historic District is a national historic district in Watertown, Wisconsin. The district includes 62 buildings, nearly all of which are houses, of which 51 are considered contributing buildings to the district's historic character.

== History ==
The land which makes up the neighborhood was originally the estate of John Richards, who built the Octagon House on his property in the 1850s. Richards gradually subdivided his land over the late nineteenth century, and by the early twentieth century he had completely split the property into residential lots. The land was near Northwestern College, and many professors at the college bought lots in the neighborhood for their homes. The houses in the district represent the popular architectural styles of the early twentieth century, including Queen Anne, Bungalow, and period revival styles such as Tudor and Dutch Colonial. Architect George Fred Keck, who later became well known for his Modernist work, designed the Tudor Revival Hans David & Helen Gaebler House in 1926.

The district was added to the State Register of Historic Places in 2012 and to the National Register of Historic Places the following year. Two properties in the district, the Octagon House and the First Kindergarten, are listed individually on the National Register; the latter was moved onto the Octagon House property in 1957 by the Watertown Historical Society.
