= Margarethe Schurz =

American educator (1833–1876)

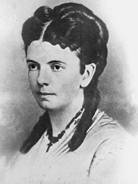
- Born: Margarethe Meyer; August 27, 1833; Hamburg, Germany
- Died: March 15, 1876 (aged 42)
- Occupations: Educator, homemaker
- Known for: Founder of the first kindergarten in the United States

Margarethe Meyer-Schurz (born Margarethe Meyer; also called Margaretha Meyer-Schurz or just Margarethe Schurz; 27 August 1833 – 15 March 1876) was a German-American woman who opened the first German-language kindergarten in the United States at Watertown, Wisconsin.

== Early life ==
Carl Schurz and Margarethe Meyer Schurz, possibly shortly after their marriage in 1852.

Margarethe Meyer-Schurz was born in Hamburg, Germany, as the youngest daughter of Heinrich Christian Meyer, on August 27, 1833. Her mother died only a few hours after her birth. Her father encouraged education and the arts. In Hamburg, she studied under educators influenced by the creator of the "kindergarten" concept, child advocate Friedrich Fröbel. Her father died when she was 15 years old. Through her older sisters Amalie and Bertha, she came into early contact with the "Society of German Catholics" and later attended the "School for the Female Sex". After her older sister Bertha divorced her husband Friedrich Traun, she entered a new marriage with thee excommunicated priest Johannes Ronge, the founder of the schismatic German Catholics.

== Exile ==
After the failed revolution of 1848, Bertha followed Johannes Ronge into exile in London. In 1849, Margarethe and her sister Bertha met Fröbel. Bertha Meyer spent 1850 and 1851 advancing the concept, opening Kindergartens across the German States. In 1851, Bertha and her spouse, Johannes Ronge, opened the England Infant Garden in Tavistock Place, the first Kindergarten in the English-speaking community. Margarethe Meyer taught at the England Infant Garden before moving to Watertown, Wisconsin with her husband Carl Schurz. In the fall of 1851, Bertha became seriously sick and desperately needed help in the household. Because of this, Margarethe traveled to London as well. There, she met Carl Schurz who (like Ronge) had to leave Germany for political reasons. Margarethe and Carl entered a civil marriage and traveled soon thereafter to the United States. Both were members of the Irving Literary Society. In Watertown, Wisconsin, they started a small farm, where Margarethe's gift for financial affairs put them at an advantage.

== United States ==
Margarethe Meyer brought Fröbel's ideas to America. She spent two years in New York then went west. She employed Fröbel's philosophy while caring for her daughter, Agathe Schurz, and four neighborhood children in Wisconsin, leading them in games, songs and group activities channeling their energy and preparing them for primary school. Other Wisconsin parents were impressed and prevailed upon Schurz to open a Watertown kindergarten, the first in the United States. And like most of the early kindergartens in the United States, the class was conducted in the German language. The Watertown kindergarten continued until the outbreak of World War I, when it was closed due to opposition to the German language's use. (Note: The Watertown Kindergarten was in operation from fall of 1854 to fall of 1856, when Margarethe Schurz and her family relocated to Milwaukee, Wisconsin, for the winters, returning to Watertown only in the summers. In 1856 the mortgage on her home was foreclosed. As a result, she moved back to Hamburg in June of the same year. After about a year she returned to the United States and settled in Missouri. The school did not continue after 1856 until it was brought back into public education [date unknown].)

In 1859, the Transcendentalist Elizabeth Peabody visited the Schurz home at Watertown, Wisconsin, and was impressed with the young Agathe Schurz's ability and maturity. Margarete Meyer-Schurz told her about Fröbel's teachings, and Peabody converted to the kindergarten cause. While Mrs. Schurz's health became such that she could not continue with her work, Peabody became a nationally known advocate of early education, and helped bring kindergartens into widespread use.

Margarethe Meyer-Schurz died at the age of 42, on March 15, 1876, and only three days after the birth of her son, Herbert.

== Legacy ==
On May 2, 1929, a memorial tablet was dedicated in Watertown, Wisconsin, a few feet from the site of the building where she founded the first kindergarten in America. "In memory of Mrs. Carl Schurz (Margarethe Meyer Schurz) Aug. 27, 1833 -- March 15, 1876, who established on this site the first kindergarten in America, 1856."

The restored first kindergarten building originally stood at the corner of N. Second and Jones Streets, Watertown, and was later moved to the grounds of the Octagon House in December 1956. The restored building was dedicated on September 15, 1957. The interior, a living room used as a classroom, remains furnished in the period and portrays a kindergarten class in progress. It was added to the National Register of Historic Places in 1972.

== Literature ==
- Wisconsin Historical Society-Watertown Times-09-07-1928 newspaper article; Watertown, the Birthplace of America's Kindergarten.
- Greta Anderson: More than Petticoats. Remarkable Wisconsin Women. Guilford/USA, 2004, pp. 37–48
- Hannah Werwath Swart: Margarethe Meyer Schurz. A Biography. Watertown, 1967.
- Heinrich Adolph Meyer: Erinnerungen an Heinrich Christian Meyer. Für die Familie gesammelt von seinem Sohne Heinr. Ad. Meyer. Hamburg, 1887
- Amalie Henriette Westendarp: Meine Mutter. Agathe Margarethe Meyer, geb. Beusch. geb. 1794, gest. 1833. Handschriftliche Aufzeichnungen. Archiv der Firma H. C. Meyer jr. Hamburg, 1887
- Dieter Rednak: Heinrich Christian Meyer (1797–1848) – genannt „Stockmeyer“. Vom Handwerker zum Großindustriellen. Eine biedermeierliche Karriere. Hamburg, 1992
- Helmut und Marianne Hirsch: "Stammte Margarethe Meyer-Schurz aus einer ursprünglich jüdischen Familie? Zur Problematik ihrer ersten Biographie". In: Ludger Heid, Joachim H. Knoll (Hrsg.) Deutsch-Jüdische Geschichte. Stuttgart/Bonn 1992, pp. 85-106
- Marie Kortmann: Emilie Wüstenfeld. Eine Hamburger Bürgerin. Hamburg 1927
- Inge Grolle: "Bertha Traun-Ronge 1818–1863). Das Ideal und das Leben". In: Irina Hundt (Hrsg.): Vom Salon zur Barrikade. Frauen der Heinezeit. Stuttgart, 2002, pp. 377–389.
- Inge Grolle: Die freisinnigen Frauen. Charlotte Paulsen, Johanna Goldschmidt, Emilie Wüstenfeld. Bremen, 2000
- Rita Bake: "Bertha Traun (Bertha Ronge geb. Meyer geschiedene Traun). Mitbegründerin des Frauenvereins zur Unterstützung der Deutschkatholiken, des Sozialen Vereins zur Ausgleichung konfessioneller Unterschiede und der Hochschule für das weibliche Geschlecht". In: Rita Bake/ Brita Reimers (Hrsg.): Stadt der toten Frauen. Frauenportraits und Lebensbilder vom Friedhof Hamburg Ohlsdorf. Hamburg, 1997, pp. 240–242
- Carl Schurz: Lebenserinnerungen. Vom deutschen Freiheitskämpfer zum amerikanischen Staatsmann. Mit einem Vorwort von Theodor Heuss. Zürich, 1988
- Gerd Stolz: "Wie der Kindergarten nach Amerika kam – Margarethe Meyer Schurz und die „deutsche Idee"'. In: Globus, H. 4/2003, pp. 6–9.
- Gerd Stolz: "Margarethe Meyer Schurz – eine Pionierin der Kindergarten-Idee aus Norddeutschland in den USA". In: Natur- und Landeskunde, 111.Jg., H. 3/4, 2004, pp. 29–35.
- Gerd Stolz: Das Leben der Margarethe Meyer Schurz. Wegbereiterin des Kindergartens in den USA. Husum, 2007. ISBN 978-3-89876-357-8
- James E. Haas: Conrad Poppenhusen. The Life of a German-American Industrial Pioneer. Baltimore, 2004
- Eckhart Pilick: Lexikon freireligiöser Personen. Pfalz, 2006
- Mrs. Follen: The Pedler of dust Sticks. Boston, 1854
- Elizabeth Jenkins: "How the Kindergarten Found its Way to America". Wisconsin Magazine of History 14.1 (1930), pp. 46–62.
- Manfred Berger: "Margaretha Schurz: Amerikas First Kindergarten", in: Kinderzeit 1996/H. 3
- Sylvia Paletschek: Frauen und Dissens. Frauen im Deutschkatholizismus und in den freien Gemeinden 1841–1852. Göttingen, 1990
