= Christian Mayer (Wisconsin politician) =

American politician

Christian Mayer (January 24, 1827 - August 6, 1910) was an American carpenter and businessman from Watertown, Wisconsin who manufactured doors and sash windows. He served as an alderman in, and mayor of, that city, and as a member of the Wisconsin State Assembly.

== Background ==
Mayer was born on January 24, 1827, in Bretten, then part of the Grand Duchy of Baden. He received a common school education. He emigrated to the United States in 1852. He spent six months in Brooklyn as a carpenter and joiner, then settled for a while in Buffalo, New York, working at the Buffalo City Planing-Mills. While there he married Frederika Melcher on October 18, 1855; the couple would eventually have twelve children. In 1856 or 1857 (accounts vary) they moved to Wisconsin, settling in Watertown and worked as a carpenter until 1861. He then began manufacturing doors, window sashes and window blinds, and operating a planing mill.

== Public office ==
He had been alderman of Watertown seven years, and served as mayor of that city for one term, when in 1874 he was elected to the Assembly's 1st Jefferson County district (which included the Towns of Ixonia and Watertown as well as the entire City of Watertown, including those two wards which actually were in Dodge County) as a member of the Reform Party, a short-lived coalition of Democrats, reform and Liberal Republicans, and Grangers formed in 1873 which had secured the election of a Governor of Wisconsin and a number of state legislators; incumbent Charles Beckman, a Reformer, was not running for re-election. Mayer won with 969 votes to 781 for Republican August Volkmann. He was assigned to the standing committee on ways and means.

He was not a candidate for re-election in 1875, and was succeeded by Democrat Thomas Shinnick.

== After the Assembly ==
He continued to serve as an alderman in Watertown.

He died August 6, 1910, as a result of a broken hip sustained in a fall. His wife had died about two years previously. They were survived by twelve children: seven daughters and five sons. He was buried in Watertown's Oak Hill Cemetery.
