= Górsko, West Pomeranian Voivodeship =

Górsko
- Village
- Location within Poland
- Coordinates: 54°32′2″N 16°40′42″E
- Country: Poland
- Voivodeship: West Pomeranian
- County: Sławno
- Gmina: Postomino

Górsko (Polish pronunciation: [ˈɡurskɔ]; formerly German: Görshagen) is a village in the administrative district of Gmina Postomino, within Sławno County, West Pomeranian Voivodeship, in north-western Poland. It lies approximately 5 km (3 mi) north-west of Postomino, 19 km (12 mi) north of Sławno, and 185 km (115 mi) north-east of the regional capital Szczecin.

For the history of the region, see History of Pomerania.

== Notable locals ==
- Charles Beckman, Wisconsin farmer, justice, mayor and legislator
