= Elise Averdieck =

German social activist

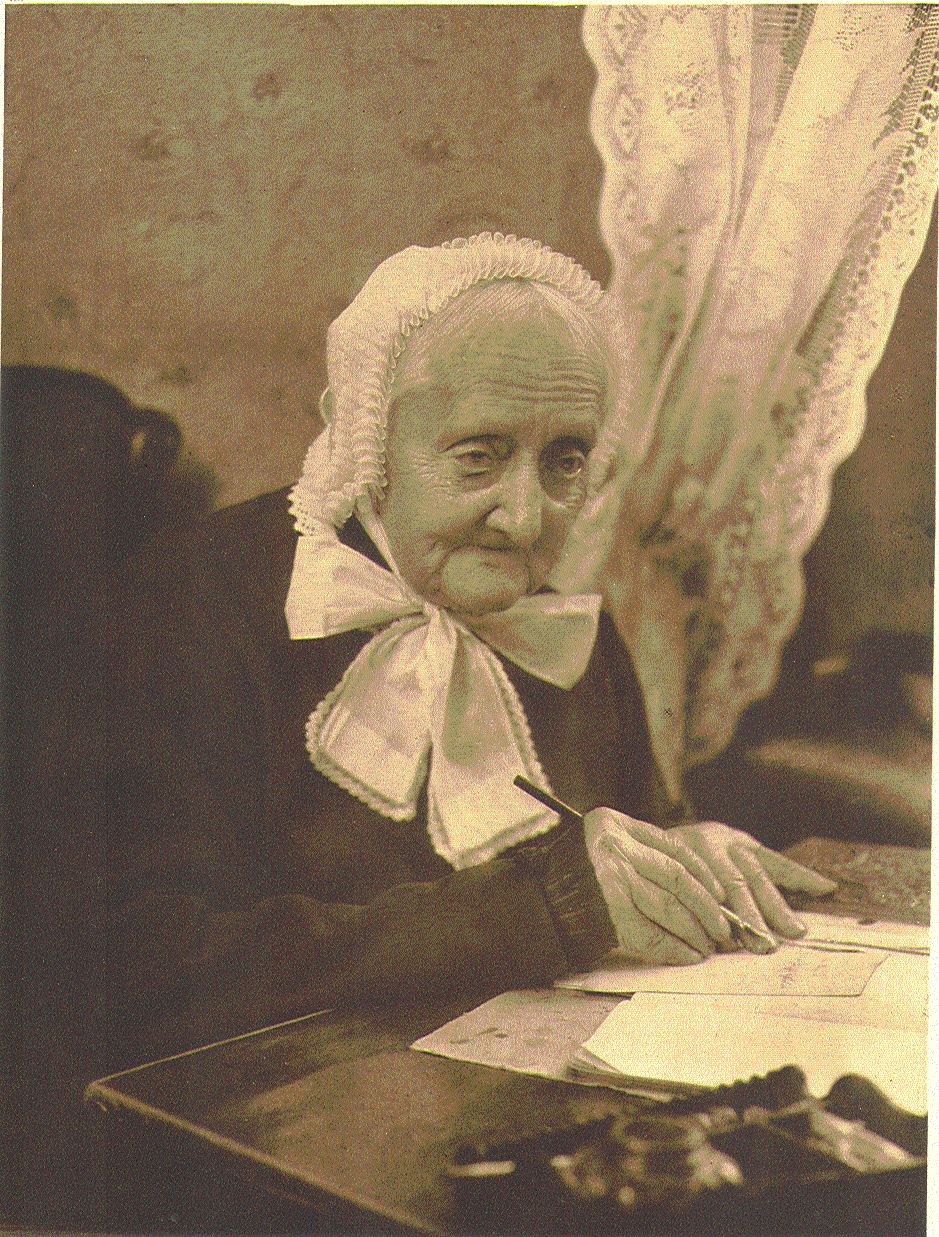
- Elise Averdieck in 1905; photo by Rudolf Dührkoop
- Born: February 26, 1808
- Died: November 4, 1907 (aged 99)
- Education: Höhere Töchterschule Hamburg
- Occupations: social activist, deaconess

Elise Averdieck (26 February 1808 – 4 November 1907) was a German social activist, a deaconess, and writer. A friend of Amalie Sieveking, whose charitable work she continued, she is regarded as a figure typical of the Erweckung, the socially active Christian revival sweeping through Germany in the 19th century. The first half of her life she was a teacher, a writer, and a nurse; only in the second half of her life did she become a deaconess and led a small community of like-minded women.

Averdieck grew up in a Hamburg where poverty had increased greatly since the beginning of the 19th century, and although there were both state-supported and private initiatives to alleviate the fate of the poor, these efforts were not well coordinated and were frequently based on completely different ideas on what caused poverty, and what it meant. For Averdieck, poverty came from God and was thus a blessing in its own right. Though she considered the experience of poverty to be educational, she did not feel the plight of poverty need not be improved, and among those who, like her, came to social work through Lutheran piety, this was a strong imperative to act.

== Biography ==
Averdieck was the second daughter of the wealthy Hamburg merchant Georg Friedrich Averdieck (1774–1839). Her brother Edward (1810–82) was an architect. Besides two years spent in Berlin (1813–1815), she lived in Hamburg all of her life. Born on 26 February 1808, she was educated at home, at two private schools, and at one of Hamburg's Höhere Töchterschule, where she received religious instruction from Johann Wilhelm Rautenberg, who had also influenced Amalie Sieveking. While she seemed not to have turned to piety immediately after encountering Rautenberg, he remained a spiritual adviser and contributed toward her conversion in 1835.

He also helped her in opening up a boys' school in St. Georg, Hamburg (1838), the populous suburb of Hamburg where Rautenberg was active, and got her to teach in the Sunday school he had founded in 1825.

Every person, whether man or woman, should learn as much and for as long as he can. One can never learn too much.

In 1856, she started her own school: in a rented building, she educated poor children—who paid tuition—in reading, writing, and math, preparing them for further education. She taught English and religion herself. She was especially fond of teaching the youngest children, and wrote a Bible-based alphabet book for the purpose, whose narrative arc spanned from Creation to Eternal life and whose texts included reference to the Ten Commandments, the Apostles' Creed, and the Lord's Prayer; Mein erstes Lesebuch was thus also a catechism. In 1860, Averdieck opened a Christian home for nursing the sick called "Bethesda" that operated in coordination with the deaconess at Kaiserwerther.
