= Patrick Rogan (Wisconsin politician) =

19th century American politician

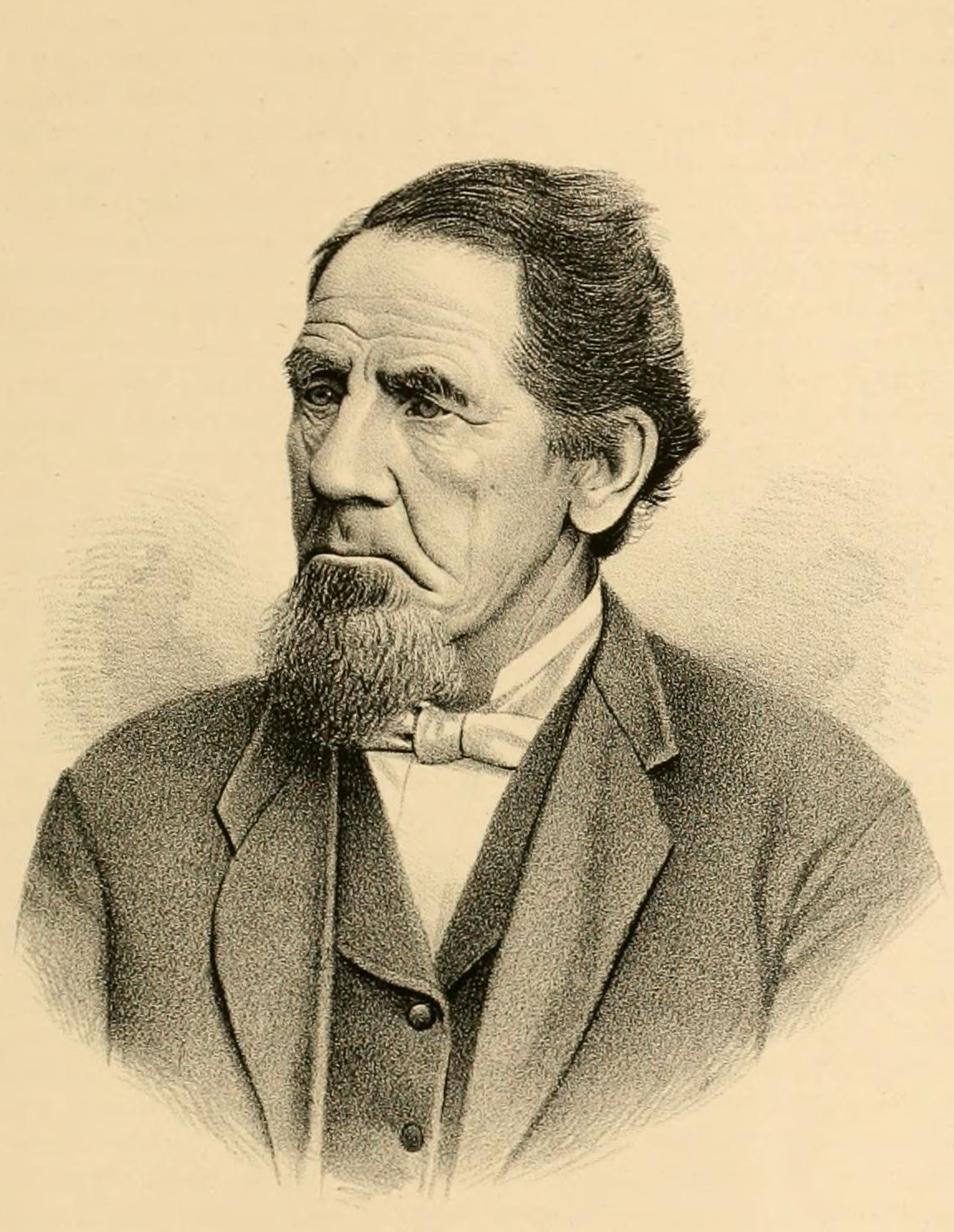
- Portrait from The History of Jefferson County, Wisconsin (1879)

Member of the Wisconsin State Assembly from the Jefferson 1st district
- In office January 1, 1866 – January 7, 1867
- Preceded by: Jonathan Piper
- Succeeded by: Thomas Shinnick
- In office January 1, 1855 – January 7, 1856
- Preceded by: Theodore Bernhardt
- Succeeded by: William Chappell
- In office January 3, 1853 – January 2, 1854
- Preceded by: Thomas R. Mott
- Succeeded by: Theodore Bernhardt
- In office January 6, 1851 – January 5, 1852
- Preceded by: Abram Vanderpool
- Succeeded by: Thomas R. Mott

Personal details
- Born: September 26, 1808 County Down, Ireland, UK
- Died: February 16, 1898 (aged 89) Watertown, Wisconsin, U.S.
- Resting place: Saint Bernards Catholic Cemetery, Watertown, Wisconsin
- Party: Democratic
- Spouse: Rose Crangle (m. 1846; died 1893)
- Children: Robert Emmett Rogan^{(b. 1847; died 1895)}; Rose L. Rogan^{(b. 1854; died 1945)}; Louis P. Rogan^{(b. 1858; died 1950)}; Ella Rogan^{(died 1942)}; Charles Eugene Rogan; Edwin B. Rogan

Patrick Rogan (September 26, 1808 – February 16, 1898) was an Irish American immigrant, businessman, Democratic politician, and pioneer of settler of Watertown, Wisconsin. He represented Watertown for four non-consecutive terms in the Wisconsin State Assembly (1851, 1853, 1855, 1866).

== Biography ==
Patrick Rogan was born in Rossglass, County Down, Ireland, in 1808. He had little formal education and emigrated with his parents to Montreal, Lower Canada, in 1823. While there he worked as an office boy and notary in a law office. They remained for two years in Montreal, then moved to Jefferson County, New York. In 1837, he came west to the Wisconsin Territory, settling at what is now Watertown, Wisconsin, on May 15 of that year.

He claimed a plot of land west of the river and cultivated a potato farm. In the 1840s he constructed a saw mill, and operated it until 1858, investing in new buildings, roads, and railroads in the growing city. He constructed the first brick building on the west side of the river, later owned by Watertown mayor Henry Mulberger.

Rogan was one of several settlers from Watertown, Jefferson County, New York. At the time when the Wisconsin Territory legislature voted to draw new counties, they successfully petitioned to name their county "Jefferson" and their settlement "Watertown". Rogan was appointed postmaster by President John Tyler in 1841, and served until 1849. He served as a town supervisor in Watertown before it was incorporated as a city, and subsequently served as an alderman and city assessor. He was also a member of the Jefferson County board of supervisors.

In 1846, he was elected as a delegate from Jefferson County to Wisconsin's first constitutional convention. The constitution from this convention was ultimately rejected by voters. A second constitution was approved in 1848. Running on the Democratic Party ticket, Rogan was elected to four non-consecutive terms in the Wisconsin State Assembly from Jefferson County's 1st Assembly district, serving in the 1851, 1853, 1855, and 1866 sessions.

He died at his home in Watertown, Wisconsin, in 1898.

== Family and legacy ==
Rogan's brother, James, was the first member of the family to settle at Watertown. Patrick arrived two months later. James Rogan also served as a lighthouse keeper at Milwaukee.

Patrick Rogan married Rose Crangle at Chicago, on January 17, 1846. Crangle was also a native of County Down, Ireland. They had six children together.

Rogan sold his farmstead in Watertown to Henry Bertram, who later sold it to the Congregation of Holy Cross at Notre Dame, which established Sacred Heart College on that land. The college still exists today as Maranatha Baptist University.

Wisconsin State Assembly
Preceded by Abram Vanderpool	Member of the Wisconsin State Assembly from the Jefferson 1st district January 6, 1851 – January 5, 1852	Succeeded by Thomas R. Mott
Preceded by Thomas R. Mott	Member of the Wisconsin State Assembly from the Jefferson 1st district January 3, 1853 – January 2, 1854	Succeeded by Theodore Bernhardt
Preceded by Theodore Bernhardt	Member of the Wisconsin State Assembly from the Jefferson 1st district January 1, 1855 – January 7, 1856	Succeeded by William Chappell
Preceded by Jonathan Piper	Member of the Wisconsin State Assembly from the Jefferson 1st district January 1, 1866 – January 7, 1867	Succeeded by Thomas Shinnick
