= Charlotte Paulsen =

German social reformer and women's rights activist

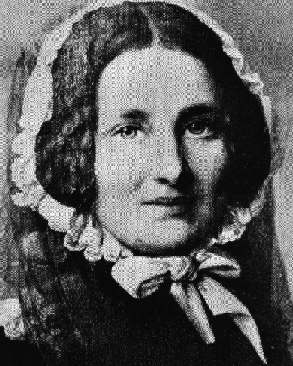

Charlotte Paulson (born Charlotte Thornton: 4 November 1797 (Note: Sources insist that her grave stone, which gives the year of her birth as 1798, is incorrect. She was born in 1797.) – 15 November 1862) was a German social reformer and women's rights activist, most notably as a pioneer of education for girls.

== Biography ==
=== Provenance. early years and family ===
Charlotte Thornton was the fourth of the fourteen children of the prosperous banker John Thornton (1764–1835) by his marriage to his second wife, born Maria Elisabeth Grupen. John Thornton's ancestors were from England, where he still had family connections. His wife came originally from Celle where her father's work involved, among other things, international finance between Hamburg and England. Charlotte's education came largely from governesses: she learned English, French, dancing, piano playing and the social accomplishments appropriate to her expected station in life. She herself would later recall that through her childhood she was spared from the sight of poverty and deprivation, unaware that more than half of her fellow Hamburg citizens lived on the edge of subsistence.

Hamburg was annexed by the French in 1810, becoming the administrative capital of a new department called Bouches-de-l'Elbe. Charlotte's family fell under suspicion because of her father's family and business connections to England, but they avoided deportation by handing over a large amount of money. In March 1813 the French withdrew from the city which was now occupied instead by the Russians. The Russian army of occupation was commanded by Colonel von Tettenborn, an aristocrat from the Rhineland who had been serving with he Russian army since 1812. The colonel had an adjutant called Lachmann who was billeted in Hamburg with the Thorntons. Still aged only fifteen, Charlotte fell in love with Lachmann and the two became engaged. Shortly after this John Thornton decided his daughter's fiancé was a bounder ("Hallodri"). According to one source the engagement was broken off. Almost immediately the Russian army withdrew from Hamburg, and the French occupation returned. By now the trade war between Napoleon and the British was intensifying, greatly damaging Hamburg's mercantile trade, and meaning that John Thornton's English connections placed him under greater suspicion than ever. The family fled to London where they undertook an extended stayed with relatives. Charlotte blossomed.

At the end of Summer in 1814, with Napoleon "safely out of the way", the Thorntons returned. Their wealth had been destroyed by Napoleon's trade wars, and they could no longer afford to live in Hamburg. They settled in Lübeck. On 18 August 1814, aged still not quite seventeen, Charlotte Thornton married the Hamburg estate agent Christian Paulsen, in compliance with her father's wishes. Twenty years older than she was, Paulsen was rather a dull fellow after all the admirers whose company she had enjoyed in London, but he was able to provide her with a relatively comfortable life. Although relatively little is known of him, he seems to have been a kindly and tolerant man with a strong social conscience: Charlotte was much changed by the marriage. Elisabeth, the couple's daughter, was born on 1 October 1815. Charlotte was an attentive and loving mother. She homeschooled Elisabeth herself, at the same time substantially expanding her own educational horizons. Like her mother, Elisabeth married young. In 1832, Elisabeth Paulsen married a pharmacist from Oldesloe called Julius Lorentzen.

Charlotte Paulsen frequently discussed the issues that concerned them both with her new son in law. Conservative leaders who imposed a return to their version of the old order at Vienna in 1814 and 1815 had not been able to bury the ideas of enlightenment humanity and rationalism which French revolutionary armies and the administrative genius of Napoleon had disseminated across Europe during the preceding 25 years. The 1830s might have been the age of Biedermeier, but this was also the decade of the "Vormärz". Régime change in Paris in 1830 was followed by a wave of protests across Germany. Julius Lorentzen instilled in Charlotte Paulsen a new awareness of democratic thoughts and ideas. Their discussions covered Theology, Philosophy and contemporary developments. But then Lorentzen died young, in 1837. Christian and Charlotte Paulsen now adopted a daughter, Marie Paulsen, and Charlotte engaged in her second daughter's education with the intensity that she had applied to the education of Elisabeth. Outside the house, politically conscious women were being caught up in civil protests and the programmes for liberal reform that were now emerging, together with demands for democratic rights for citizens, including women. Elisabeth Paulsen also felt under pressure that she, too, should be "doing more". Later she decided to set up the "Weiblichen Verein für Armen- und Krankenpflege" ("Women's Association for the Care of the Poor and Sick") which had been set up in Hamburg by the formidably energetic Amalie Sieveking in 1832, as a response to the Cholera epidemic of that year. However, Sieveking rejected her approaches, finding Paulsen too much of a "free thinker". It grated with Sieveking that even if Paulsen's motives were honorable, humanist and rational, they seemed not to be overwhelmingly Christian.

=== Social engagement ===
In the end, Charlotte Paulsen joined the Hamburg based women's association, "Zur Brudertreue an der Elbe". Soon after that, in 1848, she also joined the "Deutschkatholische Gemeinde" ("German Catholic Community"). This was a non-denominational association. Members sought to practice their Christianity according to basic democratic principles, applying complete equality of voting power for all members, especially through the participation of women, and without the constraints imposed by association with one or other of the different church denominations. Others involved included Bertha Ronge, the three sisters Goldschmidt sisters and Emilie Wüstenfeld, with whom Paulsen developed a particularly close friendship and working relationship.

After the perceived failure in Germany of the 1848 revolution the women decided that their priority should be the creation of a new liberated generation through education. Back in 1840 the educational philosopher and pioneer Friedrich Fröbel had coined the word "Kindergarten" (loosely a "garden for cultivating children like plants in a garden"), and called upon women in Germany to take inspiration from his experimental "play and activity" establishment in Bad Blankenburg and set up similar institutions across Germany. Charlotte Paulsen was far from unique in responding to these promptings. The Kindergarten movement was backed particularly strongly both by those advocating democratic structures for Germany and among middle-class women who saw the education of very young children as hugely important. During this period many so-called "Bewahrschulen" (loosely, "looking after schools") and "Kindertagesheime" ("Children's Day Homes") were established.

Additionally, in March 1849 Charlotte Paulsen founded the "Weiblichen Verein für Armen- und Krankenpflege" ("Women's Association for the Care of the Poor and Sick"). Prosperity had returned to Hamburg and she was able to collect money from well-to-do city folk with which she was able to pay for impoverished couples to get married, look after the sick and newly married by providing them with soup and finding them jobs. However, she had somehow made a particular enemy of Amalie Sieveking who thought her an immoral unbeliever, and shared the opinion. (Note: Amalie Sieveking disapproved of Charlotte Paulsen on religious grounds: * "Eine Freidenkerin, die rationalistischen Ideen anhing, die nicht an erster Stelle die Armen auf den christlichen Glauben verpflichten, sondern ihnen auf gleicher Ebene begegnen wollte, war für den christlichen Verein als Mitarbeiterin unannehmbar." (Inge Grolle: "Auch Frauen seien zulässig" * "A free thinker who sticks to reasoned ideas which do not require the poor to adhere to Christian belief as a starting point [for receiving help], but wants to deal with them on their own level. For the Christian association [which Sieveking ran] this made her unacceptable as an employee." Amalie Sieveking quoted by Inge Grolle)

At a time when there was no blanket schooling obligation in Hamburg, Paulsen and her colleagues set about creating a school of their own, in order to give poor children the chance of going to school after they were too old for Kindergarten. They taught children in groups of more than twenty at a time, but they were banned from this activity shortly afterwards because they had not obtained a teaching permit. However, based on a law dating back to 1732, it was established that homeschooling required no permit, as long as no more than twelve children were taught at a time. The women now pursued their educational project with smaller groups, using suitably sized rooms in the homes of the more relatively well-to-to backers. They continued to attract hostility from the authorities because they did not expressly each religion as part of the curriculum, but responded by insisting on the importance of inter-denominational "confessional independence", able to accommodate children from Catholic, Protestant and Jewish families. After further wrangling, they managed to find and recruit a qualified teacher with the necessary teaching permit and in 1856 opened a "proper" school, centrally located in Hamburg, which at the outset welcomed sixty pupils.

Charlotte Paulsen now devoted her life unstintingly to her association for the care of the poor and sick, while campaigning with increasing urgency for religious and political freedom, and advocating women's emancipation. After her husband died her financial resources became exhausted. For some time she lived with the children in the care centre, before moving into a little apartment of her own in Hamburg-Mundsburg. Dressed in simple clothes, she became a familiar sight on the city streets, helping the poor and others in need. After she died in 1862 she was buried in a simple coffin in the St. Gertrude church yard.

Charlotte Paulsen's ambition that pre-school children and school-age children should be educated in a single establishment was realised only after her death: the institution opened on 3 November 1866, bearing the name "Paulsenstift" as a tribute to Charlotte Paulsen. It was subsequently destroyed by bombing in 1943 and then reconfigured and relaunched in 1945 as the Charlotte-Paulsen-Gymnasium (secondary school).
