= Amalie Sieveking =

German philanthropist and social activist

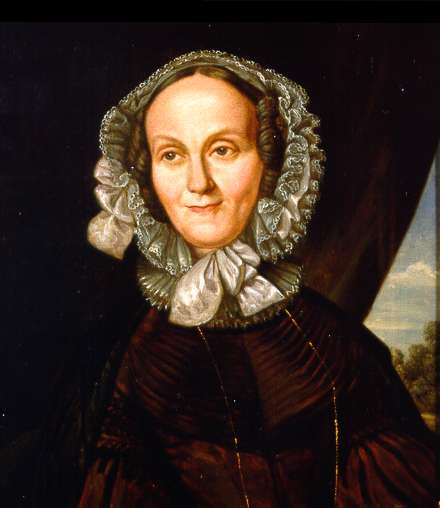
Amalie Sieveking (1841), painting by Hans Heinrich Port

Amalie Wilhelmine Sieveking (25 July 1794 – 1 April 1859) was a German philanthropist and social activist who founded the Weiblicher Verein für Armen- und Krankenpflege (Women's association for the care of the poor and invalids). She initiated employment and practical training for the poor, and promoted the building of affordable housing and hospitals. She is regarded as a forerunner of modern German social work.

== Biography ==
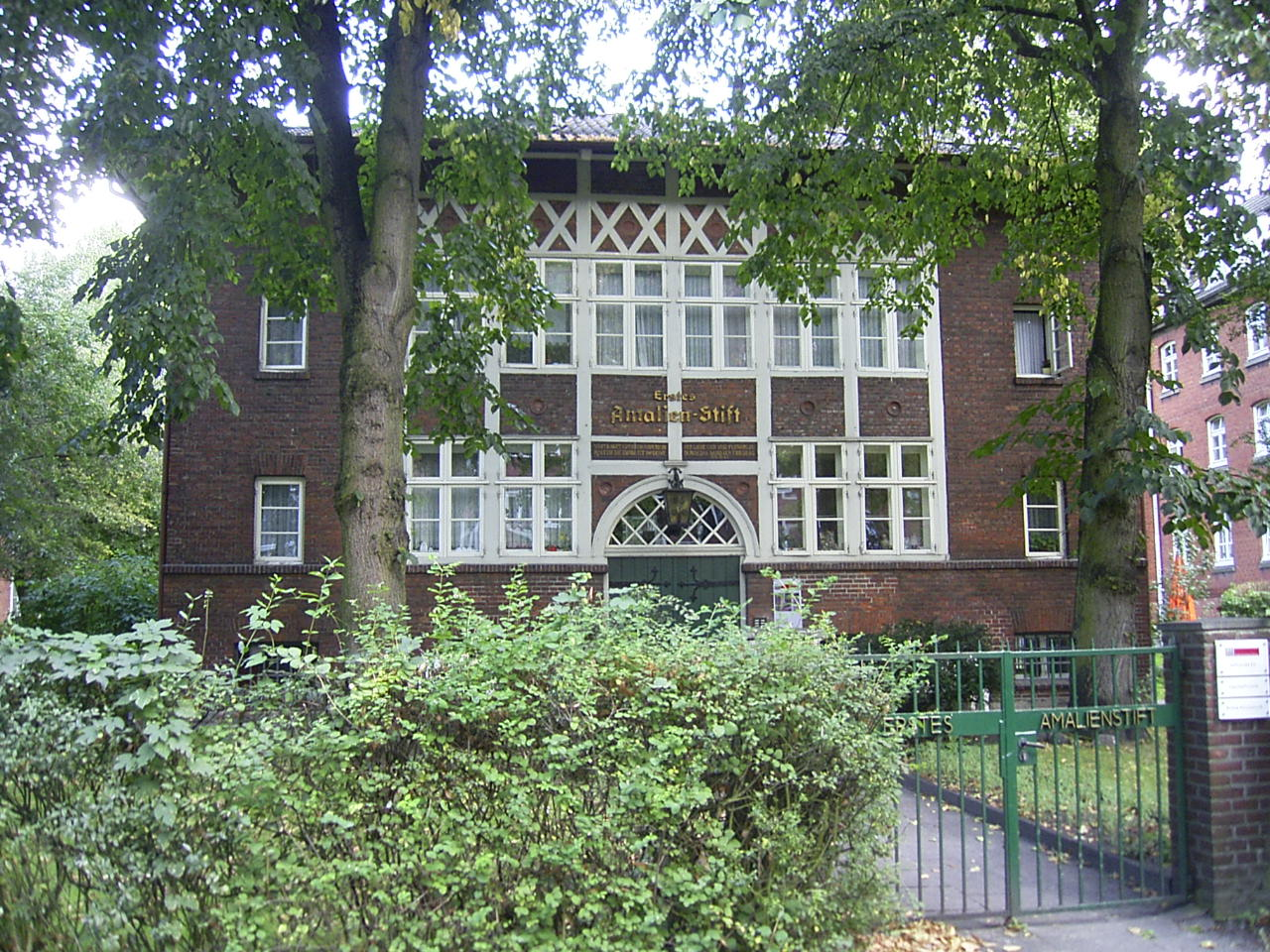
First society established by Amalie Sieveking, Stiftstraße 65, St. Georg, Hamburg

Amalie Sieveking was born in Hamburg, the daughter of the Hamburg senator Heinrich Christian Sieveking (died 1809) and his wife Caroline Louise, née Volkmann (died 1799); her grandfather was also a senator. After her father's death she was taken in by her uncle's family, supported by a small senatorial pension, and cared for their invalid son. She took up the education of her nieces, and founded a school for girls, many of whom eventually became tutors to prominent families. She also taught girls in poorhouses on Sundays.

The Free churches (Protestant religious bodies in each country) served as an inspiration to German Lutherans to further the care of the sick, and led to the first involvement of German Protestant women in charitable work. While Sieveking's early education was shaped by the Enlightenment, after her confirmation and the death of her brother she turned toward the Christian revival that was sweeping Germany, and came under the influence of popular theologians such as Johann Hinrich Wichern, Johann Wilhelm Rautenberg, and Matthias Claudius. Particularly Rautenberg, who had made St. Georg, Hamburg a center of new piety, was of great influence in steering Sieveking (and others, including Wichern and Heinrich Matthias Sengelmann) towards charitable work and making her a deaconess.

Sieveking decided as early as 18 to remain single, and vowed to create a religious order of charitable sisters. When cholera broke out in Hamburg in 1831, she volunteered to work as a nurse in the poorhouses. She advertised for other high-ranking women to join her, but none did, so she went alone. Soon she found herself in charge of the nursing staff. On May 23, 1832, with twelve other women, instead of a religious society she founded the Weiblicher Verein für Armen- und Krankenpflege, a pioneering diaconal benevolent society that aimed to help people help themselves by providing "material and spiritual assistance" to impoverished sick people and their families. Workers were enjoined to preserve the dignity of those they helped, and to assist with clothing and food. The head of the society was to be elected annually. Sieveking rejected any suggestion that a male head was required. Regarding charity work for women, she noted: "In a great many cases, namely those of the upper class, household and other domestic responsibilities do not offer the female side of the family a sufficient arena for the sum of their energies." In 1840, she founded the Amalienstift, which had a children's hospital and a poorhouse. She stated her goal as: "To me, at least as important were the benefits which [work with the poor] seemed to promise for those of my sisters who would join me in such a work of charity. The higher interest of my sex were close to my heart". Her organization inspired others of a similar nature in Germany, and over the next sixteen years 45 societies were established affiliated with Sieveking's. These societies provided an opportunity to women of higher echelons of society to help in diaconal work without being designated as deaconesses. Already in 1840 Sieveking had declined the position of a superintendent of the Bethanien hospital in Berlin, offered to her by Pastor Fliedner of Kaiserswerth.

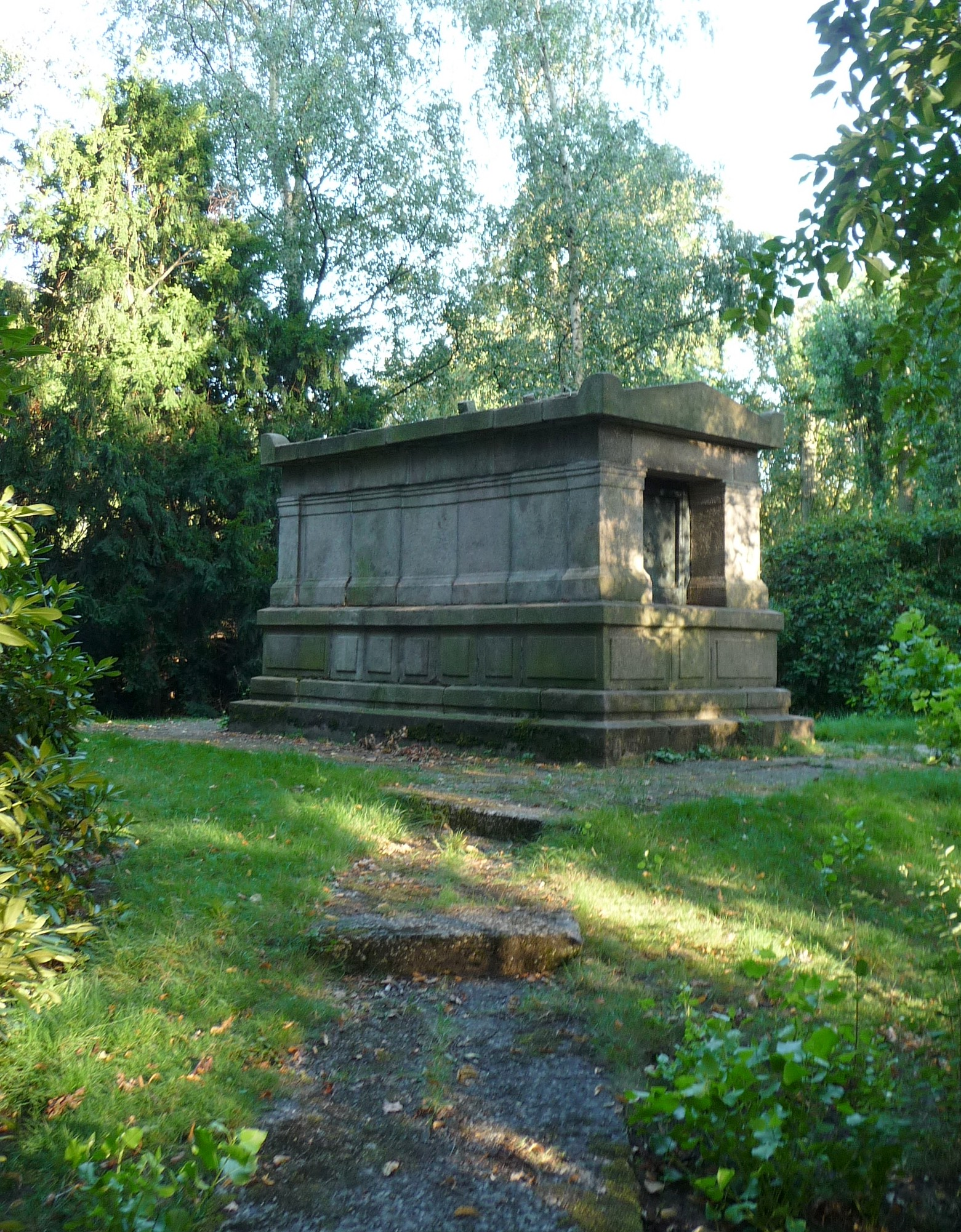
Sieveking Mausoleum in the Old Cemetery in Hamburg-Hamm

In 1836, Theodor Fliedner was influenced by Sieveking when he established the first Protestant hospital in Kaiserswerth, which evolved into a leading modern nursing school. He was also responsible for establishing the deaconesses in Germany, as an order of nurses which attracted widespread enrollment and recognition. Florence Nightingale, the British nurse of Crimean War fame, was trained at Kaiserswerth and was influenced by the work of Sieveking. She probably met Sieveking in London through her friend Christian von Bunsen. Nightingale made nursing a profession of trained middle-class "women in white".

A very pious person, Sieveking anonymously published tracts, Betrachtungen (Observations) and Beschäftigungen mit der heiligen Schrift (Considerations on Holy Writ). She described herself as a "rationalist mystic". She was influenced in her theology by August Hermann Francke; while she showed solidarity with those on the margins of society, she did not show any political support for class reform.

Sieveking lived off the senatorial pension and two small inheritances, and maintained her independence. After her death her work was continued by her friend Elise Averdieck (1808-1907). Her autobiography, titled Hanseatic Philanthropist, was reviewed by the poet Sophie Schwab, who found a "delightful resonance" in its Christian spirit.

She died in Hamburg and is interred in the old Hamm cemetery at the Dreifaltigkeitskirche (Trinity Church) in Hamburg-Hamm, in a mausoleum for the Sieveking and Chapeaurouge families that was built by her cousin Karl Sieveking and designed by architect Alexis de Chateauneuf.

== Legacy ==
Her feastday in the Lutheran Calendar of Saints is April 1.

The Amalie Sieveking Hospital in Hamburg-Volksdorf is named for her; today it is part of the Albertinen-Diakoniewerk in Hamburg.

The Amalie-Sieveking-Haus in Radebeul, Saxony, houses a home for the elderly as well as the Saxon Diaconate.

== Bibliography ==
- Duiker, William; Spielvogel, Jackson (3 January 2006). World History, Volume II: Since 1500. Cengage Learning. ISBN 0-495-05054-7.
- Green, Todd H. (7 February 2011). Responding to Secularization: The Deaconess Movement in Nineteenth-Century Sweden. BRILL. ISBN 978-90-04-19479-3.
- Maischak, Lars (29 April 2013). German Merchants in the Nineteenth-Century Atlantic. Cambridge University Press. ISBN 978-1-107-01729-0.
- Meade, Teresa A.; Wiesner-Hanks, Merry E. (15 April 2008). A Companion to Gender History. John Wiley & Sons. ISBN 978-0-470-69282-0.
- Nightingale, Florence; Calabria, Michael D. (1997). Florence Nightingale in Egypt and Greece: Her Diary and "Visions". SUNY Press. ISBN 978-0-7914-3116-0.
