= Octagon House (Watertown, Wisconsin) =

Historic house in Wisconsin, United States

- U.S. National Register of Historic Places
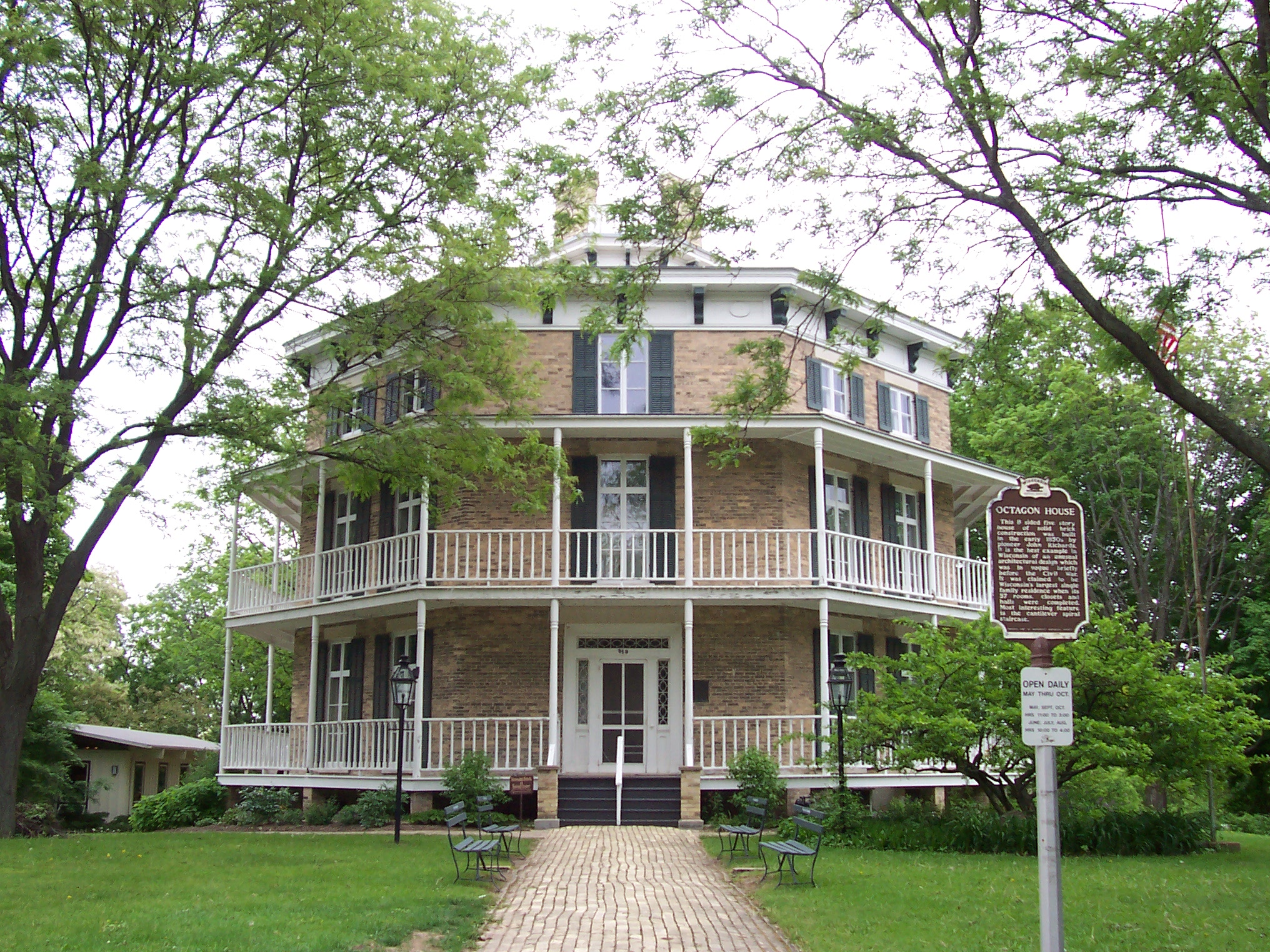

- Location within Wisconsin Location within the United States
- Interactive map showing the location of Octagon House
- Location: 919 Charles St., Watertown, Wisconsin
- Coordinates: 43°11′5.03″N 88°42′27.31″W
- Built: 1853
- Architect: Richards, John
- Architectural style: Octagon Mode
- NRHP reference No.: 71000039
- Added to NRHP: November 23, 1971

The Octagon House in Watertown, Wisconsin, also known as the Octagon House Museum or the John Richards Octagon House, was built in 1854 and was listed on the National Register of Historic Places in 1971. It is one of many octagon houses built in the United States in the mid-19th century. In 1950 architect Rexford Newcomb wrote, "...probably the best-planned octagon house in the country is the John Richards House at Watertown, Wisconsin..." The house has been carefully restored and is open to the public as a museum.

== History ==
The house was designed and built by John Richards, a pioneer Watertown lawyer and mill owner, with construction completed in 1854. Richards came to Wisconsin in 1836 and operated a grist mill across Rock River from this house. He was later appointed the first district attorney of Jefferson County and was elected justice of the peace and mayor of Watertown. In 1840 he married Eliza Forbes of Massachusetts, reportedly promising to build her the finest house in the best town in Wisconsin Territory.

It was in the Richards family until the death of his grandson, William Thomas, in 1935. The family offered to sell the house to the city (reputedly for $1), but it was sold to the Watertown Historical Society (founded 1933) and opened to the public in 1938. The house is still a museum open to the public. The house is located within the Richards Hill Residential Historic District. Descendants of the Richards family hosted a 150th anniversary celebration in 2004.

== Construction and innovations ==
The house is three stories and is built on 17-inch-thick (430 mm) stone foundations, with external walls of brickwork 13 inches (330 mm) thick. It is 50 feet (15 m) across excluding the balconies. It has eight square rooms on each floor and triangular rooms in the corners, a total of 32 rooms including the cupola.

Timber-constructed verandas 4-foot-8-inch (1.42 m) wide are all round at the first and second levels. They are part of the original design, but by 1924 they were so rotten as to be dangerous, and Richards' daughter had them taken down. For many years visitors could only imagine the house with its porches by referring to a scale model of the house, which sits in the grass next to the house. The verandas were reconstructed in 1978 at a cost of $50,000. By 2006 they were again in a dangerous condition, and an anonymous donation enabled them to be restored once more.

The central square is made up of two 4-inch (100 mm) leaves of brickwork with a 4-inch (100 mm) cavity, which is used for chimney flues and warm air ducting, to heat rooms without fireplaces. The double wall eliminates the need for projecting chimney breasts. The battlement effect at the top of the cupola is actually the four chimneys. The house has a flat roof, sloping gently towards the center. Rainwater from the roof was collected in a reservoir at the third level, and overflows into a cistern next to the kitchen in the basement.

Inside the house at the center a hanging spiral staircase connects the floors. Its rail and spindles are of cherry wood, taken from trees on Richards' land. The staircase is built into the four chimney flues. There is also a servants' staircase. Richards built a passive air conditioning system into the house, with air intakes below the eaves, ducts in the brick walls, and outlets in the major rooms. A furnace in the basement heats water, and warm air is ducted into the twelve main rooms, i.e. those adjoining the central square.

Publications regularly state the house has 57 rooms; however this includes every closet and passage. The number of habitable rooms is 29, including the octagonal room in the cupola. Despite having 15 bedrooms there is just a single bathroom.

=== Architectural style ===
The house was inspired by Orson Squire Fowler's 1848 book, The Octagon House: A Home For All, or A New, Cheap, Convenient, and Superior Mode of Building and is a good example of his theories put into practice. Features which are directly linked to his ideas (apart from the octagonal plan) are the central spiral staircase, symmetrical arrangement of rooms with interconnecting doors, the verandas running all round the building, and the flat roof surmounted by a cupola. In accordance with Fowler's theories, the detailing is relatively plain for the period. Openings are simply framed by moldings. The covered verandas lack excess detail, having modest turned balustrade spindles and supporting posts. The decorative effect of the house comes from the basic design features: the octagonal shape and the external verandas.

There are four generously sized rooms on each floor, nearly 18 foot square, with connecting doors all round. The subsidiary rooms are less satisfactory, being triangular. The arrangement of rooms is rigidly the same on all floors because the partition walls are of 9-inch (230 mm) brickwork, so they must stack one above the other. The central spiral stair is compact but leaves one side of the house without direct access to the landings, so there are bedrooms only accessible through another bedroom—in the worst case, through two other bedrooms. Fowler's own house had external staircases and the verandas were used for circulation and access to the rooms.

=== Record drawings ===
Below are drawings of the Watertown Octagon House dated March 28, 1935, prepared by the Historic American Buildings Survey. At that time the verandas were missing, removed when they became dangerously rotten. The survey drawings are a reconstruction of the house as it was originally built.

== Gallery ==
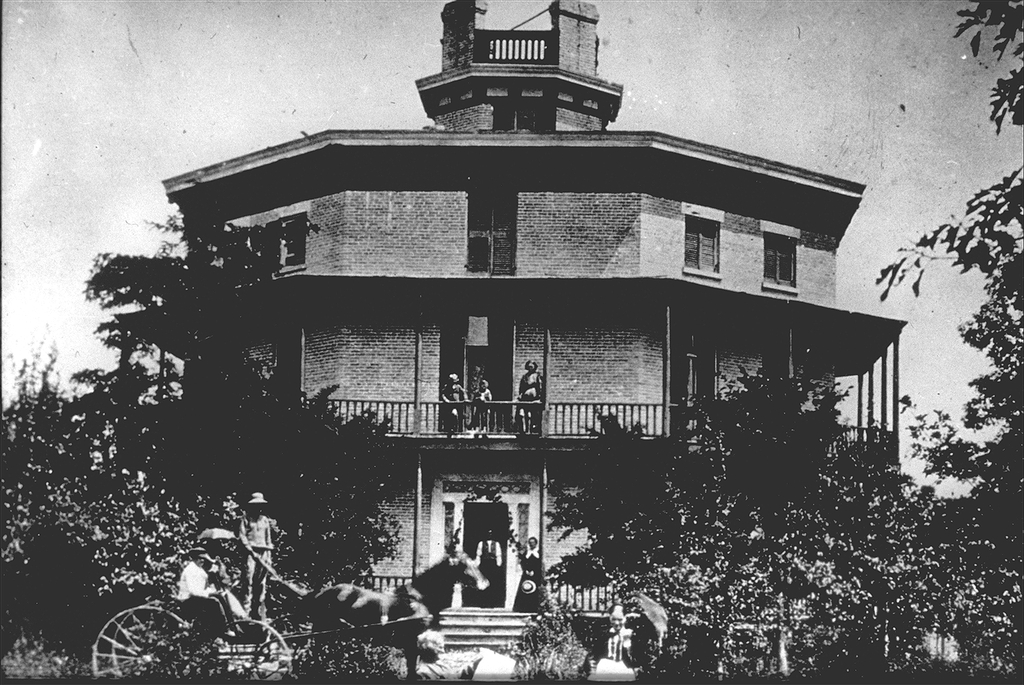
The Watertown Octagon House in 1933

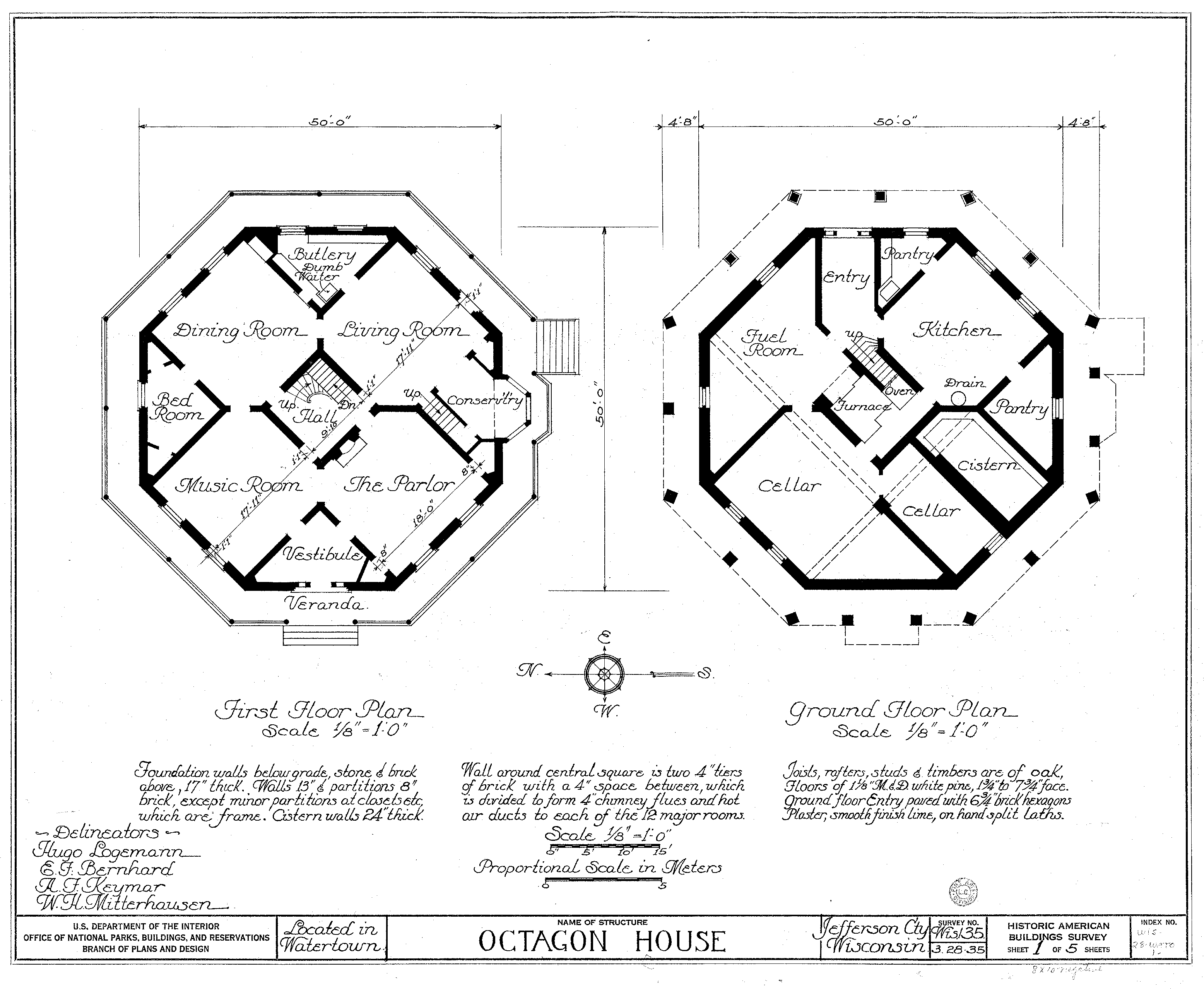

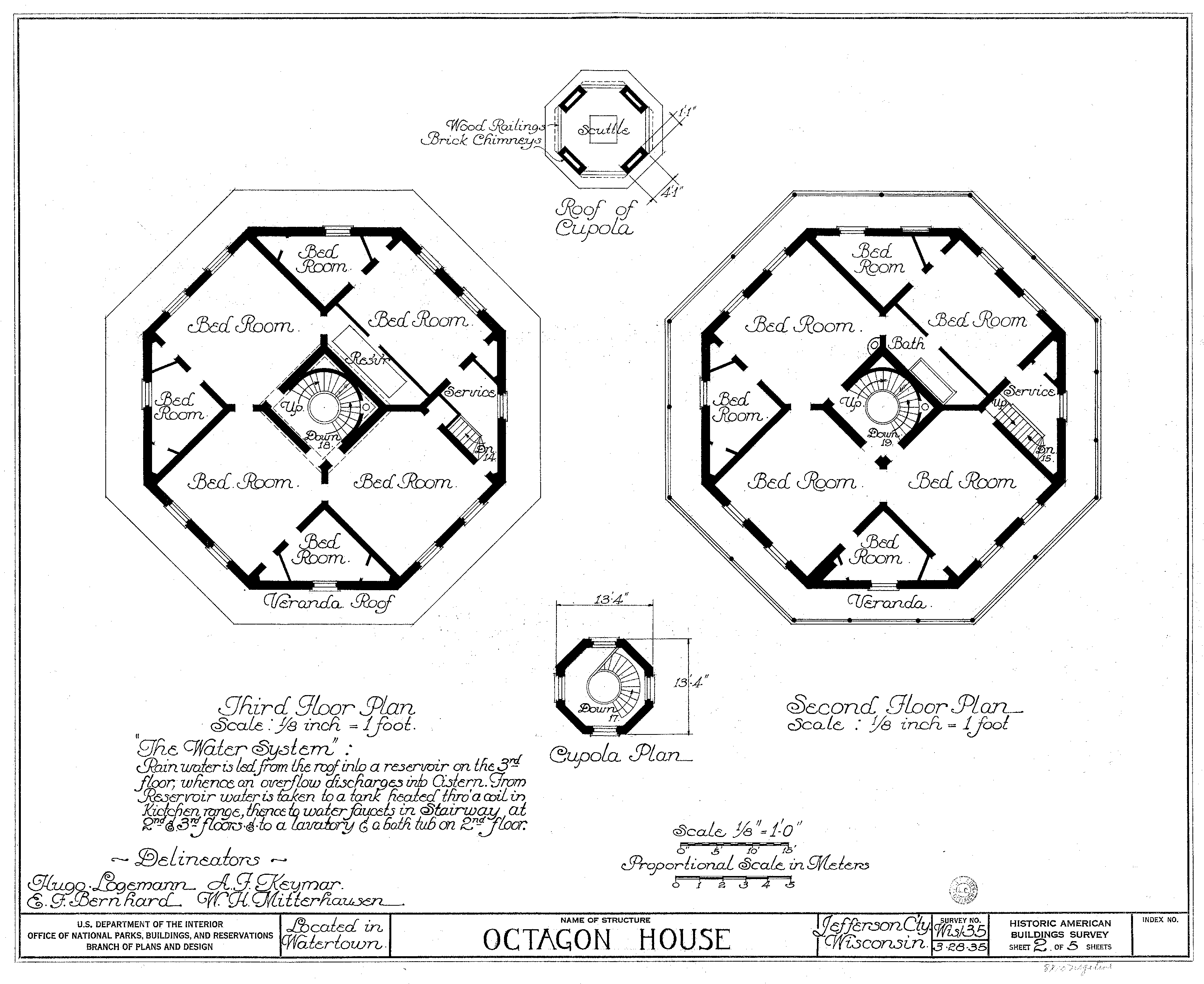

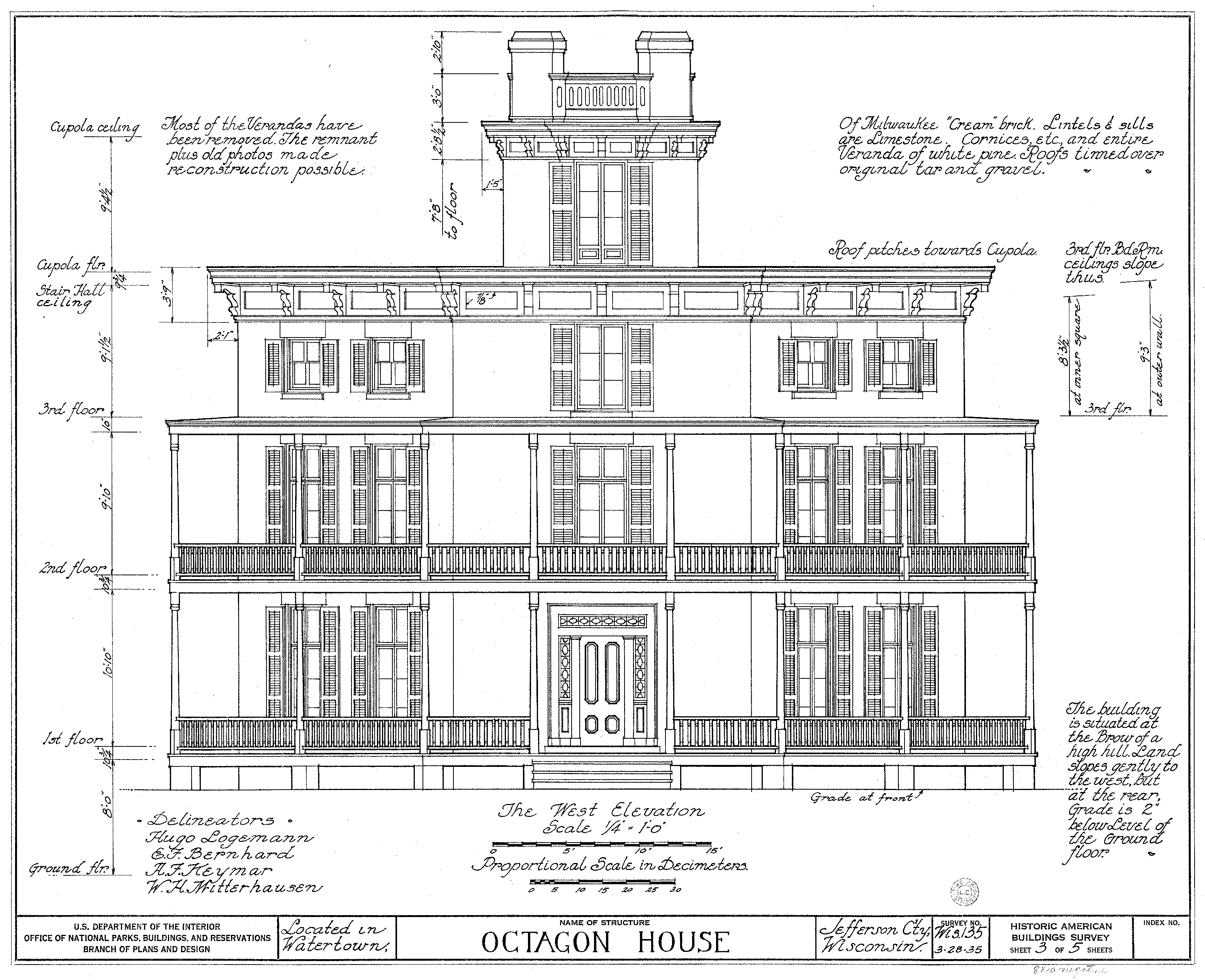

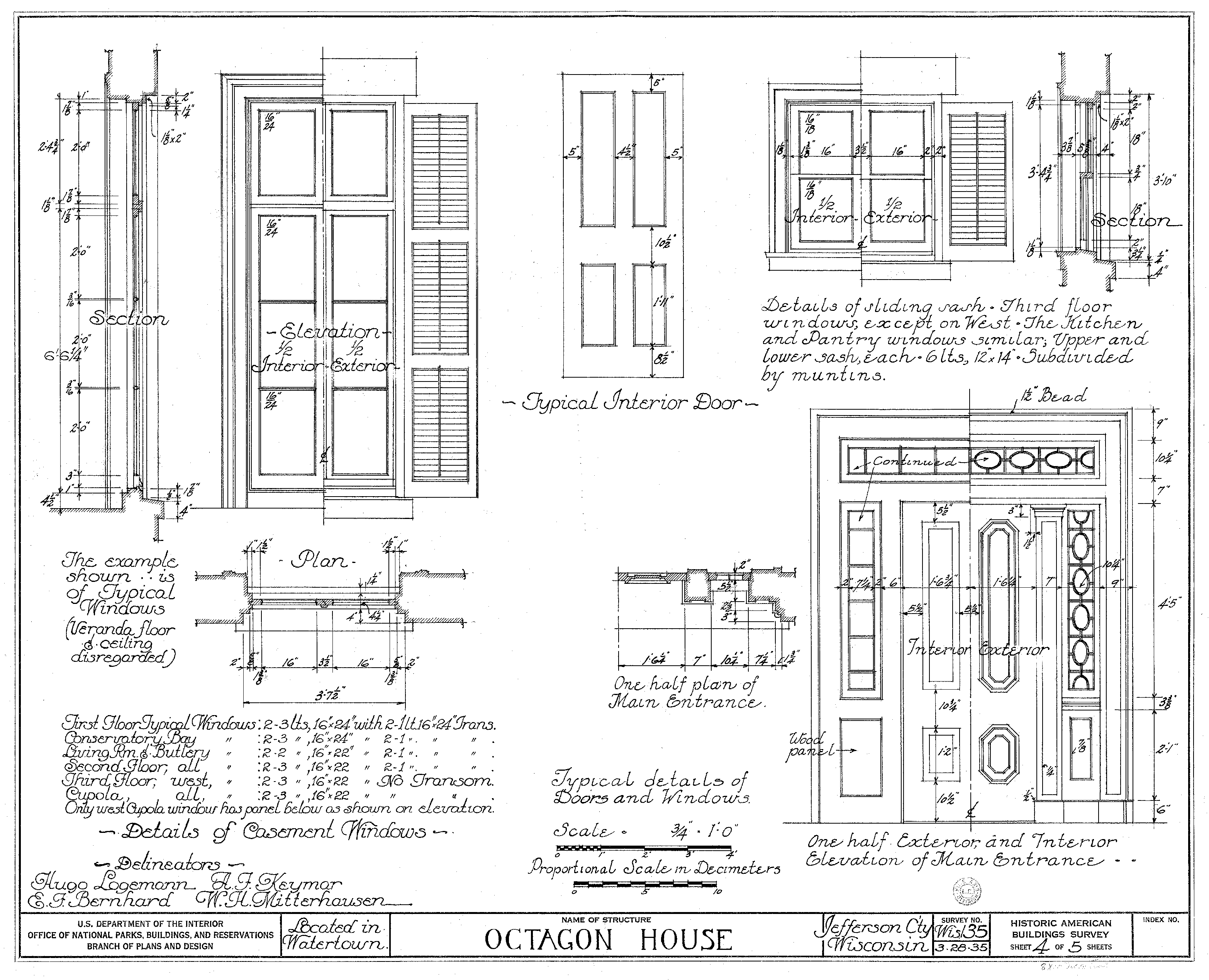

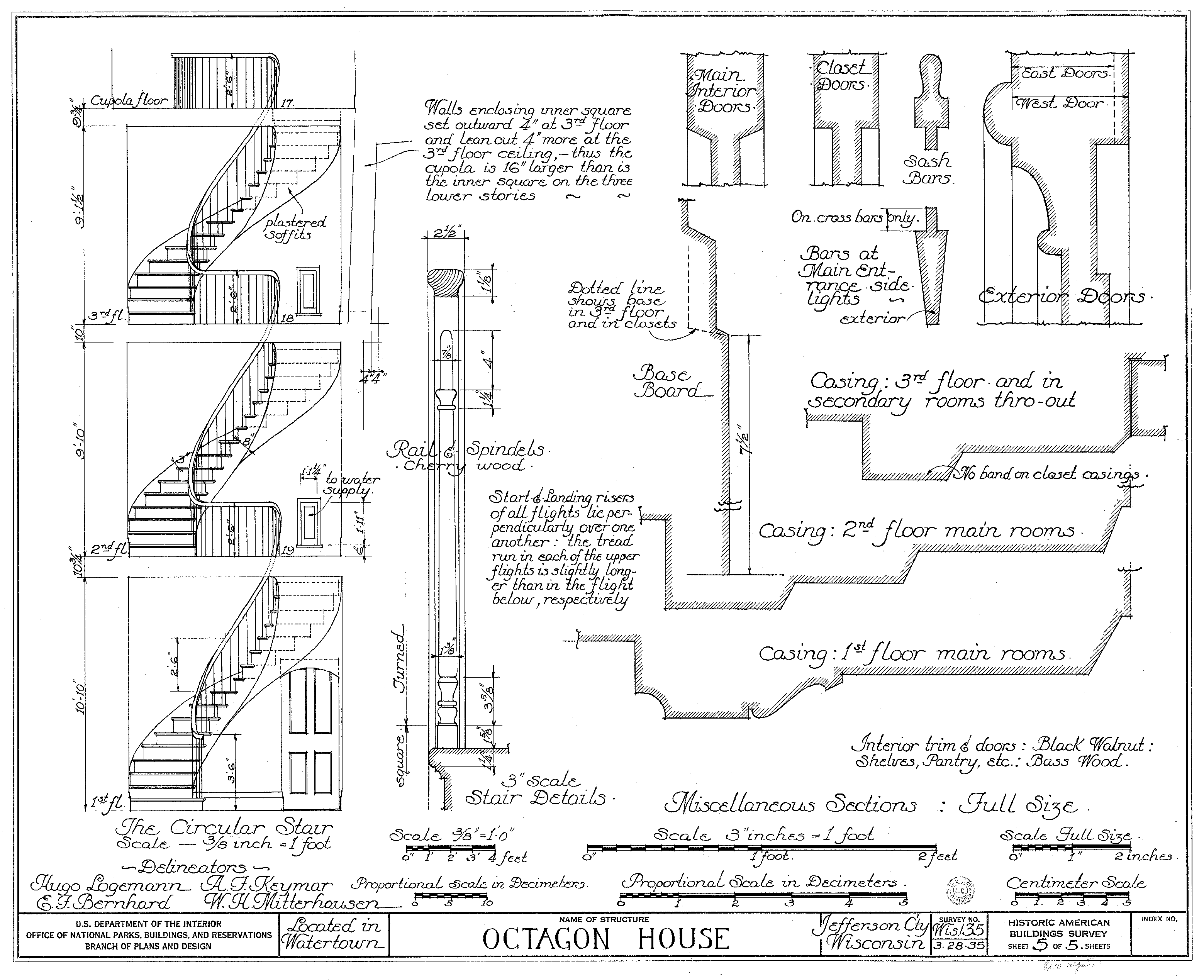

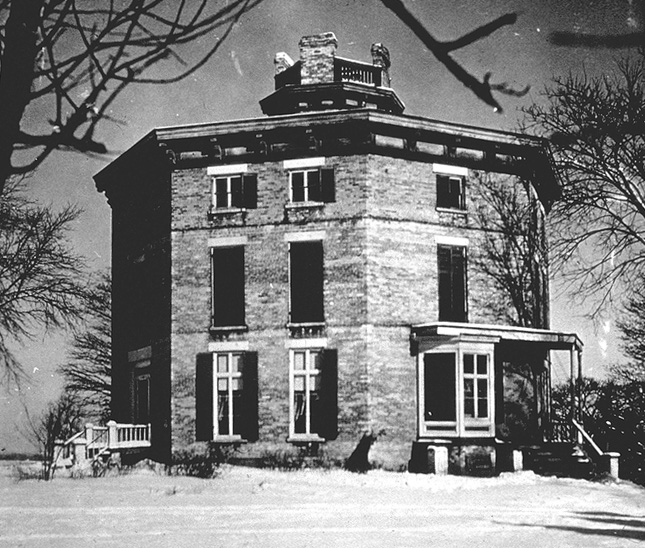

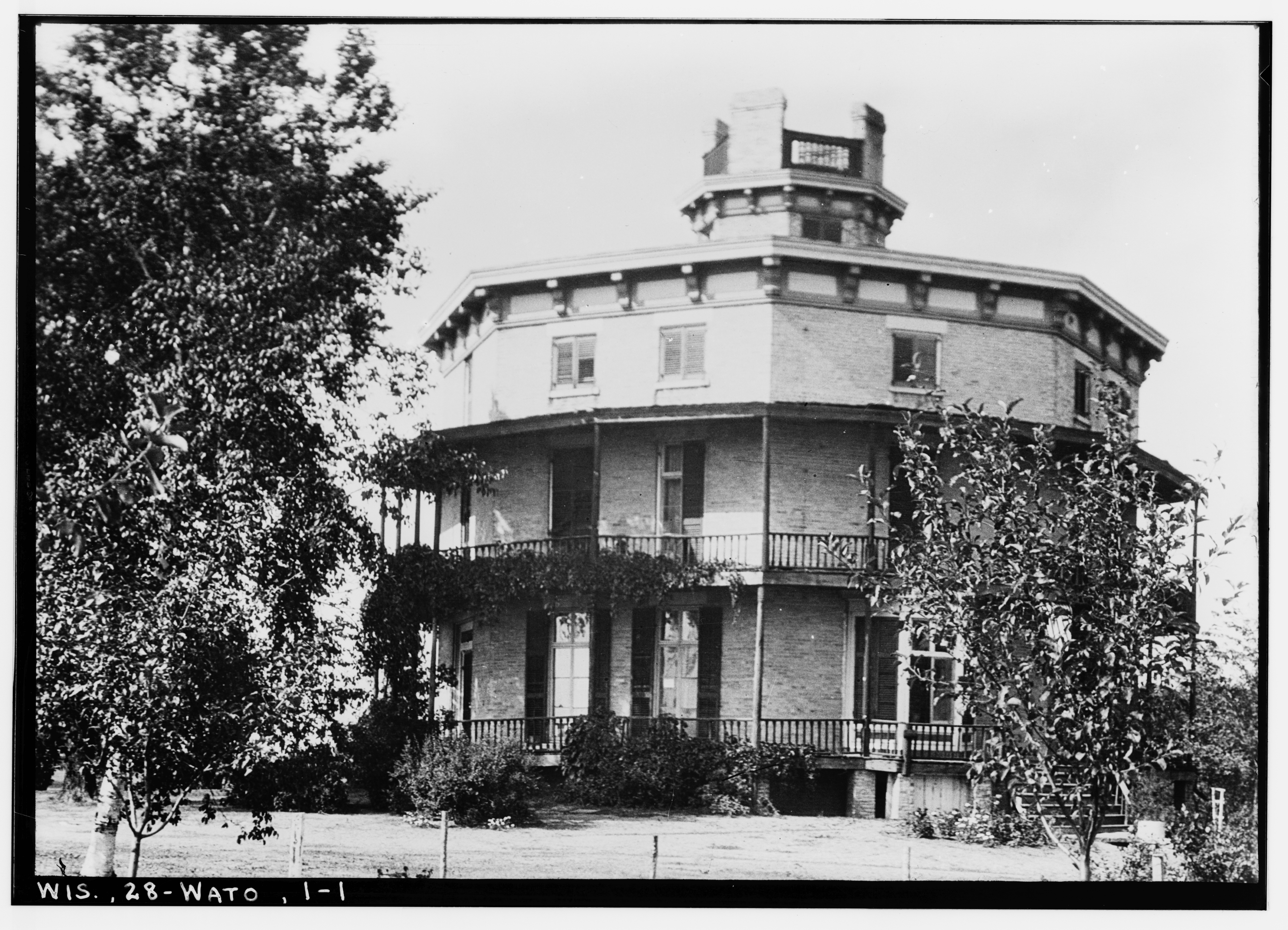

== See also ==
- List of octagon houses
- First Kindergarten, the first kindergarten in the United States, located on the same grounds as the Octagon House.
