= Charles Beckman (politician) =

American farmer and politician

Charles Beckman (August 16, 1813 – January 9, 1892) was an American farmer and politician from Watertown, Wisconsin, who held a number of public offices, from mayor to member of the Wisconsin State Assembly.

== Background ==
Beckman was born in Goershagen, Pomerania, Brandenburg-Prussia on August 16, 1813. He received a common school education, and became a farmer. On October 31, 1839, he married Hannah Charlotte Knuth, like him a native of Prussia; they were to have seven children. They came to the U. S. in September 1843, settling first in Buffalo, New York. Beckman taught school in Western New York until they came to Wisconsin Territory in 1845, initially settling in Emmet, in Dodge County near Watertown.

== Politics and public offices ==
Beckman was a Democratic Party member, serving on the resolutions committee of the 1861 Dodge County Democratic convention which denounced secession and sectionalism, and denounced the Radical Republicans as sectionalists, calling instead for "a union of all conservative men" to fight alike the secessionists and the Republicans.

When elected to the Assembly in 1873, Beckman had been Dodge County coroner for two terms; a county supervisor for three years; an alderman for eight years; a school commissioner for two years; city treasurer and city clerk; "Commissioner of the Public Debt"; assessor for six years; a justice of the peace for nineteen years; and had been mayor of the city of Watertown in 1868.

He was elected to the assembly's 1st Jefferson County district (which included the Towns of Ixonia and Watertown as well as the entire City of Watertown, including those two wards which actually were in Dodge County) as an independent candidate, receiving 834 votes to 753 for Democratic incumbent Patrick Devy. When the legislature convened, he declared himself a "Reform Democrat" and appears to have joined with the Reform Party, a short-lived coalition of Democrats, reform and Liberal Republicans, and Grangers formed in 1873 which had secured the election of a Governor of Wisconsin and a number of state legislators. He declared his occupation to be "justice of the peace"; and was assigned to the standing committee on incorporations. He was not a candidate for re-election in 1874, and was succeeded by fellow Reformer Christian Mayer, also a former mayor of Watertown.

== After the Assembly ==
When in 1875 a Watertown Encampment of the Independent Order of Odd Fellows was organized, Beckman was elected to be its "High Priest", a position apparently second only to the "Grand Patriarch" of that body. He continued to be elected to various offices of the City of Watertown, such as Assessor and City Clerk.

He died January 9, 1892, in Watertown of "general debility", leaving a widow and three children. As of that date, he had been a justice of the peace for all but four of the years since 1853.
