= First Kindergarten =

- U.S. National Register of Historic Places
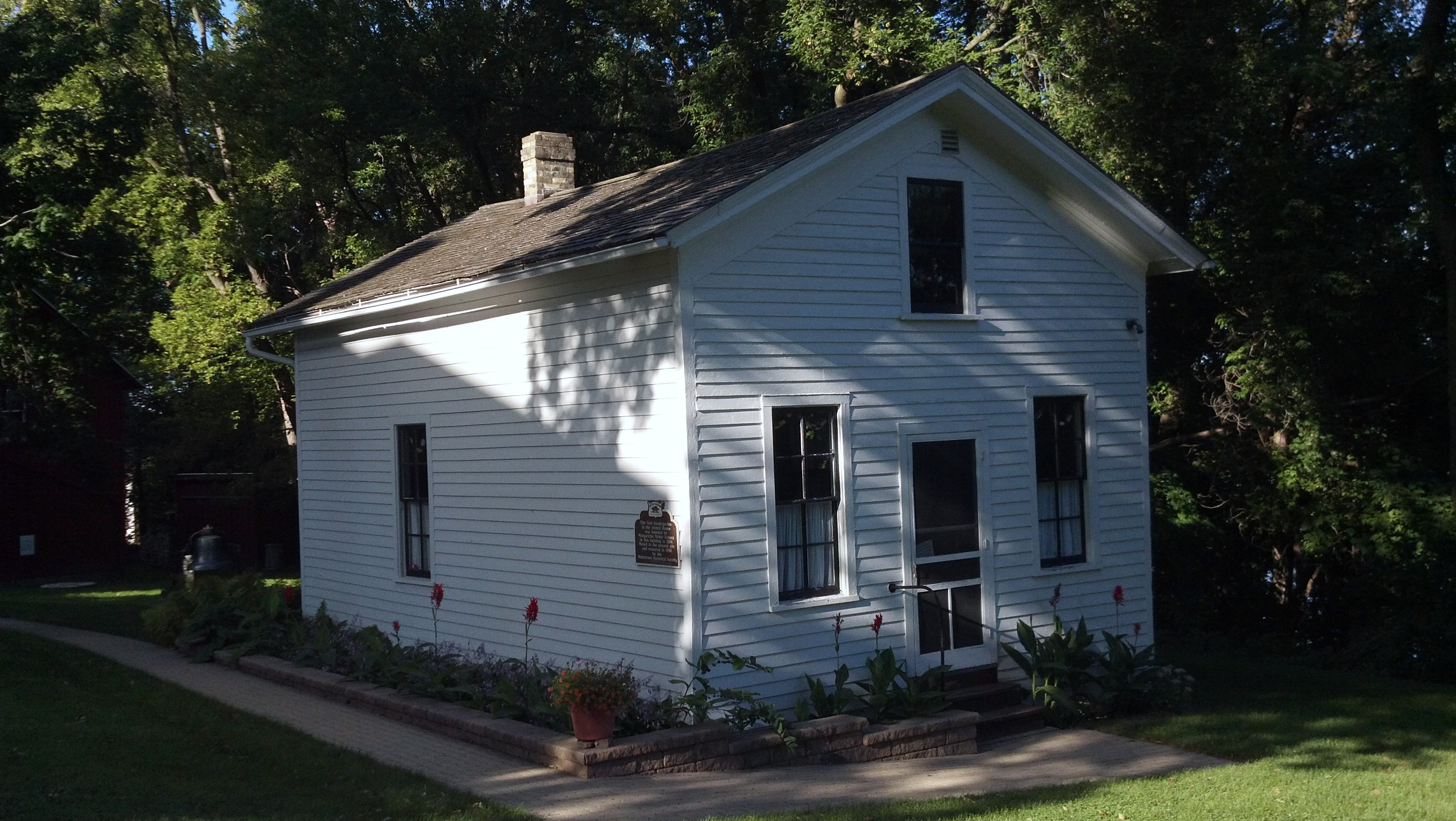

- Location within Wisconsin
- Location: 919 Charles St. Watertown, Wisconsin
- Coordinates: 43°11′04″N 88°42′26″W
- NRHP reference No.: 72000055
- Added to NRHP: February 23, 1972

The First Kindergarten in Watertown, Wisconsin, is the building that housed the first kindergarten in the United States, opened in 1856. It was added to the National Register of Historic Places in 1972 for its significance to the history of education.

== History ==
Margarethe Schurz (née Meyer) was born in Hamburg, Germany, and at age sixteen listened to a series of lectures from the German educator Friedrich Fröbel. In that time and place, young children were often viewed as little beasts to be tamed so that they could become productive workers. Fröbel instead saw natural curiosity in children, which he encouraged with play, carefully chosen toys, music, stories, and nature study. He compared children to plants and a teacher to the gardener who helps them grow and bloom - hence the "garden of children."

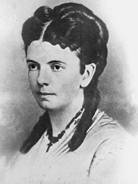
Margarethe Meyer Schurz

Margarethe's family was prosperous and socially progressive, favoring the unification of the many small German states into one democratic nation. After losing in the revolutions of 1848-49, some of the family left Germany. In London, Margarethe's sister started a kindergarten, and Margarethe helped, gaining experience. There she married Carl Schurz, a fellow exile who fled Germany after serving as an officer on the losing side in the revolutions. They immigrated to the U.S. in 1852, and in 1856 moved to Watertown.

By this time Margarethe had a three-year-old daughter Agathe, and she started a kindergarten in her home for her daughter and four cousins, conducting classes in German. Soon others wanted the same for their children, so she expanded and moved her kindergarten to a small building in town. That building is the subject of this article, and it housed the first kindergarten in the U.S. It was a one-room schoolhouse. Margarethe directed the kindergarten until 1858, when the Schurzes moved to Milwaukee. Carl became a lawyer, a Republican, a key supporter of Lincoln among German-Americans, a major general in the Union Army during the Civil War, and United States Secretary of the Interior.

After the Schurzes left, the Watertown kindergarten operated sporadically until the First World War, when it closed due to suspicion of all things German. The school building is a simple 1.5 stories with boxed cornices and clapboard siding, 18 by 24 feet. In the years after it was a school, it served various uses: cigar factory, fish store, and religious book store. While it was a store, the front was substantially altered. In 1956 it was threatened with demolition, and the Watertown Historical Society moved the structure from its original location on North Second St. to its current site alongside the Octagon House and began to restore it as the kindergarten building. The building now serves as a museum.

The Schurz home, in which Margarethe began her kindergarten, burned and no longer exists, so this schoolhouse is the best representative of that first kindergarten. Because this building was moved from its original location and substantially changed, the National Register doesn't consider it of great architectural significance. It does consider it significant to the history of education at a national level, because Schurz's school in Watertown was the first kindergarten in the U.S.

Mention has been made of two attempts to found kindergartens, perhaps as early as 1849-1850, in Belleville, Illinois. There is no record of whether the attempts succeeded. One of the entrepreneurs, J. Fraus, married Marie Boelte who had a reputation as a kindergarten pioneer.
