= Watertown, Wisconsin =

- City
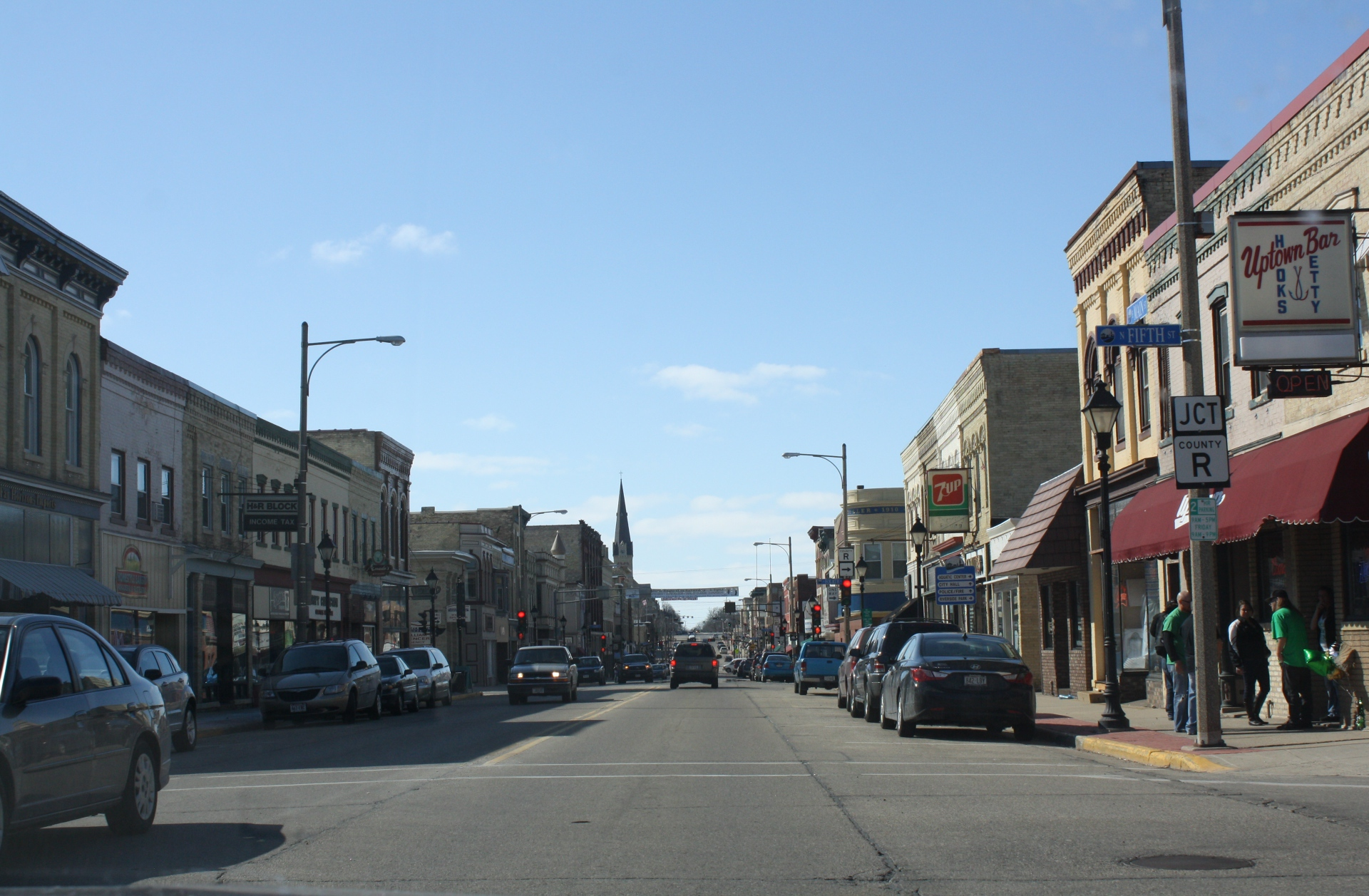
- Main Street Commercial Historic District
- Interactive map of Watertown, Wisconsin
- Location within Wisconsin Location within the United States
- Coordinates: 43°12′N 88°43′W
- Country: United States
- State: Wisconsin
- Counties: Jefferson, Dodge

Government
  - Type: Mayor/Council
  - General: Robert Stocks

Area
  - Total: 12.46 sq mi (32.28 km^{2})
  - Land: 12.07 sq mi (31.25 km^{2})
  - Water: 0.40 sq mi (1.04 km^{2})
- Elevation: 853 ft (260 m)

Population (2020)
  - Total: 22,926
  - Density: 1,946.2/sq mi (751.43/km^{2})
- Time zone: UTC-6 (Central (CST))
  - Summer (DST): UTC-5 (CDT)
- Postal codes: 53094, 53098
- Area code: 920
- FIPS code: 55-83975
- GNIS feature ID: 1576295
- Website: www.watertownwi.gov

Watertown is a city in Jefferson and Dodge counties in the U.S. state of Wisconsin. The population was 22,926 at the 2020 census, of which 14,674 were in Jefferson County and 8,252 were in Dodge County. Division Street, several blocks north of downtown, marks the county line. Watertown is a principal city of the Watertown–Fort Atkinson micropolitan statistical area which is in turn a sub-market of the larger Milwaukee–Waukesha–Racine combined statistical area.

== History ==
=== Origin ===
Watertown was first settled by Timothy Johnson, who built a cabin on the west side of the Rock River in 1836. He was born in Middleton, Middlesex County, Connecticut, on June 28, 1792. A park on the west side of the city is named in his honor. The area was settled to utilize the power of the Rock River, which falls 20 feet (6.1 m) in two miles (two 10-foot (3.0 m) dams). In contrast, the Rock River falls only 34 feet (10 m) in 58 miles (93 km) upstream from Watertown. The water power was first used for sawmills, and later prompted the construction of two hydroelectric dams, one downtown (where the river flows south) and one on the eastern edge of the city (where the river flows north).

Watertown's founders were settlers from New England, part of a wave of East Coast farmers who headed west into what were the wilds of the Northwest Territory during the early 1800s. This migration was influenced by the completion of the Erie Canal and the end of the Black Hawk War. When settlers arrived in what is now Jefferson, the landscape was made up of dense virgin forest and wild prairie. The newcomers built farms, roads, schools, and government buildings, and established post routes. They brought along many of their Yankee values, such as passion for education and staunch support of abolitionism. They were mostly members of the Congregationalist Church, though some were Episcopalian. Due to the second Great Awakening some had also converted to Methodism or become Baptists before settling in Watertown. Like much of Wisconsin, Watertown would be culturally consistent with New England for most of its early history. It was incorporated as a village in 1849, and chartered as a city in 1853.

In the 1850s, German immigrants began arriving in Watertown, bringing with them proclivities for classical music, the Latin language, and ornate furniture. Unlike other parts of the country where immigrants from Germany were met with discrimination and xenophobia, the population of Watertown.was welcoming. This warm reception led to chain migration, which in turn greatly increased the German population of the region. Ideologically they had much in common with the New England-derived population. For example, both groups opposed slavery and high regard for commerce and industry. Economically, both communities would thrive in Watertown for the entirety of the 19th century, not facing any measurable economic hardships until the Great Depression of the 1930s.

=== Milwaukee and Rock River Canal ===
A canal connecting Milwaukee to the Watertown area was once planned, with the territorial legislature incorporating the Milwaukee and Rock River Canal Company in 1836. The idea of creating a waterway between the Great Lakes and the Mississippi River had been abandoned in favor of railroad transportation by 1848.

=== 19th century growth ===
In 1853, a plank road was completed from Milwaukee to Watertown. After plank roads were no longer used, the route was replaced by Wisconsin Highway 16 and a railroad. A street named "Watertown Plank Road" survives in Milwaukee, providing the name for the "Plank Road Brewery" family of beers, produced by Miller Brewing Company in Milwaukee.

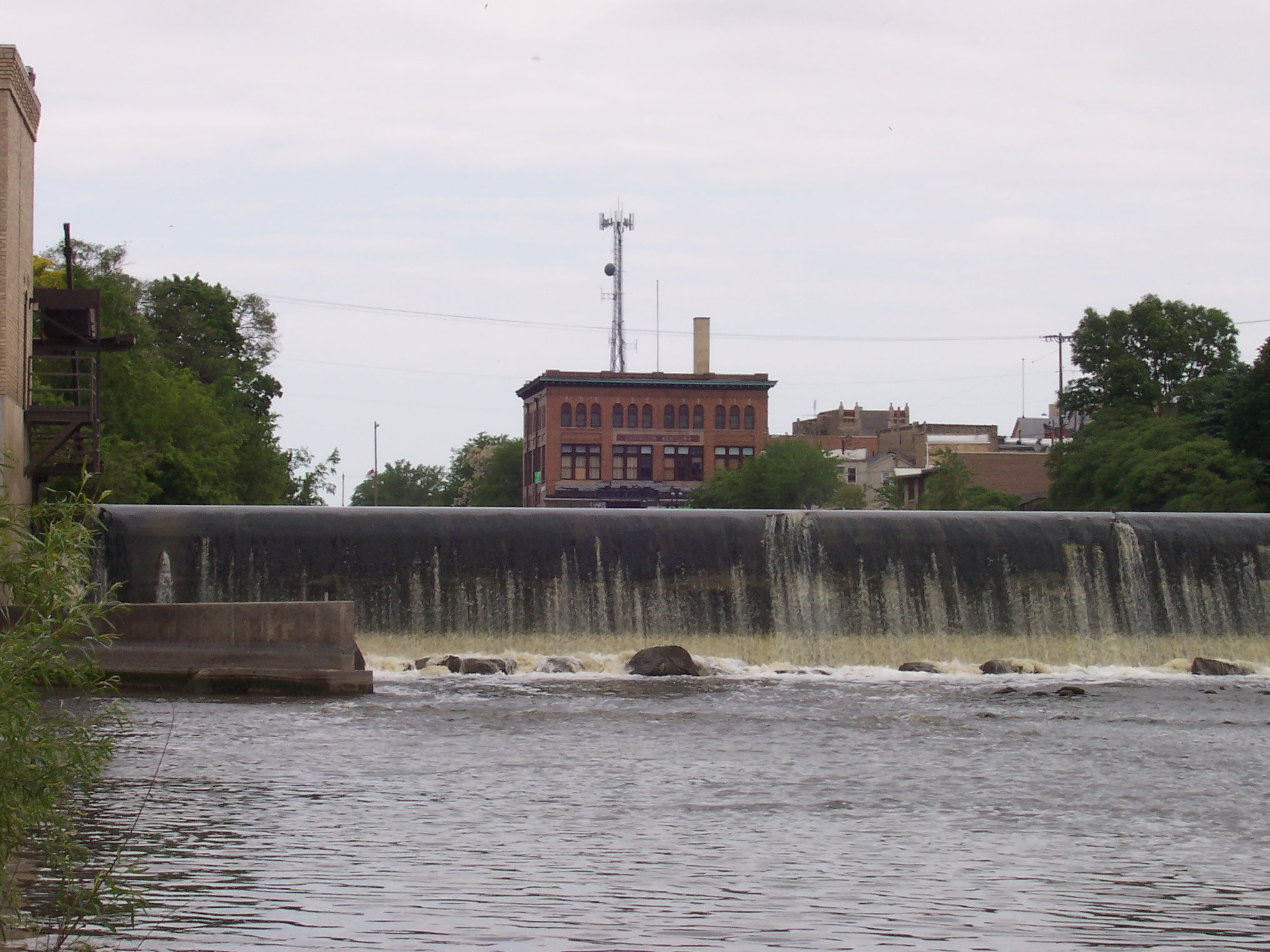
The downstream of Watertown's two dams, with a portion of downtown in the background

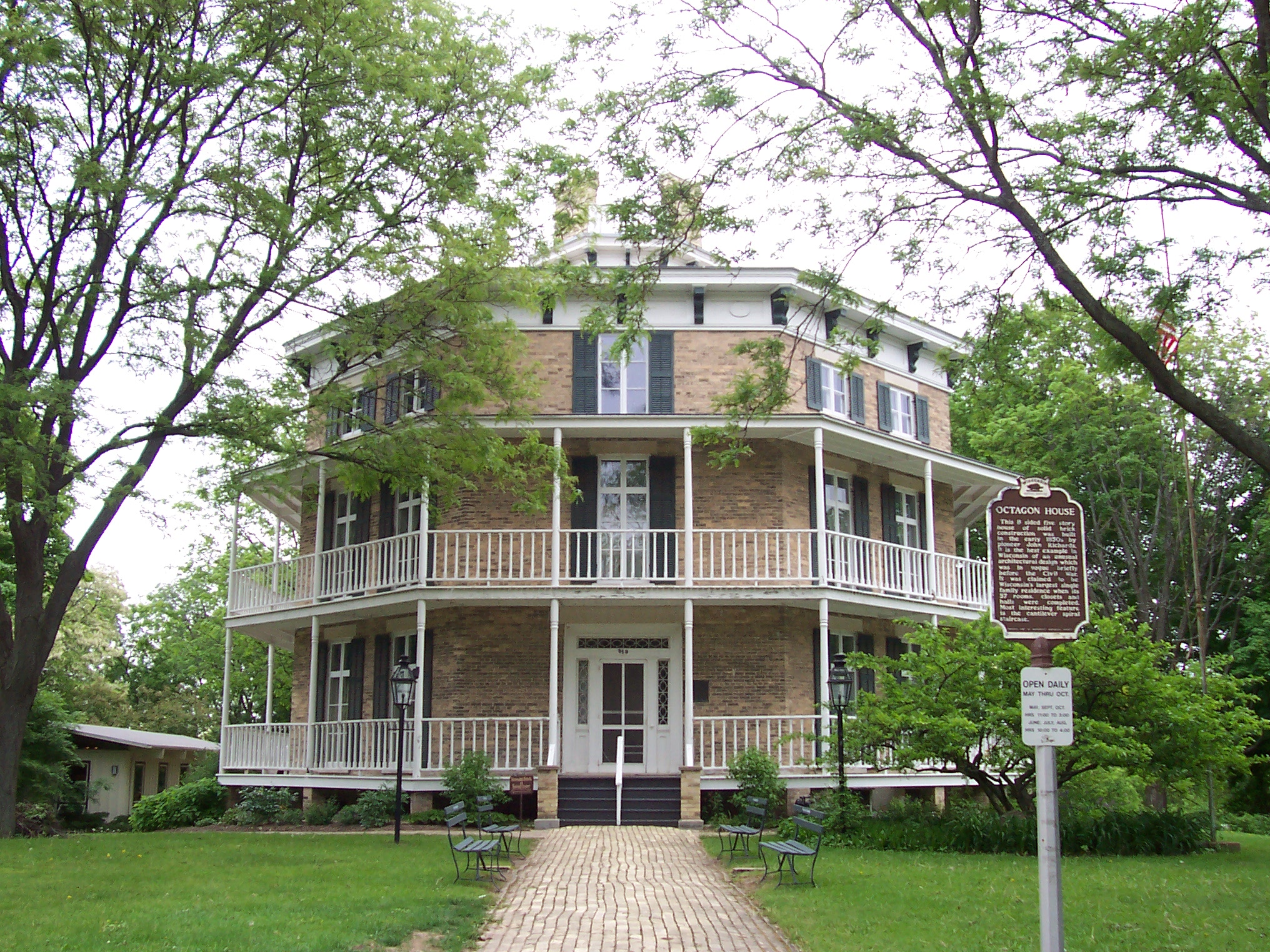
Watertown's Octagon House

Watertown is the home of the first kindergarten in the United States, started in 1856 by Margarethe Schurz, wife of statesman Carl Schurz. The building that housed this kindergarten is now located on the grounds of the Octagon House Museum in Watertown.

=== City railroad bond default ===
Growth of the city was substantially hampered when Watertown issued almost half a million dollars in bonds to support the building of two railroads: the Chicago & Fond du Lac Company and the Milwaukee, Watertown & Madison Road Company. The success of the plank road had convinced residents that a railroad would be even more beneficial, and bonds were issued from 1853 to 1855. The Milwaukee and Watertown Railroad, as it was called before it extended westward to Madison, was completed in 1855. It was the second railroad line in the Wisconsin.

Before the next railroad line could be completed, both railroad companies went bankrupt in the Panic of 1857. The bonds were sold by the original investors to out-of-town speculators at a small fraction of their face value. The city did not feel compelled to pay off the bonds because the creditors who held the bonds were not the original bond holders. Ultimately the creditors exerted so much pressure on Watertown to honor the bonds that the city opted to dissolve its government as they had no means to make the payments. This meant there was no legal entity or officers that could be served an order to pay or appear in court. The case was not resolved until 1889, when it had risen all the way to the Supreme Court of the United States, which dismissed the majority of the case of the creditors. A small balance remained due, which was not paid off until 1905, half a century later.

== Geography and climate ==
Watertown is located in southeastern Wisconsin, approximately midway between Madison and Milwaukee, at 43°12'N 88°43'W (43.193, −88.724). According to the United States Census Bureau, the city has a total area of 12.46 square miles (32.27 km^{2}), of which, 12.06 square miles (31.24 km^{2}) is land and 0.40 square miles (1.04 km^{2}) is water. Small communities in the immediate area (e.g., within the school district) include Richwood, Lebanon, Old Lebanon, Sugar Island, Pipersville, Concord, Ebenezer, and Grellton.

The Rock River flows through Watertown in a horseshoe bend before heading south and west on its way to the Mississippi River. The city originally developed inside the horseshoe, though it has long since grown beyond it. Silver Creek adjoins the river in the city, as does a short creek on the west side.

The most notable geographical feature is a high density of drumlins, long hills formed by the glaciers of the Wisconsin glaciation as they retreated northwards. Hills in the area are elongated in the north-south direction.

Climate data for Watertown, Wisconsin (1991–2020 normals, extremes 1893–present)
Month	Jan	Feb	Mar	Apr	May	Jun	Jul	Aug	Sep	Oct	Nov	Dec	Year
Record high °F (°C)	60 (16)	70 (21)	82 (28)	91 (33)	97 (36)	101 (38)	104 (40)	103 (39)	100 (38)	89 (32)	76 (24)	66 (19)	104 (40)
Mean daily maximum °F (°C)	26.4 (−3.1)	30.3 (−0.9)	42.2 (5.7)	55.6 (13.1)	67.8 (19.9)	77.7 (25.4)	81.3 (27.4)	79.5 (26.4)	72.8 (22.7)	59.6 (15.3)	44.6 (7.0)	32.0 (0.0)	55.8 (13.2)
Daily mean °F (°C)	18.4 (−7.6)	21.8 (−5.7)	33.1 (0.6)	45.4 (7.4)	57.3 (14.1)	67.4 (19.7)	71.2 (21.8)	69.3 (20.7)	61.8 (16.6)	49.6 (9.8)	36.2 (2.3)	24.7 (−4.1)	46.4 (8.0)
Mean daily minimum °F (°C)	10.5 (−11.9)	13.3 (−10.4)	24.0 (−4.4)	35.1 (1.7)	46.9 (8.3)	57.1 (13.9)	61.1 (16.2)	59.0 (15.0)	50.8 (10.4)	39.5 (4.2)	27.9 (−2.3)	17.3 (−8.2)	36.9 (2.7)
Record low °F (°C)	−31 (−35)	−33 (−36)	−23 (−31)	10 (−12)	22 (−6)	30 (−1)	41 (5)	34 (1)	20 (−7)	7 (−14)	−12 (−24)	−27 (−33)	−33 (−36)
Average precipitation inches (mm)	1.37 (35)	1.35 (34)	1.90 (48)	3.67 (93)	4.19 (106)	5.80 (147)	4.50 (114)	4.11 (104)	3.47 (88)	3.00 (76)	2.14 (54)	1.75 (44)	37.25 (946)
Average snowfall inches (cm)	11.0 (28)	9.7 (25)	4.4 (11)	1.6 (4.1)	0.1 (0.25)	0.0 (0.0)	0.0 (0.0)	0.0 (0.0)	0.0 (0.0)	0.3 (0.76)	1.4 (3.6)	8.5 (22)	37.0 (94)
Average precipitation days (≥ 0.01 in)	8.4	7.7	8.4	11.9	13.3	11.9	11.0	10.2	10.0	10.9	9.1	9.7	122.5
Average snowy days (≥ 0.1 in)	7.1	6.3	3.2	1.2	0.0	0.0	0.0	0.0	0.0	0.3	1.7	6.2	26.0
Source: NOAA

== Demographics ==
Historical population
Census	Pop.	Note	%±
1850	1,451		—
1860	5,302		265.4%
1870	7,550		42.4%
1880	7,883		4.4%
1890	8,755		11.1%
1900	8,437		−3.6%
1910	8,829		4.6%
1920	9,299		5.3%
1930	10,613		14.1%
1940	11,301		6.5%
1950	12,417		9.9%
1960	13,943		12.3%
1970	15,683		12.5%
1980	18,113		15.5%
1990	19,142		5.7%
2000	21,598		12.8%
2010	23,861		10.5%
2020	22,926		−3.9%
U.S. Decennial Census

=== 2020 census ===
As of the 2020 census, Watertown had a population of 22,926. The median age was 40.0 years. 23.4% of residents were under the age of 18 and 18.4% of residents were 65 years of age or older. For every 100 females there were 95.5 males, and for every 100 females age 18 and over there were 92.6 males age 18 and over.

98.2% of residents lived in urban areas, while 1.8% lived in rural areas.

The population density was 1,900.4 inhabitants per square mile (733.7/km^{2}). There were 9,826 housing units at an average density of 814.5 per square mile (314.5/km^{2}); 4.7% were vacant. The homeowner vacancy rate was 1.2% and the rental vacancy rate was 5.3%.

There were 9,361 households in Watertown, of which 28.3% had children under the age of 18 living in them. Of all households, 46.7% were married-couple households, 18.4% were households with a male householder and no spouse or partner present, and 26.9% were households with a female householder and no spouse or partner present. About 30.8% of all households were made up of individuals and 14.3% had someone living alone who was 65 years of age or older.

Racial composition as of the 2020 census
Race	Number	Percent
White	20,158	87.9%
Black or African American	275	1.2%
American Indian and Alaska Native	96	0.4%
Asian	179	0.8%
Native Hawaiian and Other Pacific Islander	6	0.0%
Some other race	793	3.5%
Two or more races	1,419	6.2%
Hispanic or Latino (of any race)	2,198	9.6%

=== 2010 census ===
As of the census of 2010, there were 23,861 people, 9,187 households, and 6,006 families living in the city. The population density was 1,970.4 inhabitants per square mile (760.8/km^{2}). There were 9,745 housing units at an average density of 804.7 per square mile (310.7/km^{2}). The racial makeup of the city was 94.0% White, 0.8% African American, 0.3% Native American, 0.8% Asian, 2.7% from other races, and 1.4% from two or more races. Hispanic or Latino people of any race were 7.3% of the population.

There were 9,187 households, of which 33.0% had children under the age of 18 living with them, 50.0% were married couples living together, 10.5% had a female householder with no husband present, 4.8% had a male householder with no wife present, and 34.6% were non-families. 28.6% of all households were made up of individuals, and 13.2% had someone living alone who was 65 years of age or older. The average household size was 2.46 and the average family size was 3.03.

The median age in the city was 35.7 years. 25.7% of residents were under the age of 18; 10.3% were between the ages of 18 and 24; 25.4% were from 25 to 44; 24% were from 45 to 64; and 14.5% were 65 years of age or older. The gender makeup of the city was 48.4% male and 51.6% female.

=== 2000 census ===
As of the census of 2000, there were 21,598 people, 8,022 households, and 5,567 families living in the city. The population density was 1,974.1 people per square mile (762.3/km^{2}). There were 8,330 housing units at an average density of 761.4 per square mile (294.0/km^{2}). The racial makeup of the city was 95.90% White, 0.25% African American, 0.39% Native American, 0.61% Asian, 0.03% Pacific Islander, 1.69% from other races, and 1.13% from two or more races. Hispanic or Latino people of any race were 4.94% of the population.

There were 8,022 households, out of which 34.9% had children under the age of 18 living with them, 56.2% were married couples living together, 9.5% had a female householder with no husband present, and 30.6% were non-families. 25.5% of all households were made up of individuals, and 12.1% had someone living alone who was 65 years of age or older. The average household size was 2.55 and the average family size was 3.07.

In the city, the population was spread out, with 26.0% under the age of 18, 10.3% from 18 to 24, 29.6% from 25 to 44, 19.4% from 45 to 64, and 14.7% who were 65 years of age or older. The median age was 35 years. For every 100 females, there were 93.9 males. For every 100 females age 18 and over, there were 90.0 males.

The median income for a household in the city was $42,562, and the median income for a family was $50,686. Males had a median income of $34,825 versus $23,811 for females. The per capita income for the city was $18,977. About 4.6% of families and 6.7% of the population were below the poverty line, including 7.8% of those under age 18 and 6.9% of those age 65 or over.

== Economy ==
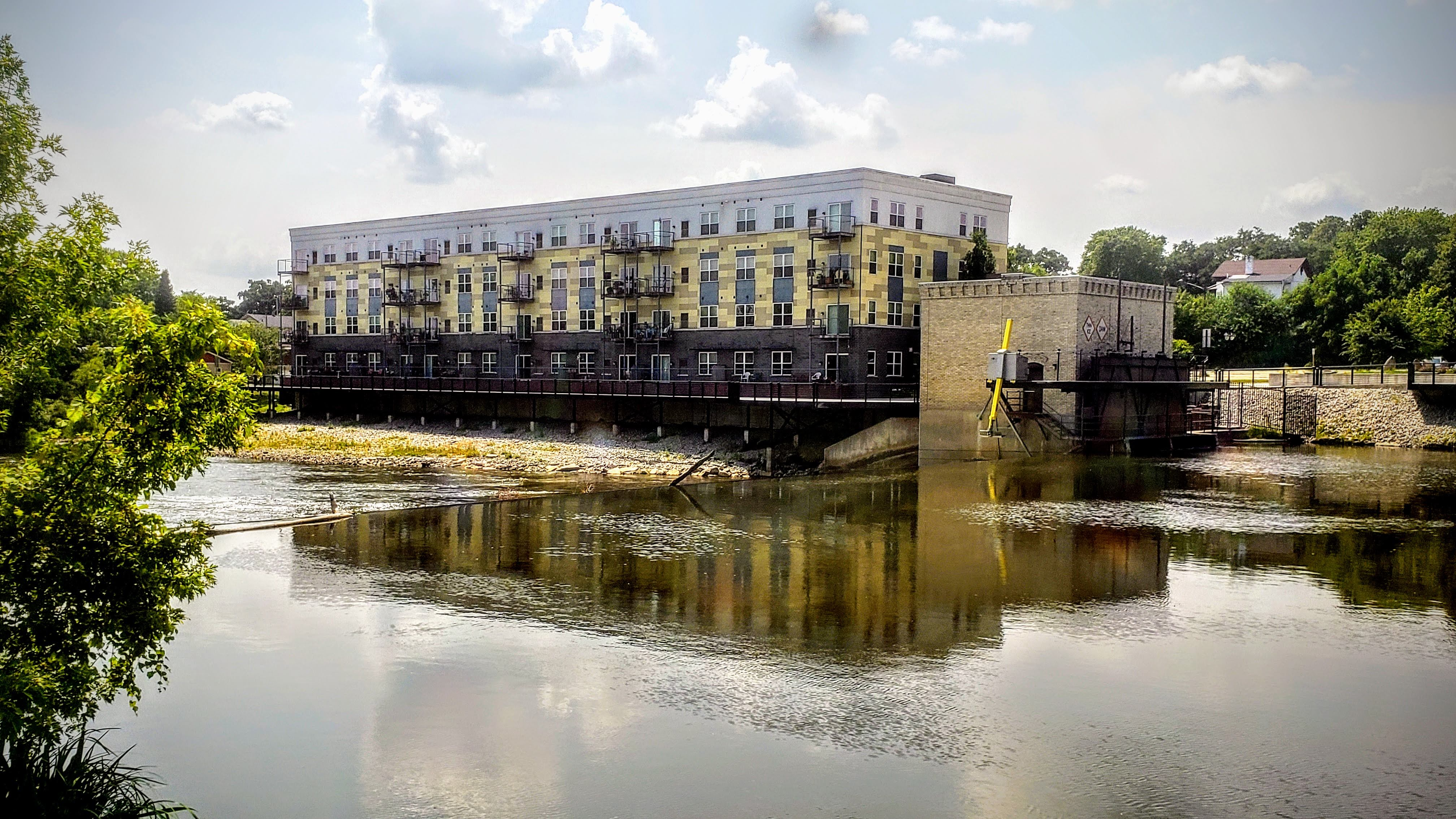
Watertown River Walk

Watertown's major employers are the school district, Watertown Regional Medical Center, CQC, several light industries, food processing, metals, electronics, and regional distribution companies.

Rail & Transload, Inc., formerly known as Specialty Ingredients, is a transloading facility and terminal railroad located in Watertown that operates approximately 1,100 feet (0.21 mi) of track. The operations occur mostly within a small rail yard directly connected to the Canadian Pacific mainline. The yard has room for up to 125 freight cars, and the inside facility has room for up to five. These are mostly hoppers and tank cars.

== Historic landmarks ==
- Beals and Torrey Shoe Co. Building
- Chicago and North Western Depot
- First Kindergarten
- August and Eliza Fuermann Jr. House
- Octagon House

== Education ==
Watertown is in the Watertown Unified School District. The city has one public high school, Watertown High School. Riverside Middle School is on the eastern edge of the city. The public elementary schools in the city are Lincoln, Schurz, Douglas, and Webster. The city also has one charter high school, Endeavor Charter School.

Six parochial schools serve elementary and middle school students in Watertown, four Lutheran and two Catholic. Luther Preparatory School, a school affiliated with the Wisconsin Evangelical Lutheran Synod (WELS), is located in the central city.

Maranatha Baptist University and its associated private high school, Maranatha Baptist Academy, are located on the west side of Watertown. A branch of the Madison Area Technical College is also on the west side.

== Media ==
The local newspaper, the Watertown Daily Times, dates back to November 23, 1895, when John W. Cruger and E. J. Schoolcraft formed a partnership to publish a daily newspaper. The newspaper currently has 25,000 readers.

The radio station WMDX (formerly WTTN), AM 1580, was licensed to Watertown but is now licensed to with the transmitter located west of Columbus, Wisconsin while the studio ultimately moved to Madison where it serves as a news/talk outlet. WJJO 94.1 FM was originally in Watertown, but is now also located in Madison with an active rock format. Watertown is still well served by radio stations from the Madison, Milwaukee and Janesville markets as well as signals originating from surrounding towns.

Watertown operates a local government-access television (GATV) channel. Programming includes church services from around the area, as well as special programming, sports, and community events.

Watertown is in the Milwaukee television market with stations from Madison also available over the air and on cable.

== Transportation ==
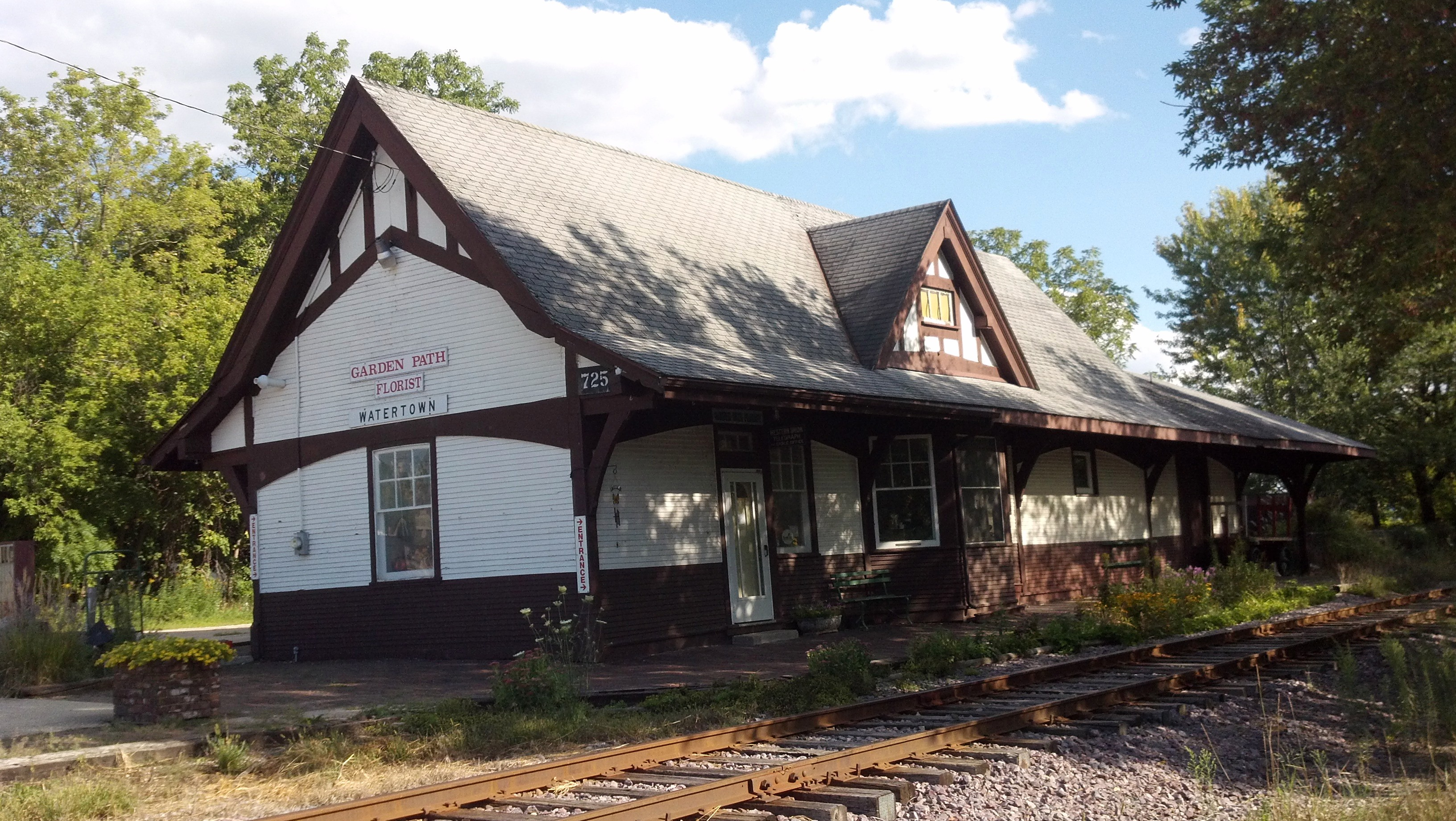
Watertown station

=== Major highways ===
- Highway 16 (Wisconsin)
- Highway 19 (Wisconsin)
- Highway 26 (Wisconsin)

=== Airport ===
Watertown Municipal Airport (KRYV) provides service for the city and surrounding communities.

=== Rail ===
Amtrak's Empire Builder and Borealis passenger trains pass through, but do not stop in Watertown. The nearest Amtrak train station is in Columbus, Wisconsin. Freight rail service is provided by the Canadian Pacific Railway (CP), the Union Pacific Railroad (UP), and the Wisconsin and Southern Railroad (WSOR). Plans to extend some Hiawatha trains from Milwaukee to Madison include the possibility of adding a stop in Watertown.

=== Bus/Taxi ===
The city subsidizes a "Watertown Transit" service that provides taxi and small bus "ride sharing" services between requested stops.

== Healthcare ==
Watertown Regional Medical Center is a 95 bed hospital with a level III trauma center. There are 35.4 primary care physicians per 100,000 population in the area. Watertown is designated as a mental health Health Professional Shortage Area (HPSA). By 2035, Watertown is estimated to have a 51.6% deficit in primary care physicians, the sixth largest expected deficit in Wisconsin. There are no behavioral health professionals in Watertown.

== Notable people ==
- Charles Beckman, Wisconsin State Representative
- Al Bentzin, guard in National Football League
- R. D. Blumenfeld, journalist, editor of the British Daily Express
- Champ Boettcher, fullback in National Football League
- Daniel Brandenstein, NASA astronaut, veteran of four space shuttle flights
- Ray Busler, player in National Football League
- Luther A. Cole, politician and businessman
- Joseph E. Davies, second ambassador to represent U.S. in Soviet Union
- William M. Dennis, Wisconsin state legislator
- William Ellis, Medal of Honor recipient
- Edward W. Fehling, Michigan State Senator
- Hezekiah Flinn, Wisconsin State Representative
- Charles R. Gill, Attorney General of Wisconsin
- Hiram Gill, Mayor of Seattle, Washington
- Daniel Hall, Wisconsin State Representative
- C. Hugo Jacobi, Wisconsin State Representative and businessman
- John Jagler, Wisconsin legislator
- Charles A. Kading, Congressman
- Lloyd Kasten, language scholar
- Robert Kastenmeier, Congressman
- John Kessler, Wisconsin State Representative
- Eugene H. Killian, Wisconsin State Representative
- Frederick Kusel, Wisconsin State Senator
- Mary Lasker, health activist, recipient of Presidential Medal of Freedom and Congressional Gold Medal
- John A. Lovely, Minnesota Supreme Court justice
- Vincent R. Mathews, Wisconsin State Representative
- Christian Mayer, Wisconsin State Representative
- Peter McGovern, Minnesota State Senator
- Fred Merkle, nicknamed "Bonehead" was an American first baseman in Major League Baseball for Giants, Dodgers, Cubs
- Blaine Mueller, assistant coach for the Charlotte Hornets of the NBA.
- Charles Mulberger, Wisconsin State Senator and Mayor of Watertown
- Nate Oats, basketball head coach, University of Alabama
- Carlotta Perry, poet
- Ben Peterson, Olympic gold and silver medalist in wrestling
- Judson Prentice, Wisconsin State Senator
- Theodore Prentiss, Wisconsin State Representative
- J. A. O. Preus III, former President of Concordia University, Irvine, California
- Meinhardt Raabe, actor
- Edward Racek, Wisconsin State Representative and Mayor of Watertown
- Randall J. Radtke, Wisconsin State Representative
- Stanley R. Riggs, coastal geologist
- Patrick Rogan, Wisconsin State Representative
- Theodore H. Rowell, pharmaceutical industrialist and politician
- John C. Schuman, Wisconsin State Senator
- Carl Schurz, U.S. Secretary of the Interior
- Margarethe Schurz, founder of first kindergarten in U.S.
- Michael J. Schwerin, U.S. Navy admiral
- Thomas Shinnick, Wisconsin State Representative
- Albert Solliday, Wisconsin State Senator
- Jesse Stone, Lieutenant Governor of Wisconsin
- Doris Tetzlaff, baseball player
- C. F. Viebahn, Wisconsin State Representative
- William Voss, Wisconsin State Senator
- Byron F. Wackett, Wisconsin State Representative
- Myron B. Williams, Wisconsin State Senator
- Joseph Wimmer, Wisconsin State Representative
- Ferdinand T. Yahr, Wisconsin State Senator
