= Eugene H. Killian =

American politician

Eugene H. Killian (December 1, 1873 – February 19, 1943) was an American printer, newspaper man, and politician.

Born in Watertown, Wisconsin, Killian was a linotype printer and wrote several articles about Watertown for the Watertown Daily Times. He was also involved with the Typographical Union and the Wisconsin State Federation of Labor. Killian served on the Watertown Fire and Police Commission and was a Republican. Killian served in the Wisconsin State Assembly from 1921 to 1925. He died in Watertown, Wisconsin.
