= H. J. Grell =

American politician

H. J. Grell was a member of the Wisconsin State Assembly. He was elected to the Assembly in 1914 and 1916. Other positions Grell held include President (similar to Mayor) and a member of the school board of Johnson Creek, Wisconsin. He was a Republican. Grell was born in Johnson Creek on November 29, 1866.
