= Thomas Shinnick =

American politician

Thomas Shinnick was a member of the Wisconsin State Assembly.

== Biography ==
Shinnick was born on April 1, 1833, in County Cork, Ireland. He moved to Watertown, Wisconsin, in 1855.

== Career ==
Shinnick was a member of the Assembly in 1867. Other positions he held include Chairman (similar to Mayor) and Clerk of Watertown. He was a Democrat.
