= 1947 New Year Honours =

British royal recognitions

The 1947 New Year Honours were appointments by many of the Commonwealth realms of King George VI to various orders and honours to reward and highlight good works by citizens of those countries. They were published on 31 December 1946.

The recipients of honours are displayed here as they were styled before tsheir new honour, and arranged by honour, with classes (Knight, Knight Grand Cross, etc.) and then divisions (Military, Civil, etc.) as appropriate.

== United Kingdom and Colonies ==
=== Viscounts ===
- The Right Honourable Stanley Melbourne Bruce, CH, MC, LLD, FRS, Chairman of the International Emergency Food Council.
- The Right Honourable William Allen, Baron Jowitt, Lord High Chancellor of Great Britain.

=== Barons ===
- Charles Dukes, CBE, lately General Secretary of the National Union of General and Municipal Workers. Member of the Trades Union Congress General Council since 1934, and Chairman in 1945. For political and public services.
- General Sir Hastings Lionel Ismay, GCB, CH, DSO, lately Additional Secretary (Military) to the Cabinet and Chief of Staff to the Minister of Defence.
- George Morgan Garro-Jones, Member of Parliament for South Hackney, 1924–1929 and for Aberdeen, 1935–1945. Parliamentary Secretary to the Ministry of Production, 1942–1945. For political and public services.
- Fred Kershaw, OBE, JP. For political and public services.
- The Right Honourable Sir Geoffrey Lawrence, DSO, TD, DL (Lord Justice Lawrence), one of the Lords Justices of Appeal.
- Sir Walter Thomas Layton, CH, CBE, Director General of Programmes, Ministry of Supply, 1940–1942. Head of Joint War Production Staff, Ministry of Production, 1942–1943. For public services.
- Sir John Loader Maffey, GCMG, KCB, KCVO, CSI, CIE, United Kingdom Representative to Eire.
- Sir Ernest Darwin Simon, LLD, MInstCE, MIMechE. For public services.

=== Privy Counsellors ===
- Clement Edward Davies, KC, MP, Member of Parliament for Montgomeryshire since 1929. Chairman of the Liberal Parliamentary Party. For political and public services.
- The Honourable James Garfield Gardiner, Minister of Agriculture, Canada, since 1935.
- William Glenvil Hall, MP, Financial Secretary to the Treasury since 1945. Member of Parliament for Portsmouth Central, 1929–1931, and for the Colne Valley Division of Yorkshire since 1939.
- Arthur Henderson, KC, MP, Parliamentary Under Secretary of State for India and for Burma since 1945. Member of Parliament for Cardiff South, 1923–1924 and 1929–1931, and for the Kingswinford Division of Staffordshire since 1935.
- The Honourable Ian Alistair Mackenzie, KC, Minister of National Defence, Canada, 1935–1939; Minister of Pensions and National Health, 1939–1944; and Minister of Veteran Affairs since 1944.

=== Knights Bachelor ===
- Lieutenant-Colonel Neville Anderson, CBE, Presiding Special Commissioner of Income Tax, Board of Inland Revenue.
- Major William Baird, DL. For public and charitable services in Northern Ireland.
- Harold Montague Barton, FCA, Financial Director, National Dock Labour Corporation, Ltd.
- Brigadier-General Atwell Charles Baylay, CBE, DSO, Chairman, Birmingham and District Engineering and Allied Employers' Association.
- Alderman Frederick Tidbury Beer, Sheriff of the City of London, 1945–1946.
- Frederick Archibald Bell, OBE, MC, Chairman of the Herring Industry Board.
- Major Granville St John Orde Browne, CMG, OBE, Labour Adviser to the Colonial Office.
- Arthur Belcher Cauty, Chairman of the National Maritime Board.
- William Henry Coates, PhD, a Deputy Chairman, Imperial Chemical Industries, Ltd. For services to Government Departments.
- Alderman Edward George Eddy, OBE, JP, Representative for the West Midland Region on the National Savings Committee.
- Thomas Frazer, OBE. For services as Deputy General Manager and Secretary, North British and Mercantile Insurance Co., Ltd.
- Alexander Gray, CBE, Professor of Political Economy and Mercantile Law, University of Edinburgh. For services to Government Departments.
- Henry Mendelssohn Hake, CBE, Director of the National Portrait Gallery.
- Henry Nazeby Harrington, Solicitor to the Board of Customs and Excise.
- Walter Norman Haworth, ScD, FRS, Mason Professor of Chemistry, and Director of the Department of Chemistry in the University of Birmingham.
- Alfred Herbert Holland, Chief Master in the Chancery Division of the Supreme Court of Judicature.
- Eardley Lancelot Holland, MD, FRCS, FRCP, President of the Royal College of Obstetricians and Gynaecologists.
- Percy Clarke Hull, Mus.Doc, FRCO, LRAM, ARCM, Organist and Master of the Choristers, Hereford Cathedral. Conductor of the Three Choirs Festival.
- Robert John Mathison Inglis, CIE, Chief of the Transport Division, British Element, Control Commission for Germany.
- Cadwaladr Bryner Jones, CB, CBE, LLD, Liaison Officer, Ministry of Agriculture and Fisheries. Chairman of the Montgomery War Agricultural Executive Committee.
- Lieutenant-Colonel Cyril Vivian Jones, CBE, President of the Food Manufacturers' Federation.
- Harold Leslie Kenward. For services to the Ministry of Supply in connection with the rubber tyre industry.
- Major George Humphrey Maurice Broun-Lindsay, DSO, JP, DL, President, Association of County Councils in Scotland. Convener, East Lothian County Council.
- Charles Percy Lister. For services as Managing Director of the United Kingdom Commercial Corporation.
- Thomas McPherson, MBE, Director and General Manager, Wallsend Slipway & Engineering Company, Ltd.
- Wilfrid Walter Nops, Clerk of the Central Criminal Court.
- Alexander Paterson, MC. HM Commissioner of Prisons and Director of Convict Prisons.
- Arthur Pickup, President of the Co-operative Wholesale Society.
- Ralph David Richardson. For services to the stage.
- Arthur Stanley Rogers, Chairman of the British Insurance Association. General Manager and Director, London and Lancashire Insurance Company, Ltd.
- William Guy Ropner. Lately Director of the Convoy Section, Ministry of Transport.
- Edward Graham Savage, CB, Education Officer to the London County Council.
- Colonel William Dishington Scott, CBE, DSO, MC, TD, JP, DL, Chief Divisional Food Officer for Scotland, Ministry of Food.
- Ernest Woodhouse Smith, CBE, DSc, lately President of the Institute of Fuel.
- Metford Watkins, Chairman, General Purposes Committee of the Retail Distributors' Association.
- Alderman Frederick Michael Wells, Sheriff of the City of London, 1945–1946.
- Walter Addington Willis, CBE, Crown Umpire, Unemployment Insurance.
- Zwinglius Frank Willis, CBE, General Secretary of the National Council, Young Men's Christian Association.

Dominions

- Kerr Grant, MSc, FInstP, Professor of Physics, University of Adelaide, State of South Australia. For public services.
- The Honourable Rupert Oakley Shoobridge, President of the Legislative Council, State of Tasmania.

India

- The Honourable Mr. Justice Norman George Armstrong Edgley, Indian Civil Service, Barrister-at-Law, Puisne Judge of the High Court of Judicature at Fort William in Bengal.
- Major-General Hugh Clive Buckley, CSI, Indian Medical Service, Principal (retired), Medical College, Agra, United Provinces.
- Norman Percival Arthur Smith, CIE, OBE, Indian Police, Director, Intelligence Bureau, Home Department, Government of India.
- The Honourable Sardar Bahadur Nawab Asadullah Khan, CIE, Member of the Council of State, Raisani, Kalat State.
- Roger Thomas, CIE, Indian Agricultural Service (retired), Adviser to the Government of Sind and Managing Director, Sind Land Development, Limited.
- Hugh Stuart Town, MLA, Director, Messrs. Binny and Company, Limited, Madras.
- Robert Laing MacLennan, CIE, Heeleakha Tea Estate, Sibsagar District, Chairman, Assam Valley Branch, Indian Tea Association, Assam.

Colonies, Protectorates, Etc.

- Henry Lovell Goldsworthy Gurney, CMG, Colonial Administrative Service, Chief Secretary, Palestine; lately Colonial Secretary, Gold Coast.
- Hugh Ragg. For public services in Fiji.
- Francis Joseph Soertsz, Senior Puisne Judge, Ceylon.
- Herbert Edmund Walker, CBE, Director of Public Works, Nigeria.

=== Order of the Bath ===
==== Knights Grand Cross of the Order of the Bath (GCB) ====
Civil Division

- Sir (James) Alan Noel Barlow, Bt, KCB, KBE, Second Secretary, HM Treasury.

==== Knights Commander of the Order of the Bath (KCB) ====
Military Division

Royal Navy

- Acting Vice-Admiral (S) Malcolm Giffard Stebbing Cull, CB, CBE, MVO.
- Vice-Admiral Sir Douglas Blake Fisher, KBE, CB.

Army

- General Sir Montagu George North Stopford, KBE, CB, DSO, MC (4554), late The Rifle Brigade (Prince Consort's Own).
- General Sir Geoffry Allen Percival Scoones, KBE, CB, CSI, DSO, MC, Indian Army.

Royal Air Force

- Air Vice-Marshal Alfred Conrad Collier, CB, CBE (Retired).
- Air Vice-Marshal Douglas Harries, CB, AFC (Retired).

Civil Division

- Colonel Percy Reginald Owen Abel Simner, CB, DSO, TD, Chairman, Territorial Army and Air Force Association, of the County of London.
- Harold Corti Emmerson, CB, Permanent Secretary, Ministry of Works.
- David Milne, CB, Permanent Under Secretary of State, Scottish Office.
- Sir Orme Sargent, KCMG, CB, Permanent Under Secretary of State, Foreign Office.

==== Companions of the Order of the Bath (CB) ====
Military Division

Royal Navy

- Rear-Admiral Leslie Haliburton Ashmore, DSO.
- Rear-Admiral John Walter Durnford.
- Acting Rear-Admiral (S) Eyre Sturdy Duggan, OBE.
- Rear-Admiral (E) Denys Chester Ford, CBE.
- Rear-Admiral Henry Edward Horan, DSC (Retired).
- Surgeon Rear-Admiral Herbert Richard Barnes Hull, MRCS, LRCP, KHS.
- Major-General Godfrey Edward Wildman-Lushington, CBE, Royal Marines.

Army

- Brigadier (temporary) Gilbert Leonard Appleton, OBE (10740), late Royal Regiment of Artillery.
- Major-General (temporary) Edmund Charles Beard, CBE, MC, ADC (9698), late Infantry.
- Major-General (local) Valentine Blomfield, DSO (13747), late Infantry.
- Major-General (acting) Arthur Charles Tarver Evanson, MC (11675), late Infantry.
- Brigadier (temporary) Charles Granville Barry Greaves, CBE (6885), Corps of Royal Engineers.
- Major-General John Charles Oakes Marriott, CVO, DSO, MC (9506), late Foot Guards.
- Major-General Eric Paytherus Nares, CBE, MC (4593), late Infantry.
- Major-General (temporary) William Pasfield Oliver, OBE (18260), late Infantry.
- Major-General (temporary) Walter Hayes Oxley, CBE, MC (543), late Corps of Royal Engineers.
- Major-General (temporary) William Maingay Ozanne, CBE, MC (28), late Infantry.
- Major-General (temporary) Cecil Miller Smith, CBE, MC, AMIMechE (10540), late Royal Army Service Corps.
- Major-General Evelyn Alexander Sutton, CBE, MC (8525), late Royal Army Medical Corps.
- Colonel Victor John Eric Westropp, CBE, (13552), late Royal Corps of Signals.
- Major-General Eric Norman Goddard, CIE, CBE, MVO, MC, Indian Army.
- Colonel (Temporary Major-General) Berthold Wells Key, DSO, MC, Indian Army.
- Colonel (Temporary Major-General) Thomas Scott, Indian Army.
- Colonel (Temporary Major-General) Stephen Fenemore Irwin, CBE, Indian Army.

Royal Air Force

- Acting Air Vice-Marshal Thomas Edward Drowley, CBE.
- Acting Air Vice-Marshal Lawrence Fleming Pendred, MBE, DFC.
- Air Commodore Clifford Westly Busk, MC, AFC.
- Air Commodore William Ernest Staton, DSO, MC, DFC.
- Air Commodore Frank Whittle, CBE.
- Acting Air Commodore George Braithwaite Beardsworth.
- Group Captain Robert John Rodwell.

Civil Division

- Colonel David Keith Murray, VD, Chairman, Territorial Army Association of the County of Caithness.
- Hubert Edward Aldington, Chief Highway Engineer, Ministry of Transport.
- Davenport Fabian Cartwright Blunt, Under Secretary, HM Treasury.
- Harold Fieldhouse, OBE, Under Secretary, Assistance Board.
- John Malcolm Kenneth Hawton, Under Secretary, Ministry of Health.
- Sydney Walter Hood, Under Secretary, Ministry of Food.
- Lewis Bede Hutchinson, Under Secretary, Ministry of Supply.
- Hubert Miles Gladwyn Jebb, CMG, Deputy to the Secretary of State for Foreign Affairs for the Council of Foreign Ministers.
- Herbert Needham Morrison, Under Secretary, Admiralty.
- Ralph Machattie Nowell, Under Secretary, Board of Trade.
- Granville Proby, Lately Principal Clerk, Judicial Department, House of Lords.
- Frederick Charles Starling, CBE, Lately Under Secretary, Ministry of Fuel and Power.
- William Taylor, Under Secretary, Ministry of Labour and National Service.
- Hugh Townshend, Director of Telecommunications, General Post Office.

=== Order of Merit (OM) ===
- Field Marshal the Right Honourable Jan Christiaan Smuts, CH, FRS.

=== Order of the Star of India ===
==== Companions of the Order of the Star of India (CSI) ====
- Stewart Ellis Lawrence West, CIE, OBE, VD, Member, Transportation, Railway Board, New Delhi.
- The Honourable Mr. Alfred Ernest Porter, CIE, Indian Civil Service, Secretary to the Government of India in the Home Department.
- Alan Robert Cecil Westlake, CIE, Indian Civil Service, Member, Board of Revenue, Madras.
- Henry James Frampton, CIE, MC, Indian Civil Service, Chief Secretary to Government, United Provinces.
- Colonel (Honorary Brigadier) Theophilus John Ponting, CIE, MC, late 1st Punjab Regiment, Indian Army.
- Arnold Whittaker, CIE, Member of the Legislative Assembly, Political Secretary, Planting and Commerce Group, Indian Tea Association, Shillong, Assam.

=== Order of Saint Michael and Saint George ===
==== Knights Grand Cross of the Order of St Michael and St George (GCMG) ====
- Major-General Sir Philip Euen Mitchell, KCMG, MC, Governor and Commander-in-Chief, Kenya.
- Sir Ronald Ian Campbell, KCMG, CB, His Majesty's Ambassador Extraordinary and Plenipotentiary at Cairo.
- Sir Maurice Drummond Peterson, KCMG, His Majesty's Ambassador Extraordinary and Plenipotentiary at Moscow.

==== Knights Commander of the Order of St Michael and St George (KCMG) ====
- Guildhaume Myrddin-Evans, CB, Deputy Secretary, Ministry of Labour and National Service. Chairman of the Governing Body of the International Labour Office.
- Terence Allen Shone, CMG, High Commissioner for the United Kingdom in India.
- Sir John Ballingall Forbes Watson, Director of the British Employers' Confederation.
- John Alexander Calder, CMG, Senior Crown Agent for the Colonies.
- The Right Reverend Michael Furse, DD, lately Bishop of St Albans, Prelate of the Most Distinguished Order of Saint Michael and Saint George.
- Thomas Ingram Kynaston Lloyd, CMG, Assistant Under-Secretary of State, Colonial Office.
- John Balfour, CMG, Minister at His Majesty's Embassy at Washington.
- Sir George Nevile Maltby Bland, KCVO, CMG, His Majesty's Ambassador Extraordinary and Plenipotentiary at The Hague.
- Robert George Howe, CMG, an Assistant Under-Secretary of State in the Foreign Office.
- Edmund Leo Hall-Patch, CMG, a Deputy Under-Secretary of State.

==== Companions of the Order of St Michael and St George (CMG) ====
- Professor Patrick Alfred Buxton, FRS, Professor of Entomology, University of London, and Director, Department of Entomology, London School of Hygiene and Tropical Medicine.
- Major-General Stanley Woodburn Kirby, CB, CIE, OBE, MC, lately Deputy Chief of Staff (Organisation) British Element, Control Commission for Germany.
- Melville Douglas Mackenzie, MD, DTM, DPH, Principal Medical Officer in charge of Epidemiology and International Health, Ministry of Health.
- Geoffrey Parkes, lately Deputy Chief (Executive), Trade and Industry Division, British Element, Control Commission for Germany.
- Edgar Philip Rees, MC, Deputy Representative, Ministry of Transport, New York.
- George Ritchie Rice, OBE. For services as Director-General, Ministry of Supply Disposals Mission in the Middle East.
- Edward Austin Gossage Robinson, OBE, lately Economic Adviser to the Board of Trade.
- Arthur Ditchfield Storke. For services in connection with mineral resources in the Colonial Empire.
- William Poole Bishop, AFIA, Auditor General, State of South Australia.
- Charles Edward Hamilton Ferguson, MC, an Associate Commissioner, Hydro-Electric Commission, State of Tasmania. For public services.
- Albert Ray Southwood, ED, MD, MS, Chairman, Central Board of Health, State of South Australia.
- Cecil George Lewis Syers, CVO, an Assistant Under-Secretary of State in the Dominions Office.
- Ira Wild, OBE, lately a Member of the Commission of Government, Newfoundland.
- John Beville Archer, former Chief Secretary, Sarawak.
- Charles Owen Butler, Colonial Administrative Service, Chief Commissioner, Gold Coast.
- Robert Nixon Caldwell, MC, District Commissioner, Fiji.
- Harold Ambrose Robinson Cheeseman, Colonial Education Service, Director of Education, Malayan Union.
- Geoffrey Francis Taylor Colby, Colonial Administrative Service, Administrative Secretary, Nigeria.
- Robert Edward Foulger, Colonial Police Service, Commissioner of Police, Singapore.
- Charles Ernest Jones, Colonial Administrative Service, Administrative Officer, Ceylon.
- Frank Robert Kennedy, OBE, Colonial Administrative Service, Secretary for African Affairs, Uganda.
- Alfred Noel Law, MC, Colonial Administrative Service, District Commissioner, Haifa District, Palestine.
- William Linehan, DLitt, Colonial Administrative Service, Administrative Officer, Malayan Union.
- Charles Tomkinson, Colonial Administrative Service, Provincial Commissioner, Kenya.
- Arthur Norman Wolffsohn, OBE, Colonial and Financial Secretary, British Honduras.
- James Ian Cormack Crombie, until recently an Assistant Under-Secretary of State in the Foreign Office.
- Leslie Charles Hughes-Hallett, OBE, His Majesty's Envoy Extraordinary and Minister Plenipotentiary in Guatemala.
- The Honourable Robert Maurice Alers Hankey, Head of the Northern Department of the Foreign Office.
- Thomas Humphrey Marshall, formerly Deputy Director of the Research Department of the Foreign Office.
- Ernest William Meiklereid, His Majesty's Consul-General at Saigon.
- John William Taylor, MBE, Minister (Commercial) at His Majesty's Embassy at Cairo.
- Colonel (War Substantive Major) Valentine Patrick Terrel Vivian, CBE, attached to a Department of the Foreign Office.
- John Guthrie Ward, Counsellor at His Majesty's Embassy at Rome.
- Arthur John Stanley White, OBE, Secretary-General of the British Council.

Honorary Companion

- Dato Jaya Perkasa, MBE (Hon.), Trengannu Civil Service, Malayan Union.

=== Order of the Indian Empire ===
==== Knights Commander of the Order of the Indian Empire (KCIE) ====
- Major-General (Acting Lieutenant-General) Reginald Arthur Savory, CB, DSO, MC, Indian Army, Adjutant-General in India, General Headquarters, New Delhi.
- Sir Bertie Staig, CSI, Indian Civil Service, Auditor General of India.
- Sir Frederick Tymms, CIE, MC, Director-General, Civil Aviation, Government of India.
- James Birch Brown, CSI, CIE, Indian Civil Service, Secretary to His Excellency the Governor of Madras.
- Ferdinand Blyth Wace, CSI, CIE, Indian Civil Service, lately Secretary to Government, Punjab, Civil Supplies Department.

==== Companions of the Order of the Indian Empire (CIE) ====
- Herbert Daniel Benjamin, Indian Civil, Service, Additional Secretary and Draftsman to the Government of India in the Legislative Department.
- Lieutenant-Colonel (Temporary Brigadier) John Ridgway Reynolds, OBE (A.I.666), 15th Punjab Regiment, Indian Army, War Staff, India Office.
- Brigadier Eric James Boughton, OBE, Indian Army, Chief Director of Purchase, Department of Food, Government of India.
- Lieutenant-Colonel (Temporary Brigadier) Compton Southgate, MC (A.I.398), 4th (Prince of Wales Own) Gurkha Rifles, Indian Army, Commander Bombay Sub-Area.
- Lieutenant-Colonel (Temporary Brigadier) Joseph Harold Wilkinson (I.A.28), 2nd Royal Lancers, Indian Army Corps, Director of Resettlement, General Headquarters, India.
- Arthur Plumptre Faunce Hamilton, OBE, MC, Indian Forest Service, Inspector-General of Forests, Government of India.
- Terence Mostyn Collins, Indian Police, Inspector-General of Police (officiating), Central Provinces and Berar.
- Arthur Hugh Kemp, Indian Civil Service, Chief Secretary to the Government of Orissa.
- Algernon Paul LeMesurier, Indian Civil Service, Chief Secretary to the Government of Sindh.
- Geoffrey Grabham Drewe, OBE, Indian Civil Service, Secretary to the Government of Bombay in the Home Department.
- Colonel Owen Slater, MC (late Royal Engineers), Director, Survey of India.
- Frederick Heap Hutchison, Indian Service of Engineers, Chief Engineer to Government, United Provinces, Public Works Department, Irrigation Branch (East).
- Reginald De Vere Irwin, Chief Mechanical Engineer, Bengal Assam Railway, Calcutta.
- Arthur Henry Wilson, OBE, Military Accountant-General, Government of India.
- Lieutenant-Colonel (Local Colonel) Alexander Stalker Lancaster, OBE, Indian Army, Military Attaché, British Legation, Kabul.
- Albert Alfred Barnard, OBE, Indian Service of Engineers, Additional Chief Engineer, Public Works Department, Shillong, Assam.
- George Patterson Alexander, Chairman, Madras Port Trust.
- Arthur Charles Carter, OBE, Indian Police, Inspector-General of Police and Police Adviser to the Honourable the Resident for the Eastern States.
- Henry Alfred Carless, Indian Police, Inspector-General of Police, Ajmer-Merwara, and Police Adviser to the Honourable the Resident for Rajputana.
- John Adam Scroggie, OBE, Indian Police, Deputy Inspector-General of Police, Ambala Range, Ambala, Punjab.
- Lieutenant-Colonel William Joseph Webster, MC, Indian Medical Service, Senior Assistant Director, Central Research Institute, Kasauli, and Officer-in-Charge, Serum and Vaccine Section.
- Major Frederick Augustus Berrill Sheppard, OBE, Indian Medical Service, Surgeon, Government General Hospital, and Professor of Surgery, Medical College, Madras.
- Herbert Niel Randle, Indian Educational Service (retired), Librarian, India Office, London.
- Miles John Clauson, lately Private Secretary to the Secretary of State for India and for Burma.
- Harold George Russell, OBE, Road Transport Adviser, Transport Department, Government of India, New Delhi.
- William James Threlfall, Secretary and Treasurer, Imperial Bank of India, Madras.

=== Royal Victorian Order ===
==== Knights Commander of the Royal Victorian Order (KCVO) ====
- Rear-Admiral Leighton Seymour Bracegirdle, CMG, DSO, Royal Australian Navy.
- Sir Alfred James Munnings, PRA.
- Evelyn Campbell Shaw, CVO.

==== Commanders of the Royal Victorian Order (CVO) ====
- Mary Dorothea, Lady Herbert.
- Sybil Agnes Kenyon-Slaney.
- Daniel Thomas Davies, MD, B.Sc. (Wales), FRCP. (Lond.).
- Frank Anderson Juler, MA, MB, BCh, FRCS.

==== Members of the Royal Victorian Order, 4th class (MVO) ====
- Muriel Mary Edwards.
- Ralph Cyril Isard, MVO.
- The Reverend John Lamb, BD.
- Malcolm Waverley Matts.
- Lieutenant (S) Albert William Stone, MVO, MSM, Royal Navy (Retired).

==== Members of the Royal Victorian Order, 5th class (MVO) ====
- Raymond William Cracknell.
- William Bertram Richards.
- Mark Seymour.
- Edwin Bertie Shaw.

=== Order of the British Empire ===
==== Knights Grand Cross of the Order of the British Empire (GBE) ====
Military Division

- Admiral Sir Geoffrey Layton, KCB, KCMG, DSO.

Civil Division

- Sir William Crawford Currie, lately Director of the Liner Division, Ministry of Transport. Chairman and Managing Director of the Peninsular and Oriental and British-India Steam Navigation Companies.
- Sir Frederick Joseph West, KBE, MInstCE, MIMechE, JP. For services to the Ministry of Labour and National Service. Chairman and Managing Director, West's Gas Improvement Company, Ltd.
- Sir George Bailey Sansom, KCMG, Minister at His Majesty's Embassy at Washington and Adviser to His Majesty's Ambassador on Far Eastern affairs.
- Sir Victor Sassoon, Bt., Banker and Millowner, Bombay.

==== Dames Commander of the Order of the British Empire (DBE) ====
Civil Division

- Madeline Dorothy Brock, OBE, LittD, Headmistress, Mary Datchelor Girls' School, Camberwell.
- Gertrude Ann Cosgrove. For public and social welfare services in the State of Tasmania.
- Eileen Mary, Lady Walwyn. In recognition of her public and philanthropic work for the community in Newfoundland.

==== Knights Commander of the Order of the British Empire (KBE) ====
Military Division

- Admiral John Gregory Crace, CB (Retired).
- Lieutenant-General (acting) Frank Ernest Wallace Simpson, CB, DSO (15429), late Corps of Royal Engineers.
- Major-General (local) Herbert Covington Cole, CB, CBE, FSI (17189), General List.
- Air Vice-Marshal Charles Warburton Meredith, CB, CBE, AFC, Southern Rhodesian Air Force.

Civil Division

- Herbert Broadley, CBE, Deputy Secretary, Ministry of Food.
- Henry Drummond Hancock, CMG, Deputy Secretary, Ministry of National Insurance.
- George Ismay, CB, Assistant Director General (Finance) and Comptroller and Accountant General, General Post Office.
- Lancelot Herman Keay, OBE, City Architect and Director of Housing, Liverpool. President of the Royal Institute of British Architects.
- Ferdinand Michael Kroyer-Kielberg, Chairman of the Anglo-Danish Society in London.
- Sir William Valentine Wood, President of the Executive, London, Midland and Scottish Railway Company.
- Stanley Gordon Irving, CMG, until recently His Majesty's Envoy Extraordinary and Minister Plenipotentiary at Panama.
- Raja Shrimant Shankarrao Parashramrao, alias Appasaheb Patwardhan, Raja of Jamkhandi.
- Charles Robert Smith, CMG, lately Governor of British North Borneo.

==== Commanders of the Order of the British Empire (CBE) ====
Military Division

Royal Navy

- Captain William York La Roche Beverley.
- Captain Arthur Wellesley Clarke, DSO.
- Rear-Admiral Edward Bernard Cornish Dicken, OBE, DSC (Retired).
- Acting Captain (S) Douglas Howard Doig, OBE.
- Superintendent Dorothy Isherwood, Women's Royal Naval Service. (Retired).
- Captain Kenneth Sidebottom Lyle, Commanding Officer, Burma Royal Naval Volunteer Reserve.

Army

- Brigadier (temporary) Arthur Birney Davies, OBE (30521), late Royal Regiment of Artillery.
- Brigadier (temporary) Maurice Bryan Dowse, OBE (6418), late The Royal Welch Fusiliers.
- Brigadier (temporary) Henry Noel Gallagher, BSc, ADC, (11325), late Royal Army Service Corps.
- Brigadier (temporary) Harold Gordon Henderson (5785), late Royal Corps of Signals.
- Colonel (temporary) Ronald Jack Hoare, OBE (75515), Royal Regiment of Artillery.
- Brigadier Edward Robert Luxmoore Peake, MC, MP, (8464), late Corps of Royal Engineers.
- Colonel Geoffrey Oliver Carwardine Probert, (8286), late Royal Regiment of Artillery.
- Brigadier (temporary) Cyril Alfred Roberts, MBE (108017), Royal Army Service Corps.
- Controller (temporary) Viola Henrietta Christian Stirling (192832), Auxiliary Territorial Service.
- Brigadier (temporary) Thomas Byrnand Trappes-Lomax (10301), late Scots Guards.
- Senior Controller the Right Honourable Bridget Helen, Countess of Carlisle, Auxiliary Territorial Service, Director of Women's Auxiliary Corps (India).
- Lieutenant-Colonel (Temporary Brigadier) Percy Trant Clarke, OBE, The Frontier Force Regiment, Indian Army.
- Brigadier (temporary) Edward John Gibbons, MBE (191220), General List, lately Chief Civil Affairs Officer, S.A.C.S.E.A.

Royal Air Force

- Air Commodore Ernest John Dennis Townesend, Royal Air Force (Retired).
- Acting Air Commodore Henry Osmond Clarke, MB, BCh, FRCS, FRCS(I) Royal Air Force Volunteer Reserve.
- Group Captain Edward Ardley Beaulah, Royal Air Force (now Reserve of Air Force Officers).
- Group Captain John Bidney Farrant Hawkins, Reserve of Air Force Officers.
- Group Captain Louis Johannes Schoon, Southern Rhodesian Air Force.

Civil Division

- Esther Ellen Alexander, Chairman, General Council of King George's Fund for Sailors.
- William Philip Allen, General Secretary, Amalgamated Society of Locomotive Engineers and Firemen.
- Edmond Arrenton Armstrong, Assistant Secretary, Offices of the Cabinet.
- Ernest William Barltrop, DSO, OBE, Regional Controller, East and West Ridings Region, Ministry of Labour and National Service.
- Charles Lambert Bayne, MVO, Assistant Secretary, War Office.
- Frank Elliot Shirley Beavan, DSO, Director and General Manager, Mountstuart Dry Docks Company, Ltd.
- Alderman Herbert Bowles, JP, DL. For public services in Nottingham.
- Richard Conway Bridges, lately Assistant Solicitor, Board of Trade.
- Frederick Tom Brooks, LLD, FRS, Professor of Botany, Cambridge University.
- Frederick Stephen Button, JP, lately a member of the Industrial Court.
- Wilfred George Carter, MBE, Chief Designer, Gloster Aircraft Company.
- Stanley Beaumont Chamberlain, Head of the Printing Department, Bank of England.
- Edris Connell (Ninette de Valois), Director of the Sadlers Wells Ballet.
- Kathleen d'Olier Courtney, Chairman of the General Council of the United Nations Association.
- Reginald Arthur Davis, MBE, lately Deputy Director General of Royal Engineer Equipment, Ministry of Supply.
- Albert James Taylor Day, OBE, Chairman, Staff Side, Civil Service National Whitley Council.
- Basil Dean, MBE, Founder and lately Director General of the Entertainments National Service Association.
- William Dobbie, MP, Member of Parliament for Rotherham since 1933. For political and public services.
- Arthur Floyd, MInstCE, County Surveyor of West Sussex. Secretary of the County Surveyors' Society.
- Eric Donald Gannon, recently employed in a Department of the Foreign Office.
- Oswald Vernon Guy, DSO, MC, Secretary, Cambridge University Appointments Board.
- James Dewar Haggart, OBE, FSA, FRSA, Provost of Aberfeldy, Perthshire.
- Florence Mabel Hancock, OBE, National Woman Officer of the Transport and General Workers' Union.
- Frederick Jackman, FRIBA, Senior Architect, Ministry of Education.
- James Jamieson, MInstGasE, Engineer and Manager, Corporation Gas Department, Edinburgh.
- Charles Mark Jenkin Jones, Divisional General Manager, North Eastern Area, London and North Eastern Railway Company.
- Herbert Jones, lately Chairman of the Lincolnshire (Kesteven) War Agricultural Executive Committee.
- Thomas David Jones, MSc, PhD, FGS, MIME, Professor of Mining, University of Wales, and Director of the Mining Research Laboratory, University College, Cardiff.
- Ernest Martin Joseph, OBE, FRIBA, lately Director of Works and Buildings, Navy, Army and Air Force Institutes.
- James Louis Philip Kent, Superintendent, Ship Division, National Physical Laboratory, Department of Scientific and Industrial Research.
- William Errington Keville. For services to the Board of Trade in connection with sales of wool.
- Malcolm MacLeod MacCulloch, Chief Constable, City of Glasgow Police Force.
- Emily MacManus, OBE, lately Matron, Guy's Hospital.
- Captain Frank Heathcote Powys Maurice, Royal Navy (Retired), Director of Temporary Housing, Ministry of Works.
- Grahame Temple Meller, Administration Director, British Overseas Airways Corporation.
- Edward Bertram Monkhouse, Deputy Timber Controller, Board of Trade.
- Horace William Oclee, OBE, DL, Secretary, Territorial Army and Air Force Association of the County of Lancaster East.
- Harry Reginald Ould, Assistant Secretary, Air Ministry.
- Sydney Gordon Russell, MC, Chairman of the Board of Trade Advisory Panel of Designers of Utility Furniture.
- William Owen Lester Smith, Director of Education for Manchester.
- Stanley Feargus Steward, Director-General of Machine Tools, Ministry of Supply.
- Captain Joseph Edmund Stone, MC. For services to hospital organisation and administration. Consultant on Hospital Finance, King Edward VII Hospital Fund for London.
- James Boyce Stonebridge, Assistant Legal Adviser and Solicitor, Ministry of Agriculture and Fisheries.
- Matilda Theresa Talbot, MBE, Donor of the Lacock Abbey copy of Magna Carta to the Nation.
- Francis Carter Toy, DSc, Director of the British Cotton Industry Research Association.
- Thomas Wallace, MC, DSc, ARIC, Director of the University of Bristol of Agricultural and Horticultural Research Station, Long Ashton.
- Reginald Heber Webb, Assistant Secretary, Ministry of Pensions.
- Elisabeth Whyte, Assistant Secretary, Ministry of Labour and National Service.
- Hugh Young, Commander, Metropolitan Police.
- George Richard Frederick Bredin, Provincial Governor, Sudan Political Service.
- John Hellyer Liddell, formerly Chairman of the Shanghai Municipal Council.
- Dermot Francis MacDermot, until recently Senior Foreign Office Representative on the United Kingdom Liaison Mission to Japan.
- Hugh Charles McClelland, one of His Majesty's Consuls-General.
- Richard Thomas Windle. For services to the Anglo-American Observer Mission to Greece.
- Harold Arthur Langston Pattison, Director of Civil Aviation, Newfoundland.
- Andrew Henry Strachan, Secretary to the Treasury, Southern Rhodesia.
- John Hinton Fletcher, MC, Indian Service of Engineers, Superintending Engineer, Public Works Department, Irrigation Branch, Punjab.
- Robert Nigel Bright Brunt, General Manager, Burmah-Shell Oil Storage and Distributing Company of India, Limited, Bombay.
- Charles Marsden, Mill Agent, Ahmedabad, Bombay.
- Alan George Vere, General Manager, Bombay Telephone District, Bombay.
- Major Reginald Woodifield Appleby, VD. For public services in Bermuda.
- Eldred Curwen Braithwaite, OBE, MB, MS, FRCS.(Ed.), LRCP, D.Ph, Colonial Medical Service, Senior Specialist, Nigeria.
- Arthur Frederick Giles, OBE, Colonial Police Service, Assistant Inspector General of Police, Palestine.
- William Grazebrook, MC, Controller of Prices and Military Contracts, Kenya.
- Reginald Sydney Vernon Poulier, Food Commissioner (Control and Distribution), Ceylon.
- Harold Percy Rowe, OBE, Colonial Survey Service, Director of Lands and Mines, Tanganyika.
- Jehangir Hormusjee Ruttonjee, For courageous and loyal services during the enemy occupation of Hong Kong.
- Frederick George Winward, MBE, Director of Supplies, Sierra Leone.

Honorary Commanders

- Ja'afaru, Emir of Zaria, Nigeria.
- Majid Bey Abdul Hadi, Puisne Judge, Supreme Court, Palestine.

==== Officers of the Order of the British Empire (OBE) ====
Military Division

Royal Navy

- Commander John Herbert Bowen, (Retired).
- Superintendent Jessie Frith, Women's Royal Naval Service. (Retired).
- The Reverend Guy St. Leger Hyde Gosselin, Chaplain, (Retired).
- Lieutenant-Colonel (Acting Colonel Second Commandant) George Walter Montague Grover, Royal Marines.
- Acting Captain (A) John Benjamin Heath.
- Acting Captain (E) Glyn Hearson.
- Commander (S) Cyril George Neeves.
- Commander (S) Horace Geldard Oswin.
- Headmaster Commander George Roberts, (Retired).
- Commander Cyril Francis Tower, MVO.
- Acting Captain (E) Alex Julian Tyndale-Biscoe.
- Acting Commander (SP) Jack William Callaway, Royal Indian Naval Volunteer Reserve.

Additional Officers

In recognition of Operational Minesweeping service since the end of the War.

- Commander Kenneth Hillam Fraser, DSC.
- Commander David Lampen, DSO.
- Commander Cuthbert Morris Parry.

Army

- Lieutenant-Colonel Geoffrey Arthur Anstee, MC (13430), The Bedfordshire and Hertfordshire Regiment.
- Colonel Cecil Avery Baker (82549), Army Cadet Force.
- Lieutenant-Colonel (temporary) Peter James Barkham (79192), Royal Regiment of Artillery.
- Lieutenant-Colonel (temporary) Wilfred Montague Were Collins, MC (15516), The Dorsetshire Regiment.
- Lieutenant-Colonel (temporary) Cecil Edward Pihilpott Craven (22896), The Queen's Own Royal West Kent Regiment.
- Lieutenant-Colonel Herbert Shelton Dean, MC (11701), The Royal Ulster Rifles.
- Lieutenant-Colonel (temporary) Claude Hector Dewhurst (39037), The Royal Sussex Regiment.
- Lieutenant-Colonel (temporary) David James Donald (113941), Royal Regiment of Artillery.
- Lieutenant-Colonel (temporary) Eric Francis Edson, MB (154791), Royal Army Medical Corps.
- Colonel (local) Thomas Gilbert Lloyd Elliott (4559) The Duke of Cornwall's Light Infantry.
- Lieutenant-Colonel Richard William Feltrim Fagan, MC (1453), Royal Regiment of Artillery.
- Brevet Colonel Frederick James Finlow, TD, DL, JP (27690), Army Cadet Force.
- Lieutenant-Colonel (temporary) Thomas Albert Germaine (105567), The Border Regiment.
- Lieutenant-Colonel (temporary) Francis Norton Wentworth Gore (34434), Royal Regiment of Artillery.
- Lieutenant-Colonel (temporary) Arthur Lionel Hicks, BA (49862), Corps of Royal Engineers.
- Chief Commander (temporary) Cecil Winstanley Hull (192719), Auxiliary Territorial Service.
- Lieutenant-Colonel (temporary) Frank Danks Hutton (42981), Royal Army Ordnance Corps.
- Lieutenant-Colonel (Staff Paymaster Class I) (temporary) Leslie Henry Marc Mackenzie, MBE (10713), Royal Army Pay Corps.
- Lieutenant-Colonel (temporary) John Montagu Merrett (128512), Corps of Royal Engineers.
- Lieutenant-Colonel (temporary) Gerald John Pink (196806), Royal Regiment of Artillery.
- Colonel (acting) Stanley Richard, MC (225177), Royal Army Service Corps (Expeditionary Forces Institute).
- Lieutenant-Colonel (temporary) Gerald Richardson (282757), General List.
- Lieutenant-Colonel (temporary) Charles Alfred Stuart (90937), Royal Army Service Corps.
- Lieutenant-Colonel (temporary) Guy Owen Netterville Thompson (30560), Corps of Royal Engineers.
- Lieutenant-Colonel (temporary) Gerald Edward Thornton (13003), The Royal Sussex Regiment.
- Lieutenant-Colonel (temporary) Oliver George Trevithick (69231), Royal Electrical and Mechanical Engineers.
- Colonel (temporary) Henry Aloysius Twist (169167), Royal Army Educational Corps.
- Lieutenant-Colonel (temporary) William Ronald Denis Vernon-Harcourt (42284), The South Wales Borderers.
- Lieutenant-Colonel (temporary) Malcolm Holbeche Walters (464 I.A.), Royal Indian Army Service Corps.
- Lieutenant-Colonel (temporary) Frank Stanley Wareham (123201), General List.
- Lieutenant (Assistant Commissary) (Temporary Lieutenant-Colonel) Edmund John Stevens, MBE (Mes. 7-B), Military Engineering Service, Indian Army.
- Lieutenant-Colonel (Temporary Colonel) Robert Andrew Briggs (171.IA) 5th Royal Gurkha Rifles, Indian Army.
- Lieutenant-Colonel (Temporary Colonel) Ronald Harry Culley, (IA.925) The Rajput Regiment, Indian Army.
- Major Ernest Soysa, MB, BS, MRCP, MRCS, Ceylon Medical Corps.
- Major Vernon Cumberbatch Van Geyzel Kelaart, Ceylon Defence Force.

Royal Air Force

- Wing Commander John Frederick Hall (35124).
- Wing Commander Ernest Laurence Geoffrey Le Dieu (21178).
- Wing Commander David McLaren (35105).
- Wing Commander Barry Fitzgerald Moore (01210), Royal Air Force Volunteer Reserve.
- Wing Commander Frederick William Moxham, AFC (18178).
- Wing Commander Charles William Kelvin Nicholls, DSO (34224).
- Wing Commander John Kevitt Rotherham (05242).
- Wing Commander Norman Francis Simpson (36033).
- Acting Wing Commander William Robert Abercrombie Matheson (28065).
- Acting Wing Commander William Walmsley Watson (44245).
- Acting Squadron Leader Robert Allison Moorehead, MB, BCh (133495), Royal Air Force Volunteer Reserve.

Civil Division

- David Henry Alexander, MSc, AMIMechE, Principal, Municipal College of Technology, Belfast.
- Sidney Herbert Alison, lately Deputy Comptroller, London County Council.
- Alderman Charles William Allison, JP, for public services in Stockton-on-Tees.
- David Andrews, lately Fire Services Commander, National Fire Service, Northern Ireland.
- George Edward Bairsto, DSc, DEng, MIEE, FInstP, Senior Principal Scientific Officer, Ministry of Supply.
- Bernard Stuart Baker, Director of Supplies, HM Stationery Office.
- Colin Bartlett, Assistant to Chief Ship Surveyor, Lloyds Register of Shipping.
- Cyril Jack Bentley, Regional Officer for Birmingham and West Midlands, Assistance Board.
- Geoffrey Vaughan Blackstone, GM, Chief Regional Fire Officer, No. 8 (Wales) Region, National Fire Service.
- Lieutenant-Colonel John Noel Blenkin, MC, lately in charge of the Department of National Service Entertainment, Middle East.
- George Leslie Bond, MBE, Controller, Export Licensing Branch, Board of Trade.
- Lieutenant-Colonel Frederick Crichton Brown, County Army Welfare Officer for Berkshire.
- Frederick Augustus L'Estrange Burges, MBE, MRCS, LRCP, Post Office Medical Officer for the Hockley and Handsworth districts of Birmingham.
- George Thomas Cairncross, Postal Controller, Home Counties Region, General Post Office.
- May Eudora Campbell, JP, Chairman of the Women's Voluntary Services in Scotland.
- John Carson, JP, Manager, Liverpool Repair Works, Harland and Wolff, Ltd.
- Jack Granado Chester, MBE, Deputy Controller of Supplies, Ministry of Works.
- Percevale John Clarke, AMIEE, Chairman, Youth Hostels Association.
- Theodora Coatman, JP, Chairman, North West Regional Citizens' Clubs Council.
- Percival Pasley Cole, MB, ChB, FRCS, Senior Surgeon, Dreadnought Seamen's Hospital, Greenwich.
- David Clark Collins, Chief Executive Officer, Board of Trade.
- William Keith Cormack. Chief. Constable, Caithness County Police Force.
- George Frederick Craven, AMInstCE, MIME, MIEE, MInstT, General Manager and Engineer, Halifax Corporation Passenger Transport Department.
- Captain Arthur James Francis Danielli, MC, Assistant Accountant-General, Ministry of Health.
- Frank Dark, lately Deputy Accountant-General, Ministry of Education.
- Harry Day, lately Accountant, Office of the Receiver for the Metropolitan Police District.
- Alexander Dey, Naval Architect, Anchor Line, Ltd.
- Laurence Frank Easterbrook, Agricultural author and journalist.
- David Lewis Evans, Assistant Keeper, First Class, Public Record Office.
- Harry France, General President, National Union of Blastfurnacemen, Oreminers, Coke Workers and Kindred Trades.
- Leslie James Gardner, Chief Designer, "Britain Can Make It" Exhibition.
- Beatrice Gebhard, lately Matron, Central Middlesex County Hospital.
- Horace Coe George, Senior Inspector of Taxes, Exeter, Board of Inland Revenue.
- James White Gibb, Director of Alkali Division, Imperial Chemical Industries, Ltd.
- Walter Douglas Goss, National Secretary, Transport and General Workers' Union.
- Henry Powell Grabaskey, Assistant Director of Manning (Statistics), Air Ministry.
- John Green, General Works Manager, A. V. Roe and Company, Ltd.
- Councillor Ernest Greenhill, Vice-Chairman, Glasgow Savings Committee.
- Wing Commander George Edward Augustus Greensill, Chief Maintenance Officer, Central European District, Imperial War Graves Commission.
- Richard Alan Hacking, MSc, lately Controller of Production, Dorman Long and Company, Ltd.
- James Hall, MBE, Assistant Director of Navy Contracts, Admiralty.
- Augustus Richard Harman, Assistant Controller, Savings Department, General Post Office.
- Frederic Clare Hawkes, Honorary Secretary, Royal Air Force Pilots' and Crews' Fund Committee of the Auctioneers and Estate Agents' Institute.
- Benjamin John Herrington, Waterguard Superintendent, 1st Class, Board of Customs and Excise.
- Charles Alleyne Higgins, Senior Legal Assistant, Office of HM Procurator General and Treasury Solicitor.
- Alexander Davidson Hillhouse, Finance Director, Transport, Warehousing, Cold Storage and Salvage Divisions, Ministry of Food.
- Arthur Hillier, Chairman and Managing Director, Sperry Gyroscope Company, Ltd, Brentford.
- James Lansdale Hodson, Author and Journalist.
- Lawrence Steele Hoggarth, FSI, Chairman, Westmorland War Agricultural Executive Committee.
- Edward Carleton Studdert Holmes, Travelling Secretary, Central Advisory Council for Adult Education in HM Forces.
- Ernest James Henry Holt, Honorary Secretary, Amateur Athletic Association.
- Dudley Howe, JP, Chairman, Barry Juvenile Advisory Committee and Local Employment Committee.
- Enid Janet Mary Howell, Principal, Board of Trade.
- Samuel Leslie Hulme, Deputy Director of Telecommunications, Ministry of Civil Aviation.
- Harry Raper Humphries, Director of Animal Feeding Stuffs, Ministry of Food.
- Henry Joseph Hutter, MBE, Assistant Director (Accounts), Air Ministry.
- James Herbert Ireland, lately General Secretary, City of Belfast Young Men's Christian Association.
- Charles Grafton Izard, lately Secretary, Prudential Approved Societies.
- John Wynford George James, Chief Pilot, British European Airways Corporation.
- James Porter Jamison, JP, Chairman, County Tyrone Savings Committee, and Member of the Ulster Savings Committee.
- Frederick Robert Hurlstone-Jones, Chairman, Headmasters' Employment Committee.
- Oswald Jones, Chief Executive Officer, Ministry of National Insurance, Cardiff.
- William Jones, Regional Manager, Cardiff, War Damage Commission.
- Robert Kean, Director of the Federation of Civil Engineering Contractors.
- Thomas Calder Southwell Keely, Assistant Master, Supreme Court of Judicature.
- Stewart Kilpatrick, Chairman, United Kingdom Dependents Advisory Committee of the Dependents' Board of Trustees for the Dominion of Canada.
- Lionel King, AMInstCE, Assistant Director, Ministry of Supply.
- John Kirkwood, Interim Director of Studies, West of Scotland Agricultural College.
- Thomas Herbert Lewis, Chief Constable, Carmarthenshire.
- Douglas Wilson McAra, Senior Examiner, Board of Inland Revenue.
- John McAslan, JP, Chairman of the Committee for No. 321 Squadron, Air Training Corps.
- James Rhys Stuart MacLeod, Principal, Dominions Office.
- Ernest Maplesden, Principal, Ministry of Works.
- Frederick Robert Maude, FSI, Chief Surveyor of Lands, Admiralty.
- Violet Edith Seary-Mercer, Honorary Organising Secretary, Clothing Branch, Soldiers', Sailors' and Airmen's Families Association.
- Alderman Luther Frederick Milner, JP, Representative of Sheffield, National Savings Committee.
- Harold Filmer Minter, AMInstT, Deputy Director, Meat Section, Road Haulage Organisation, Ministry of Transport.
- David Francis Morgan, Legal and Parliamentary Secretary, Imperial Headquarters, Boy Scouts Association.
- The Reverend Stanley James Wells Morgan, JP, Chairman, Swanscombe Urban District Council.
- Arnold Morris, MInstCE, Senior Planning Inspector, Ministry of Town and Country Planning.
- Charles Stephen Mundy, Lately Assistant Director, Sea Transport Division, Ministry of Transport.
- James Harold Castell Newton, Deputy President, Incorporated Federated Association of Boot and Shoe Manufacturers of Great Britain and Ireland.
- John Oldham, JP, Representative of Denton on the North West Regional Industrial Savings Committee.
- Major Leslie Pardoe, Headmaster, Pershore County Modern School.
- Robert Henry Victor Hardie Park, Superintending Inspector, Ministry of Agriculture and Fisheries.
- John Parkin, MC, Assistant Secretary, Ministry of Supply.
- Elsa Rose Perkins, MBE, Honorary Director, Street Groups Department, National Savings Committee.
- Leonard Bessemer Pfeil, DSc, ARSM, Manager, Research and Development Department, Mond Nickel Company.
- Louis Pheasey, Superintending Examiner, Patent Office, Board of Trade.
- Arthur Gerald Pockett, Secretary, Civil Service War Distress Fund.
- Percival Pope, General Manager, Montague Burton, Ltd.
- David Doig Pratt, PhD, Assistant Director, Department of Scientific and Industrial Research.
- William Richardson, Executive Secretary, Overseas Supply Committee of the Petroleum Board.
- George Charles Ricketts, Assistant Regional Controller, Ministry of Labour and National Service.
- John Macgregor Ritchie, PhD, Honorary Superintendent and Secretary, Royal London Society for Teaching and Training the Blind.
- Henry Metford Rowe, Principal, Scottish Home Department.
- Joseph Thomas Bruce Sandercock, Vice-Chairman, National Federation of Building Trades Operatives.
- William Robert Sanders, Deputy Commander, Metropolitan Police.
- Edgar Hermann Joseph Schuster, DSc, lately member of the scientific staff of the Medical Research Council.
- Cecil Herbert Silver, Administrative Officer for Political Intelligence, India Office.
- Sydney William Smart, Superintendent of Operation, Southern Railway Company.
- Major Robert Smith, MC, Supervising Valuer (Dilapidations), War Office.
- Ralph Southcombe, ACA, President of the National Association of Glove Manufacturers.
- Thomas William Charles Starbuck, MBE, Assistant Director, British Red Shield Services, Salvation Army. Lieutenant-Colonel, Salvation Army.
- James Stewart, Principal Officer, Ministry of Commerce, Northern Ireland.
- Walter Allan Stewart, County Agricultural Organiser and Principal of the Northamptonshire Institute of Agriculture.
- James Strachan, lately Provost of Falkirk.
- Arthur Leslie Sutcliffe, Chairman, No. 1171 (Sowerby Bridge) Squadron, Air Training Corps.
- Robert George Thatcher, Principal, Ministry of Fuel and Power.
- Harral Thompon, Deputy Leather Controller, Board of Trade.
- Charles Herbert Thorpe, JP, Joint Honorary Secretary and Trustee, Royal Masonic Hospital, Hammersmith.
- Major William Howard Warman, Chief Livestock Inspector, Ministry of Food.
- Douglas Edward Webb, Police Staff Officer I, British Element, Allied Commission for Austria.
- Herbert Arthur Webb, Deputy Chief Inspector of Training, Ministry of Labour and National Service.
- Margaret Weddell, Principal, Manchester Training College of Domestic Economy.
- Vincent Joseph Wilkes, Coal Supplies Officer, South Staffordshire.
- John Henry Williams, Senior Civil Assistant, War Office.
- Geraldine Williamson, Regional Administrator, North Western Region, Women's Voluntary Services.
- William Charles Willis, Chief Engineer Officer, SS Orient City, Sir William Reardon Smith & Sons, Ltd.
- James Graham Willmore, MD, CM, MRCP, lately Principal Medical Officer, Ministry of Pensions.
- Charles Horace Wilmot, Director, Information Services Department, British Council.
- Leonard Ernest Wuille. For services to the Ministry of Food in connection with the distribution of fruit.
- Randle Reid-Adam, First Secretary (Commercial) at His Majesty's Embassy at Cairo.
- Edward Anthony Fulcher Ashton, First Secretary at His Majesty's Legation at La Paz.
- Henry Norman Brain, Consul on the Staff of the Special Commissioner in South East Asia.
- Alfred John Claxton, British Advocate, Sudan Government.
- Edward Uniacke Penrose Fitzgerald, First Secretary (Information) at His Majesty's Embassy at Mexico City (Now at His Majesty's Embassy at Madrid.)
- Joseph William Foster, JP. For services to the Anglo-American Observer Mission to Greece.
- John William Hawksley Grice, MRCS, LRCP, British subject resident in China.
- Alan Joseph Herbert, JP. For services to the Anglo-American Observer Mission to Greece.
- Henry Calverly Hinton, British subject resident in Madeira.
- Herbert Aubrey Mabey, attached to a Department of the Foreign Office.
- Mary Edith Nicholls, for services with the British Red Cross Society in South East Asia.
- John Kingston O'Donoghue, MBE. On the staff of the Political Adviser to the Commander-in-Chief, Germany.
- John Bradbury Lanham Titchener, Far Eastern Publicity Division of Supreme Allied Command, South East Asia.
- Richard Bartram Boyd Tollinton, First Secretary and Consul on the Staff of the British Political Representative in Bulgaria.
- Maurice Wood, British subject resident in the United States of America.
- James Arthur Banks, MBE, Chairman, West of Scotland Branch, Empire Societies' War Hospitality Committee.
- Kenneth McKenzie Brown, President, Fishermen's Protective Union, Newfoundland. For public services.
- Henry Norman Burt, Chief Appraiser, Department of Customs, Newfoundland.
- Charles Havilland Douglas Chepmell, formerly Clerk of the Legislative Council, State of Tasmania.
- George Dey, For municipal and public services in Port Pirie, State of South Australia.
- Basil Benjamin Hill, MC, ED, Headmaster, Umtali High School, Southern Rhodesia.
- James Hopwood, Chief Superintendent of Transportation, Rhodesia Railways, Limited.
- William Thomas Martin, Superintendent of Primary Education, State of South Australia.
- Louis McCusbin, Director of the National Gallery, State of South Australia.
- Ralph John Morton, MC, Attorney General, Southern Rhodesia.
- Kenneth Nolan, Chairman of the Chamber of Commerce, Basutoland. For public services.
- Gilbert Graham Poole, Resident Engineer, Engineering and Water Supply Department, State of South Australia.
- John Alexander Von Alwyn, of Launceston, State of Tasmania, State President for Northern Tasmania, Bush Nursing Association.
- Dermont Campbell Barty, Indian Civil Service, District Magistrate, Hyderabad, Sind.
- Henry Norman Brock, Divisional Transportation Superintendent, Great Indian Peninsula Railway, Jhansi.
- Samuel Chad Wick, General Manager, The Buckingham and Carnatic Company Limited, Madras.
- Christopher Arthur Cookson, Manager, Laxmi-Vishnu Mills, Sholapur, Bombay.
- Major John Richard Cotton, MBE, Indian Army, Indian Political Service, lately Secretary to the Honourable the Resident at Baroda and for the States of Western India and Gujarat.
- Sydney Joseph Curtis, MC, Indian Forest Service, Conservator of Forests, Southern Circle, Bengal.
- Percy Harold Davy, Director of Aeronautical Inspection, Civil Aviation Directorate, Government of India.
- Lieutenant-Colonel Geoffry Forbes Skene Keating, 14th Punjab Regiment, Indian Army, attached Zhob Militia, Baluchistan.
- James White Meldrum, Indian Civil Service, Secretary to the High Commissioner for India in the Union of South Africa.
- Maharaj Kumar Paljor Tendup Namgyal, Heir-apparent of Sikkim State.
- William Bertram Neilson, AMInstCE, Chartered Civil Engineer, Director of Ordnance Factories.
- Charles Reynolds Nodder, Director, Technological Research Laboratories, Indian Central Jute Committee, Calcutta.
- Henry Joseph Pearson, MBE, Deputy Secretary to the Government of the Punjab in the Finance Department.
- Charles Robertson Ovens Robertson, Indian Police, Central Intelligence Officer, United Provinces and Ajmer, Lucknow.
- Major (temporary Lieutenant-Colonel) William Sandison, DSO, Indian Army, Commandant, Tochi Scouts, North-West Frontier Province.
- Major George Sherriff, Indian Army, of Tashi Ding, Kalimpong, Bengal.
- Cecil John Louis Stokoe, Civilian Manager, Bird and Company, New Delhi.
- Albert Ernest Wright, Collector of Central Excise, Calcutta.
- U Aye Maung II, Burma Service of Engineers, Class I, Chief Engineer, Public Works Department, Irrigation Branch.
- George Pfaff, MBE, Burma Veterinary Service, Class I, Research Officer and Principal, Veterinary College, Insein.
- Abang Haji Mustapha, Datu Bandar of Sarawak.
- Colonel Oliver Hugh Reginald Beadles, Controller of Supplies, Malayan Union.
- Peter Fitzherbert Campbell, Colonial Administrative Service, Assistant Colonial Secretary, Barbados.
- Robert George Dakin. For public services in Uganda.
- Alfred John Ernest Davis, Deputy Head of a Department of the Crown Agents for the Colonies. For services with the British Colonies Supply Mission, Washington.
- Pierre Francois Joseph Louis Rathier Du Vergé, MC, MRCS, LRCP, Medical Superintendent, Victoria Hospital, Mauritius.
- Lieutenant-Colonel Ernest Gordon Fish, Colonial Police Service, Commissioner of Police, Zanzibar.
- Samuel Moore Gilbert, Colonial Agricultural Service, Chief Scientific Officer, Coffee Research and Experimental Station, Lyamungu, Tanganyika.
- John Gutch, Colonial Administrative Service, Under Secretary (Political), Palestine.
- James Herbert Jenkins, Controller of Supplies, Seychelles.
- The Right Reverend Thomas Sylvester Claudius Johnson, BD, Assistant Bishop of Sierra Leone.
- Curtis Daniel Johnston, MD, CM, Medical Officer, Black River District, Jamaica.
- Kwan Po Chan, For services to the University during the enemy occupation of Hong Kong.
- The Venerable Lackland Augustus Lennon, MBE. For public services in Nigeria.
- William George Noel Lightfoot, Establishment Officer, Northern Rhodesia.
- Arthur John Loveridge, Colonial Administrative Service, Judicial Adviser, Gold Coast.
- William Thomas Mackell, Colonial Education Service, Chief Inspector of Education, Nigeria.
- Thomas Percy Fergus McNeice, Colonial Administrative Service, Secretary for Social Welfare, Singapore.
- Michael Aldwyn Maillard, for public services in Trinidad.
- Patrick William Robertson Petrie, MB, ChB, DTM&H. For medical services in the Aden Protectorate.
- Frederick Walter Shaftain, Colonial Police Service, Superintendent of Police, Hong Kong.
- Colin Smee, MC, Colonial Agricultural Service, Entomologist, Agricultural Department, Nyasaland.
- Edgar Staines, Custodian of Enemy Property, retired Registrar, Superior Courts, Malta.
- Neil Archibald Campbell Weir, ED, Colonial Administrative Service, Senior Commissioner, Gambia.
- Claude Vibart Wight, For public services in British Guiana.

Honorary Officers

- Chief John Manga Williams. For loyal and valuable services in the Cameroons.
- Solomone Ula Ata, Prime Minister of Tonga in the Western Pacific.
- Moshe G. Levin, President of the Jewish Community, Haifa, Palestine.
- Sheikh Mohammed bin Hilal el Barwani. For public services in Zanzibar.

==== Members of the Order of the British Empire (MBE) ====
Military Division

Royal Navy

- Lieutenant-Commander William Barber, (Retired).
- Wardmaster Lieutenant Frederick Charles Birch.
- Captain (Quartermaster) James Leonard Ferneyhough, Royal Marines.
- Acting Lieutenant-Commander Louis Button Geofroy, Trinidad Royal Naval Volunteer Reserve.
- Mr. Walter Gilbert Griffiths, Temporary Warrant Mechanician.
- Acting Lieutenant-Commander James Desmond Rea Haslett, DSC, Royal Naval Volunteer Reserve.
- Mr. Thomas Hollins, Temporary Acting Commissioned Master-at-Arms.
- Temporary Lieutenant (A) John Mail, Royal New Zealand Naval Volunteer Reserve.
- Acting Lieutenant-Commander (E) Edward Hilton Webster Platt.
- First Officer Rosemary Sheepshanks, Women's Royal Naval Service.

Additional Members

In recognition of Operational Minesweeping service since the end of the War.

- Temporary Lieutenant (S) John Desmond Cawthra, Royal Naval Volunteer Reserve.
- Mr. Alfred James Eames, Commissioned Engineer.

Army

- Captain (temporary) Cecil Somerset Alden (110194), Royal Pioneer Corps.
- Major (temporary) (Quartermaster) Sidney Fenn Aston (100671), General List.
- Captain (temporary) Geoffrey Herbert Beale (238282), Intelligence Corps.
- Captain (temporary) James Patrick Beatt (174406), Royal Armoured Corps.
- Major (Staff Paymaster Class II) (temporary) Thomas Blackett (101526), Royal Army Pay Corps.
- Major (temporary) John Alexander Smith Brown (169187), Royal Corps of Signals.
- Major (temporary) Anthony Stanley Bullivant (66162), 16th/5th Lancers, Royal Armoured Corps.
- Major (temporary) Ian Rupert Burrows (117327), The Middlesex Regiment (Duke of Cambridge's Own).
- Major Gilbert Henry Hooper Collins, AMIEE, AMIMechE (69659), Royal Electrical and Mechanical Engineers.
- Major (temporary) Leslie Herbert Conybeer (188808), Royal Army Ordnance Corps.
- Major (temporary) Howard Charles Crawley (193770), Royal Indian Army Service Corps.
- Captain Herbert Francis Crawley, MM, (136901), The Dorsetshire Regiment.
- No. 387384 Warrant Officer Class I Walter Frederick Cromey, Army Physical Training Corps.
- Major (temporary) Henry Nelson Curwen (129574), The Queen's Own Cameron Highlanders.
- Junior Commander (temporary) Barbara Bowes Dale-Green (244807), Auxiliary Territorial Service.
- Lieutenant-Colonel (Staff Paymaster Class I) (temporary) Charles Owen Davies (114184), Royal Army Pay Corps.
- The Reverend Hamlyn Llewellyn Rees Davies, BA (116167), Chaplain to the Forces, Fourth Class, Royal Army Chaplain's Department.
- Captain (D.O.) John Thomas Fitzgerald (202580), Royal Regiment of Artillery.
- Major (Staff Paymaster Class II) (temporary) Louis Frank Frisby (112176), Royal Army Pay Corps.
- Major (temporary) Laurie John Harry Gardner (167527), Army Catering Corps.
- Major (temporary) Gerald Joyce Gill, (168229), Army Catering Corps.
- Major (temporary) Ronald George Gosling (220596), Royal Regiment of Artillery.
- Major (temporary) Bernard Beaumont Hill, (19205), Royal Army Ordnance Corps.
- Major (temporary) (Quartermaster) Edward Hills (127482), Royal Army Medical Corps.
- Major William George Jago, TD (24877), Royal Tank Regiment, Royal Armoured Corps.
- No. 5767448 Warrant Officer Class II Ernest Frederick Jolley, The Royal Norfolk Regiment.
- Major (temporary) Frank Kent (167603), Corps of Royal Engineers.
- Senior Commander Margaret Cochrane Law (211298), Auxiliary Territorial Service.
- Lieutenant-Colonel William John Mackay (49247), Army Cadet Force.
- Major John Charles Pengelley Madden-Gaskell, TD (20596), Royal Regiment of Artillery.
- Major (Acting) Robert Macfie Marquis, MB, (291139), Royal Army Medical Corps.
- No. 5/126777 Warrant Officer Class I Gordon Hammerton Mellor, Royal Army Service Corps.
- No. 1418907 Warrant Officer Class I Edward George Middlemass, Royal Regiment of Artillery.
- Major (Quartermaster) William Kinchela Miller (47888), The South Wales Borderers.
- Major Richard Edward Moody (767), The Royal Inniskilling Fusiliers.
- No. 6910582 Warrant Officer Class I Robert James Morley, Corps of Royal Engineers.
- No. T/34637 Warrant Officer Class I Frederick Ernest Newman, Royal Army Service Corps.
- Major (temporary) George Henry Northey (77777), King's Royal Rifle Corps.
- Major (temporary) Wilfred Oliver (116663), Royal Army Service Corps.
- Junior Commander (temporary) Sophie Portal (196358), Auxiliary Territorial Service.
- Major (temporary) Ivor Powell (152382), Corps of Royal Engineers.
- Major Thomas Horace Redford, TD (20860), Royal Regiment of Artillery.
- Lieutenant Frederick Henry Richards (146084), Corps of Royal Engineers.
- Major (temporary) Lionel Frank Rixson (267378), Royal Corps of Signals.
- Captain (temporary) Shafiq Ahmad Khan, Indian Pioneer Corps.
- Major (temporary) Henry Macaulay Shellard (124948), Royal Army Service Corps.
- Lieutenant-Colonel James Ramsey Lochead Sloan (286048), Army Cadet Force.
- Captain Frederick Speakes (234663), Royal Corps of Signals.
- Captain (Quartermaster) Percy William George Steele (356537), Royal Corps of Signals.
- Major (temporary) Claude Hugh Morley Toye (186806), Royal Regiment of Artillery.
- Captain Joyce Tozer, East African Women's Territorial Service.
- Major (temporary) John Tyler (142934), Royal Pioneer Corps.
- Captain (temporary) Cecil Romeo Eugene Warner (263881), Royal Army Service Corps.
- The Reverend Edward James Warner (104856), Chaplain to the Forces, Third Class (temporary), Royal Army Chaplains' Department.
- Major Herbert Waugh (286575), Army Cadet Force.
- War Substantive Captain (Temporary Major) Ronald Harry Culley, (OS/216) Indian Army Ordnance Corps.
- Lieutenant (Assistant Commissary) (Temporary Captain) (Deputy Commissary) James Patrick O'Brien, (OS/56) Indian Army Ordnance Corps.
- War Substantive Captain (Temporary Major) George Herald Heithus, (EC.205772) Indian Electrical and Mechanical Engineers.
- War Substantive Captain (Temporary Major) Wyndham Garfield Frost, (EC.8788) 2nd Gurkha Rifles, Indian Army.
- Senior Commander Mary Joyce Young (WAC/153) Women's Auxiliary Corps (India).
- Sergeant-Major Frederick Charles Jones, Hong Kong Volunteer Defence Corps.
- Major (temporary) Omer Faik Muftizade, The Cyprus Regiment.

Royal Air Force

- Acting Squadron Leader Henry James Carter, DFC (104474), Royal Air Force Volunteer Reserve.
- Acting Squadron Leader William Cyril Johnson (64420), Royal Air Force Volunteer Reserve.
- Acting Squadron Leader Frank Ernest Jones (106000), Royal Air Force Volunteer Reserve.
- Acting Squadron Leader John Mochrie (43597).
- Acting Squadron Leader Frank Harry Taylor, Southern Rhodesian Air Force.
- Acting Squadron Leader John Percy Ward (80601), Royal Air Force Volunteer Reserve.
- Flight Lieutenant Ralph Brown, DFM, (45685).
- Acting Flight Lieutenant Edward Arthur Brace (188033), Royal Air Force Volunteer Reserve.
- Acting Flight Lieutenant Francis Edward Murphy (50250).
- Flying Officer George Hatton King (50782).
- Warrant Officer William John Ainger (511799).
- Warrant Officer Frederick Grant Ireland (533260).
- Warrant Officer Victor Soulsby Peel (365927).
- Warrant Officer Donald Burford Rushmore (513862).
- Warrant Officer Alfred Richard Springham (370305). Royal Air Force.
- Acting Warrant Officer Paul Frettsome (591441).

Civil Division

- Mark John Abbs, lately Sub-Inspector, HM Coastguard, North Eastern Division, Ministry of Transport.
- John Adair, JP, General Secretary, Durham Aged Mineworkers' Homes Association.
- Horace Aidley, Secretary, Railways Staff Conference, London, Midland and Scottish Railway Company.
- Lilian Florence Alcock, Executive Officer, HM Treasury.
- Henry Morton Anderson, Honorary Secretary, County Armagh Savings Committee. Member, Ulster Savings Committee.
- Councillor Joseph Armstrong, JP. For public services in the County of Durham.
- William Orwin Atkinson, Honorary Secretary, Acton Savings Committee.
- Frederick Stanley Back, Staff Officer, Admiralty.
- Dora Louisa, Lady Backhouse. For services in the distribution of knitted garments for the Royal Navy.
- George William Baldock, Head of Branch, Ministry of Food.
- Roland Arthur Barber, lately Secretary, Northamptonshire War Agricultural Executive Committee.
- Catherine Barne, Civil Assistant, War Office.
- Hester Maud Vere Barrington, Travelling Clothing Officer, Women's Voluntary Services.
- George Millar Beattie, Higher Clerical Officer, Department of Agriculture for Scotland.
- Betty Belson, Secretary, Midlands Regional Board for Industry, Board of Trade.
- Harry Stanley Bickell, Civil Assistant to the Director of Dockyards, Admiralty.
- Alan William Biddlecombe, Assistant Engineer, Telephone Development and Maintenance Branch, General Post Office.
- Joseph Blewitt, JP, Area Secretary, Transport and General Workers' Union, Midlands Area No. 5.
- Ernest Henry Bolton, Higher Executive Officer, Ministry of Town and Country Planning.
- George Bradford, Staff Officer, Air Ministry.
- William James Brawn, Staff Officer, HM Stationery Office.
- Pearl Bridger, Staff Officer, General Post Office.
- Sydney George Gardiner Brookman, Superintendent of Works, Ministry of Works.
- Robert Edward Bruce, Principal Staff Officer, War Office.
- Olive Rosamund Buchanan, Commander, First Aid Nursing Yeomanry Headquarters, Allied Land Forces, South East Asia.
- Lionel Victor Bull, Senior Staff Officer, Board of Inland Revenue.
- Rowland Arthur Bull, Honorary Secretary, Tiverton and District Savings Committee.
- Ronald Cowper Burton, lately Senior Army Welfare Officer, Hull.
- Thomas Leith Butler, Regional Commissioner, National Savings Committee.
- Jessie Maud Cardozo, RRC, Chief Health Nurse, Municipal Borough of Poplar.
- Samuel Carlisle. For services to the Belfast Corporation Transport Department.
- Major James Samuel Carson, MIME, Chairman, Backworth Miners' Welfare Institute.
- John Cross Carson, Director, John Murray, Ltd, Coatbridge.
- Alderman William Alfred James Case, JP, Member, Wiltshire War Agricultural Executive Committee.
- Percy Cheetham, Manchester Representative, National Savings Committee.
- Ernest Costain Clegg, Cartographer. For services to the Women's Land Army.
- Perceval Aljan Collins, Unit Controller, Road Haulage Organisation, Kidderminster.
- Cecil Tom Cripps, Area Organiser, British Sailors' Society Hostels, Canteens and Mobile Canteens, Portsmouth.
- Percy Ernest Crisp. Employed in a Department of the Foreign Office.
- Ernest Crossley, District Locomotive Superintendent, Edge Hill, London Midland and Scottish Railway Company.
- Benjamin Thomas Crowe, Divisional Officer, No. 24 (Birmingham) Fire Force, National Fire Service.
- Herbert Edward Cushnie, JP, District Organiser, Brighton, National Amalgamated Society of Operative House and Ship Painters and Decorators.
- Percival Theodore James Dadley, Higher Clerical Officer, Ministry of Health.
- Margaret Rhoda Munro Dallas, Staff Officer, Ministry of Supply.
- Douglas Dalzell, Chief Representative of the United Kingdom Commercial Corporation in the Sudan.
- Ernestine Winifred Dandridge, Honorary Divisional Secretary, Worthing and Lancing, Soldiers', Sailors' and Airmen's Families Association.
- Dorothy Elizabeth Davis, Senior Executive Officer, Ministry of National Insurance.
- John Alexander Dormann, Senior Staff Officer, Board of Trade.
- Anne Isabel Douglas, Member, Agricultural Executive Committee for Lanarkshire.
- William Orr Dowling, Assistant Manager, Engine Works, Harland and Wolff, Ltd, Belfast.
- Leonard Marshall Driscoll, Assistant II, Airborne Forces Experimental Establishment, Ministry of Supply.
- Alexander Robert Dunbar, Assistant Superintendent, Southern Area, London and North Eastern Railway Company.
- Arthur Frank Ebert, Senior Trade Officer, Ministry of Food.
- Alexander Robertson Edmiston, Manager, Palmers Dry Dock, Prince of Wales Dry Dock Company (Swansea), Ltd.
- James Edward, Regional Fuel Engineer, Scotland, Ministry of Fuel and Power.
- Sydney Fred Elverd, Grand Secretary and Treasurer, Grand United Order of Odd Fellows' Friendly Society.
- Amos Fairbrother, Senior Staff Officer, Board of Inland Revenue.
- William Farnorth, Secretary, North Western Area, Road Haulage Association.
- Albert Edward Featherstone, Senior Executive Officer, Ministry of National Insurance.
- Thomas Francis Fitz-Gibbon, Assistant Controller of Administration, Department of National Service Entertainment.
- Walter James Fletcher, Head of Branch, Ministry of Works.
- Donald Jack Frost, Sub-District Manager, Road Transport Organisation, Ipswich.
- Ernest David Fryer, Senior Executive Officer, Ministry of Transport.
- Charles Foreman Garland, Higher Clerical Officer, Offices of the Cabinet.
- Hempson Gates, Inspector of Stamping, Board of Inland Revenue.
- Christian Grace Gatey, Secretary, Labour and Cereals Committees, National Farmers Union.
- Peter Gillan Gaylor, Column Officer, National Fire Service, Northern Ireland.
- Eileen Rosemary German. For services to the Leicestershire Prisoners of War Comforts Fund.
- Frank Gillett, Deputy Controller of Footwear, Board of Trade.
- Leon Gillis, MB, BCh, MChOrth, DLO, FRCS, FRCS(Ed), Senior Surgeon, Ministry of Pensions.
- Richard Fred Golsworthy, Staff Clerk, Office of HM Procurator General and Treasury Solicitor.
- George Reginald Gordon, Principal Surveyor, Tithe Redemption Commission.
- Reginald Walter Greening, Senior Executive Officer, Ministry of Labour and National Service.
- John Foulds Haddow. For services to the Ministry of Food in Scotland.
- John Daglish Hadfield, Chief Draughtsman (Shipyard), Swan, Hunter and Wigham Richardson, Ltd, Newcastle upon Tyne.
- George Edward Hance, Registrar, Foreign Office.
- Robert John Hastings, Chairman, South Ayrshire Savings Committee.
- George Richard Hawtin, Station Superintendent, British Overseas Airways Corporation.
- Ethel Mary Bassett Haythornthwaite, Honorary Secretary, Sheffield and Peak District Branch, Council for the Preservation of Rural England.
- Alice Winifred Heap, Honorary Secretary, Ardgay and District Savings Group.
- Major William Thomas Henry, Director, Overseas Service, Incorporated Soldiers', Sailors' and Airmen's Help Society.
- Doris Elizabeth Hewson, Secretary and Treasurer, National Association for Employment of Regular Sailors, Soldiers and Airmen.
- Thomas John Hill, Customs Officer, Board of Customs and Excise.
- George Payne Hobdell, Staff Officer, Government Chemist's Department.
- Douglas Alfred Horsman, Deputy Principal Production Officer, Admiralty.
- Captain Griffith Hughes, Army Welfare Officer, Pwllheli.
- John Williams Hughes, Chairman, Hornsey Branch, British Legion.
- William Edward Hughes, Honorary Secretary, Cardiff Savings Committee.
- Ellen Mary Ibberson, Director, Rural Music Schools Association.
- Ellen Elizabeth Inman, Senior Probation Officer, London Probation Service.
- Councillor Thomas Frederick Edwin Jakeman, South Western Region Representative, National Savings Committee.
- Mary Frances Johnston, Staff Officer, Ministry of Labour and National Insurance, Northern Ireland.
- Captain Angus Colin Duncan Johnstone, ED, Field Supervisor, United Nations Relief and Rehabilitation Association, Warendorf, North Rhine and Westphalia Regions.
- Edwin Leonard Lloyd-Jones, Senior Sanitary Inspector, Rhyl Urban District.
- James Jones, Secretary and Director, John Nicholson and Sons, Ltd, Leeds.
- Herbert Joys. For services to Charities in Grimsby.
- Avice Dorothea Langdale Kellam, Organising Secretary, Victoria League Colonial Bureau.
- Henry Edwin Kemp, Outdoor Carriage and Wagon Assistant, Southern Railway Company.
- Arthur David Kent, AMIEE, Chief of Testing Department, Marconi's Wireless Telegraph Company, Ltd, Chelmsford.
- John Edmund King, Senior Staff Officer, Colonial Office.
- Douglas Hyndman Lang, Shipyard Manager, William Denny and Brothers, Ltd, Dumbarton.
- Margaret Home Lauder. For services to War Charities in Scotland.
- William Revell Lauder. For services to the wounded in Liverpool.
- Christina Cunningham Lawson, Assistant Matron, Western General Hospital, Edinburgh.
- Albert Edward Leek, General Manager and Director, Distington Engineering Company, Ltd.
- Margaret Sophy Logan, Seamen's Welfare Worker, Glasgow.
- Catherine London, Superintendent of District Midwives' Home, General Lying-in-Hospital, London.
- Winifred Mary McAllister, Matron of the British Red Cross Clinic for Rheumatism and Principal of the School of Hydrotherapy.
- Donald Leslie McIntosh, Superintendent, Langside School for the Deaf, Glasgow.
- Councillor Charles Garrett Mack, JP, Commandant, Bootle Special Constabulary.
- Colin May Mackenzie, Head of Schools Section, Ministry of Education.
- Donald Shaw MacKinnon, FSA(Scot.), Honorary Secretary, Association of Highland Societies of Edinburgh.
- Arthur Edward Martin, Assistant Chief Constable of Devonshire.
- James Mather, Chief Clerk, Territorial Army and Air Force Association of the County of Lancaster East.
- Thomas Joseph Matthews, Works Manager, Metal and Produce Recovery Depot, Eaglescliffe, Co. Durham.
- Edith Maycock, Member of the National Executive, National Union of Tailors and Garment Workers.
- Dorothy Melville, Matron, Belfast Municipal Hospital for Children.
- William Josiah Merrett, Superintendent, Printing Branch, Office of the Receiver for the Metropolitan Police District.
- Henry Guy Merson, Senior Executive Officer, Home Office.
- Violet Eda Miller. For services to the British United Aid to China Fund.
- Patrick Mockler, Lately Superintendent, Imperial Smelting Corporation, Ltd, Avonmouth.
- William Harold Moore, Divisional Officer, Eastern Area of Scotland, National Fire Service.
- Horace Moreton, Member of the National Executive Committee, National Union of Railwaymen.
- Henry Herbert Morgan, Higher Executive Officer, Ministry of Pensions.
- Seward Noel Morgan, Assistant Manager, John I. Thornycroft and Company, Ltd, London.
- William John Morison, Chief Engineer, Eastern National Omnibus Company, Ltd, Chelmsford.
- John White Mowatt, Superintendent and Deputy Chief Constable, Banff County Police Force.
- Arthur William Mundy, Civilian Clerical Officer, War Office.
- Thomas Edward Naughten, Staff Clerk, Ministry of Labour and National Service.
- Frederick Braithwaite Nichols, Chief Superintendent of Traffic, Telephone Manager's Office, West Area, London, General Post Office.
- Bertha Nicholson, Superintendent Nurse, Scarthoe Road Infirmary, Grimsby.
- Charles Stuart Ogilvy, LRCP, LRCS(Ed.), LRFPS, Civil Medical Practitioner, Military Detention Barracks, Sowerby Bridge.
- Bertram Oliver, Relieving Officer, Enfield East District, Middlesex.
- David Orr, Honorary Secretary, County Down Savings Committee. Member, Ulster Savings Committee.
- Priscilla Margaret Padmore, Headmistress, Christ Church Primary School, Bradford-on-Avon.
- Harry Stanley Pallant, Staff Officer, Board of Customs and Excise.
- Eva May Parsons, Employed in a Department of the Foreign Office.
- Robert Parsons, Superintendent, Royal Victoria, Albert and King George V Docks, Port of London Authority.
- John Mackenna Pearson, Director of the British Council Centre, Liverpool.
- Thelma Marion Pembroke, Chief Welfare Officer, Red Cross Hospital Welfare Service in North-West Europe.
- Adelaide Pentecost, Librarian, Crown Film Unit, Central Office of Information.
- Lionel Alfred Peterson, District House Coal Officer, Midland Region.
- Wilfrid James Phillips, Secretary, British Red Cross Society.
- Albert John Plaice, Senior Staff Officer, Patent Office, Board of Trade.
- Harold Player, Member, Schools Advisory Sub-Committee, National Savings Committee.
- Albert Edward Porter, Senior Staff Officer, Air Ministry.
- George Henry Porter, District Organiser, National Society of Painters. Chairman, Workers Panel, Joint Council for the Building and Civil Engineering Industry, Northern Ireland.
- Lilian Louise Poueits, Assistant Matron, Royal Infirmary, Liverpool.
- Sarah Anne Raby, Headmistress, The Magdalen Hospital Classifying School, Streatham.
- Evelyn Radford, Joint Founder of the Falmouth Opera Singers.
- Maisie Radford, Joint Founder of the Falmouth Opera Singers.
- Edward Walter Reading, Senior Executive Officer, Ministry of Supply.
- Katherine Rees, County Organiser, Swansea, Women's Voluntary Services.
- Mary Winifred Richards, Chief Superintendent of Typists, Ministry of Education.
- Squadron Leader Barkel Cornelius James Rickard, Royal Air Force Volunteer Reserve, Commanding Officer, Plymouth Wing, Air Training Corps.
- John Douglas Roberson, Technical Representative for Dunlop Rubber Company, Ministry of Supply Aeroplane and Armament Experimental Establishment.
- Emrys Haddon Roberts, MSc, JP, Chairman, Machynlleth and District Savings Committee.
- Dorothy Gladys Rothwell, MSc, JP, County Borough Organiser, Salford, Women's Voluntary Services.
- John Rouse, Staff Officer, Ministry of Fuel and Power.
- Alfred George Ernest Russell, Headmaster, Lancing Senior School, West Sussex.
- Theresa Scurfield, Higher Clerical Officer, Foreign Office.
- Herbert Basil Sheasby, FCA, FSAA, Secretary, National Council of Wholesale Egg Distributors and of other Wholesale Trade Associations.
- Samuel Sheppard, lately Local Fuel Overseer, Alcester Rural District Council.
- Marion Cockburn Shuttleworth, Divisional Commandant and Honorary Secretary, Fulham and Putney Division, County of London Branch, British Red Cross Society.
- Major Leonard Ernest Silcox, DSO, Engineer, Wales and Monmouth Division, Ministry of Transport.
- Walter Sim, Secretary, Roofing Felt Industry Executive Committee.
- Harold Herbert Edmund Simmonds, Staff Officer, British Museum.
- Arthur Smart, Higher Executive Officer, India Office.
- Arthur Cecil Wood-Smith, Secretary, Nurses' Insurance Society.
- Edna Helen Smith, Personal Assistant to the South Eastern Regional Controller, Ministry of Fuel and Power.
- Harold Soar, Manager, Middlesbrough Employment Exchange, Ministry of Labour and National Service.
- Joseph Soar, Mus.D, FRCO, ARCM, Honorary Secretary of St. David's Lifeboat, Royal National Lifeboat Institution.
- William Johnstone Stewart, Engineering Manager, Marine Department, Caledon Shipbuilding and Engineering Company, Ltd, Dundee.
- Frederick White Stokes, Deputy Assistant Controller, Post and Telecommunications Branch, British Element, Control Commission for Germany.
- Edmund Stone, Governor of the Royal Hospitals of Bridewell and Bethlem.
- Adeline Bertha Straughan, Regional Inspector of Clerical Establishments, Midland Region, General Post Office.
- Charles Herbert Sutherby, Chief Office Clerk, Committee and Private Bill Office, House of Commons.
- Trinette Taylor, Higher Grade Clerk, Ministry of Agriculture and Fisheries.
- Clara Gwendoline Thompson, JP, Sister-in-Charge, Blood Transfusion Service, Wales.
- Grace Thomson, Clothing Officer, Women's Voluntary Services in Scotland.
- Mary Evelyn Thomson, RRC, Matron of the Infirmary. Royal Hospital, Chelsea.
- Maurice Tomlinson, Member of Committee, No.'s. 1036 and 1969 (Bury) Squadron, Air Training Corps.
- Cecil Tull, Civil Assistant and Accountant, Grade I, Air Ministry.
- Gladys Mary Turner, Manager, Ministry of Supply Storage Depot, Strensham.
- Henry Arthur Turpin, Station Master, Cannon Street, Southern Railway Company.
- Edgar Ernest Turtle, MSc, PhD, FRIC, Senior Technical Officer, Ministry of Food.
- Councillor Alice Kate Louisa Venning, Member, Bristol Local Employment Committee and Juvenile Advisory Committee.
- Arthur Harold Wagstaff, Chief Clerk of the Birmingham County Court and of the District Registry of the High Court of Justice.
- Hazel Joan Randall Walker, lately employed in a Department of the Foreign Office.
- Iolanthe Wallis, Staff Officer, Ministry of Works.
- Stephen Ward, Chairman, Wellington District Committee of Salop War Agricultural Executive Committee.
- Percy Charles Warring, Chief Office Clerk, Table Office, House of Commons.
- Bert Watts, Assistant Divisional Officer, Ministry of Agriculture and Fisheries.
- James Albert Weekly, Senior Staff Officer, Ministry of Civil Aviation.
- Derek Alfred Hutton-Williams, Deputy Director of Housing, Ministry of Supply.
- Elizabeth Dorothy Williams, Headmistress, Winton Modern Girls' School, Eccles.
- Francis Henry Williams, Senior Examiner, Regional Office, Leeds, War Damage Commission.
- William Henry Williams, Local Fuel Overseer, County Borough of East Ham.
- William John Williams, Divisional Superintendent, Londonderry Division, St. John Ambulance Brigade.
- Captain Ernest Henry Marshall Wood, Chief Clerk, Office of the High Commissioner for the United Kingdom in New Zealand.
- Major John Marc Bishop Wratislaw, Honorary Secretary, Dorset County Garden Produce Committee.
- James Young, Chief Engineer Officer, ex. SS Matang, Singapore Straits Steamship Company.
- Katharine Jean Young, Senior Staff Officer, Ministry of Health.
- William Alexander Young, Assistant Area Road Haulage Officer, Glasgow, Ministry of Transport.
- Annie Louise Brown, Typist at His Majesty's Embassy at Bogota.
- Peter Paul Caruana, British Vice-Consul at Port Said.
- Canon Henry D'Albertanson, British Chaplain at Beaulieu and Monte Carlo.
- Paul Henry Alfred Ghislayn Howard Dorchy, formerly Information Officer at His Majesty's Consulate-General at Barcelona.
- Arthur Herbert Dudbridge, British subject resident in the Argentine Republic.
- Winifred Amy Edwards, British subject resident in Turkey.
- Leslie Desmond Edward Foster Vesey-Fitzgerald, Principal Assistant to the Chief Locust Officer, Middle East.
- George Pereira Fryxell, British Pro-Consul at Setubal.
- William Goodall, British subject resident in Persia.
- William Peter Halliday, formerly on the staff of the Political Adviser to the Commander in Chief, Germany.
- Arthur Halsey, Second Secretary (Commercial) at His Majesty's Embassy at Bagdad.
- Irene Hannaford, formerly on (the staff of the Supreme Allied Commander, South East Asia.
- John Roland Kay, British Vice-Consul at Chicago.
- Irma Klouzal, on the staff of the British Political Representative in Austria.
- James Stewart Lawson. For services to the British Colony in Riga.
- Harold Robert Moore, Deputy Assistant Legal Secretary, Sudan Government.
- John Alexander Reid, Principal Information Officer, Benghazi.
- May Rowdon, until recently Registrar at His Majesty's Legation at Reykjavik.
- Allan Veitch, Acting Consul-General at His Majesty's Consulate-General at Kunming.
- Cyril Whitworth, until recently Archivist at His Majesty's Legation at Addis Ababa.
- Myrtle Margaret Mary Winter, attached to a Department of the Foreign Office.
- Kathleen Nina Howard Witherow, Clerical Officer at His Majesty's Embassy at Rome.
- Elfreda Arkell, Senior Health Officer, Bulawayo Municipality, and Sister in Charge of the Princess Margaret Rose Clinic under (the auspices of the Bulawayo Child Welfare Society, Southern Rhodesia.
- Annie Bailey, of Thaba Bosiu, Basutoland. For social welfare services.
- Malcolm John Buckett, Traffic Controller, Southampton Docks, Southern Railway Company. For services to Dominion Ministers and other distinguished visitors from the Dominions, and in connection with the movement of oversea troops.
- Emma Mary Caulfield. For services in connection with philanthropic and patriotic organisations, State of Tasmania.
- Dorothy Cherry, a District Nurse in Newfoundland.
- Catherine Elizabeth Crompton. For services in connection with the Mothers' and Babies' Health Association, State of South Australia.
- Horace Joseph Dunn, Chairman, District Council of Saddleworth, State of South Australia, for many years.
- Frederick Leslie Finnie, Senior Clerk, Department of Internal Affairs, Southern Rhodesia.
- Mabel Forsey, formerly Post-mistress at Grand Bank, Newfoundland, for nearly 40 years.
- Florence Muriel Knight, formerly Matron, Adelaide Children's Hospital, State of South Australia.
- William Roland Dozell Lewis, of Bulawayo, Southern Rhodesia. For public and social welfare services.
- David McCrindle Macfarlane, formerly Inspector of Shipping and Lloyds Surveyor, Newfoundland.
- Hugh Munro Macleod Mackenzie, employed in the Audit Department, Southern Rhodesia.
- Jean Brownlee Mitchell, Director of George and Queen Elizabeth Officers' Club in Glasgow, under the auspices of the Empire Societies' War Hospitality Committee.
- Dorothy Alice Ogden, Secretary, Society for the Oversea Settlement of British Women.
- Doris Sophia Potter. Employed in Government House, Adelaide, State of South Australia.
- Marie Shepherd, Director of the Fitzroy Club in Glasgow, under the auspices of the Empire Societies' War Hospitality Committee.
- William George Sullivan, formerly President of the Longshoremen's Protective Union, Newfoundland.
- Thelma Florence Tyson, of Launceston, State of Tasmania. For social welfare services.
- Sheila Ailsa Van Niekerk, Nursing Sister, Swaziland Government Service.
- Evelyn Mary Yeoman. For services to George and Queen Elizabeth Officers' Club in Edinburgh, under the auspices of the Empire Societies' War Hospitality Committee.
- Kathleen Armer, Deputy Director, S.S.A.F.A. Welfare Directorate, General Headquarters, India.
- Jean Berrisford, Staff Officer, British Red Cross, S.E.A.C. Red Cross.
- Helen Margaret Saunders, Y.W.C.A. Welfare Officer-in-Charge, Camp, Anandagiri, Ootacamund.
- Eric Bridgnell, Under-Secretary to the Government of India in the Finance Department.
- Joseph Byrne. Director of American Surplus Stores in D.G. (Disposals).
- Frederick James Clarke, Station Superintendent and Honorary Assistant Transportation Officer (retired), North-Western Railway, Delhi.
- Major Geoffrey Clarke, Liaison Officer, Polish Orphans' Camp, Balachadi, Nawanagar State.
- Mario Claude Clerici, Indian Police, Assistant to the Inspector-General of Police, Orissa.
- Major Arthur Charles Corner, lately Attached Officer, Construction Branch (of the Posts and Telegraphs Directorate) in charge of the Trunk Exchange Design and Installation, Government of India.
- Charles Frederick Dickeson, Higher Education Officer, Office of the Auditor of Indian Home Accounts, London.
- John Donald, Jute Merchant and Honorary Secretary, Dacca Club Gymkhana Races, Bengal.
- Robert Ernest Embleton, Technical Assistant, Photographic, Indian Air Survey and Transport, Limited, Dum Dum.
- Reginald Norman Fox, Wireless Officer, British Mission, Lhasa, Tibet.
- George Colville Frankum, Officiating Works Manager, His Majesty's Mint, Calcutta.
- Sardar Ramchandrarao Jayasinharao Ghorpade, Lieutenant-Colonel in the Dewas States Forces, Jagirdar of Laxmipura and Akalia, Dewas State (Senior Branch).
- Rollo Henri Gross, lately (British) Specialist Instructor, Government of India, Technical Training Centre, Trivandrum.
- Major Marcel Gaston Hooper, Assistant Commandant, Special Armed Constabulary, Central Province and Berar.
- Robert Douglas Howe, Indian Civil Service, Under-Secretary to the Government of India in the Defence Department.
- Herbert William Hunt, Assistant Superintendent, Printing and Stationery, North-Western Railway, and Honorary Secretary, Revnell Services Club, Lahore, Punjab.
- Walter Geoffrey Lamarque, Indian Civil Service, Deputy Secretary to the Government of India in the Department of Industries and Supplies.
- Roger Edward Rowley Lees, Indian Police, Officiating Superintendent of Police, Purnea, Bihar.
- Captain Edward Walter Moyle Magor, Indian Army, Indian Political Service, lately Secretary to the Resident for Kolhapur and the Deccan States.
- Ronald Harry Mitchell, Assistant Conservator of Forests, Madras.
- Peter Moore, Assistant Transportation Superintendent, Traffic, Madras and Southern Mahratta Railway, Rayapuram.
- William Nagle, Registrar, Central Police Office, Punjab.
- Douglas George Littlejohn Pirie, Manager of the Shipping Department of Parry and Company, Limited, Madras.
- John Pratt, Chief Inspector of Steam Boiler and Smoke Nuisances, Bombay.
- Alexander Robertson, Tea Planter, Siliguri, Darjeeling, Bengal.
- Frederick Samuel Seller, Regional Radio Controller, Civil Aviation Department, Government of India, and lately Assistant Engineer, Wireless.
- Henry William Tristram, Superintendent, Messrs. Gladstone, Wyllie and Company, Wyndhamgunj, Mirzapur, United Provinces.
- The Reverend George Appleton, Director of Public Relations, Burma.
- Samuel Devaprasadham David, Assistant Secretary to the Government of Burma, Finance and Revenue Department.
- Reginald Hugh Whittam, Income-tax Officer, Grade I, Personal Assistant to the Commissioner of Income Tax, Burma.
- Isaac Boateng Asafu Adjaye, MRCS, LRCP. For political and social services in the Gold Coast.
- Elizabeth Fletcher Armitage. For services in connection with the Jewish Camp in Mauritius.
- Dorcas Mabel Aubrey. For welfare services in Kenya.
- Ayub Ali, Assistant Establishment Officer (Asian), Secretariat, Kenya.
- May Baissac. For services during the war to the Red Cross in Mauritius.
- Harold Barrett, Colonial Prison Service. Lately in charge of Stanley Prison, Hong Kong.
- Adelaide Palmer Benjamin, Senior Staff Nurse. For services during the enemy occupation of Singapore.
- Margaret Bennetts, Colonial Nursing Service, Senior Nursing Sister, Nigeria.
- Ella Botes. For welfare services in Northern Rhodesia.
- Sylvester Modupe Broderick, Colonial Education Service, African Assistant Director of Education, Sierra Leone.
- Antoinette Butcher, Sister of Charity, Matron, Central Hospital, Malta.
- Solomon Cox, Primary School Teacher, Windward Islands.
- Alice Mary Davies, Colonial Nursing Service, Principal Matron, Government Medical Department, Hong Kong.
- Joyce Louise Donald. For services as Secretary of the Evacuee Committee, Ceylon.
- Robert Arthur Dummett. For services as Controller of Supplies and Prices, British Guiana.
- John Colley Faye, Alkali of Kristi Kunda, and Headmaster of the House of Transfiguration School, Kristi Kunda, Gambia.
- Alexander Smaill Frater, MB, BS, DTM. For medical and public services in the New Hebrides.
- George Gellanders, MRSanI, Chief Health Inspector, Uganda.
- Winifred Hobson, for services during the war to the Red Cross in Trinidad.
- Iman Mohamed, 1st Grade Clerk, British Somaliland Military Administration.
- Cecil Vemon Jumeaux, LMS, Government Medical Service. For services during the enemy occupation of Malaya.
- Alexander Clarke Macdonald, Engineer in charge of the distribution branch of the Municipal Water Department, Singapore. For services during hostilities.
- Teresa Mary Middlebrook, Headmistress of Flores College, Valletta. For services to Education in Malta.
- John James Mills, Vice Principal, Mico Training College, Jamaica.
- Theophilus Amin Halil Mogabgab, Antiquities Officer and Curator, Famagusta Museum, Cyprus.
- Nuer Ologo V, Paramount Chief of Yilo Krobo, Gold Coast.
- Willorage Hector Douglas Perera, Chief Assistant Port Controller, Ceylon.
- Frederick Reed, Staff Officer, Crown Agents for the Colonies.
- Ferdinand Louis Ruggeri, City Engineer, Surveyor and Valuator, Gibraltar.
- Michael Arbuthnot Sharpe, Colonial Administrative Service, Administrative Officer, Nyasaland.
- Sinnappah Sinnadurai, Assistant Secretary in the Secretariat of the Malayan Union.
- Mary Hamilton South. For services at the Junior European School and as Supervisor, Correspondence Course, Tanganyika.
- Tama Weng Ajang, Kayan Chief, Penghulu of Long Akah, Sarawak.
- Sotirios Christou Terezopoulos, for welfare services to the Cypriot community in the United Kingdom.
- Frederick Taylor Thompson, Goods Agent, Kenya and Uganda Railways and Harbours.
- Arthur Herbert Stanley Vigo, Agricultural Officer, Nigeria.
- Hugh Wands, MB, ChB, Medical Officer, Sandakan, North Borneo. For services during internment.
- Sydney Goddord White, Colonial Audit Service, Assistant Auditor, Palestine.
- Lawrence Wileman, Assistant Works Manager, Public Works Department, Nigeria.

Honorary Members

- James Obiekwe Ononye, Chief Clerk, Provincial Administration, Nigeria.
- Edward Akakpo Mensah, Assistant Superintendent of Police, Nigeria.
- Che Yeop Mahidin bin Mohamed Shariff, Malayan Administrative Service.
- Captain Mohamed Salleh bin Haji Sulaiman, Malayan Civil Service.
- Ong Seong Tek. For welfare and Civil Defence services in Malaya.
- Che Mohamed Pilus bin Kassim, General Clerical Service, Malayan Union. For services during the Japanese occupation.
- Khang Ah Chong. For services during the Japanese occupation of Sarawak.
- Sheikh Suleiman Kheir, Chairman of Village Committee at Abu Sinan, Palestine.
- Benyamin Fishman, Senior Inspector of Land Registries, Palestine.
- Haj Taj Ed Din Sha'th, lately Mayor of Beersheba, Palestine.
- Jerome Peter Pereira, 1st Grade Clerk, Post Office, Aden.

=== Kaisar-i-Hind Medal ===
- Kathleen, Lady Wylie (wife of His Excellency Sir Francis Wylie, KCSI, CIE, Governor of the United Provinces).
- Her Highness Nawab Rafat Zamani Begum of Rampur.
- Rachel, Lady Ezra, District Commissioner, Girls' Guide Association, Calcutta, Bengal.
- Ethel Aberdein Gordon, Principal, Church of Scotland Mission Training College, for Women, Poona, Bombay.
- Margaret Gillespie McMillan, in charge Women's Mission Hospital, Ajmer.
- Sir Clutha Nantes Mackenzie, St. Dunstan's Representative in India.
- William Robert Tennant, CIE, Indian Civil Service, Honorary Treasurer, Indian Red Cross and St. John War Organisation.

=== British Empire Medals (BEM) ===
Military Division

Royal Navy

- Sick Berth Chief Petty Officer Jack Banting, P/M.36192.
- Chief Wren Writer Jane Mackenzie Barr, 17659, Women's Royal Naval Service.
- Sergeant (Temporary) Alfred Henry Boatch, Ply.X.120164, Royal Marines.
- Acting Chief Air Artificer William Alfred Booth, FX.75076.
- Chief Petty Officer David Butcher, P/J.19929.
- Chief Petty Officer Harry James Chatterton, C/J.113744.
- Chief Petty Officer Writer (Temporary) Norman Avery Cornhill, C/MX.59842.
- Air Artificer 3rd Class Ernest Robert Cornwell, FX.645988.
- Able Seaman John Joseph Coulson, P/JX. 520337.
- Sergeant Temporary (Acting Temporary Colour Sergeant) Grosvenor Edwin Dormer, PO/X.814, Royal Marines.
- Petty Officer Wren Writer Edna May Driscoll, 5092, Women's Royal Naval Service.
- Chief Shipwright Richard Charles Ford, P.345741.
- Chief Stoker John George Griffiths, C/K.65611.
- Chief Petty Officer (Temporary) Edward Joseph Harris, P/J.108343.
- Staff Clerk Wilfred Hunter, Ch.X.831, Royal Marines.
- Petty Officer Telegraphist William James Jackson, D/JX 293763.
- Stores Chief Petty Officer Francis Thomas Joseph Johns, P/MX.46854.
- Chief Petty Officer William Patrick Joyce, P/JX.112422.
- Chief Petty Officer (Boatswain) Harold Matchett, RTP/R.238853.
- Chief Petty Officer Cook (S) (Temporary) Royston Henry Peckham, P/MX.49843.
- Leading Sick Berth Attendant William John Randies, P/MX.51055.
- Chief Petty Officer (Temporary) Joseph Walter Rutland, P/JX.120547.
- Chief Engineroom Artificer 1st Class William Charles Sadlier. C/M.9935.
- Able Seaman Douglas George Steptoe, P/JX. 295162.
- Chief Wren Steward Kathleen Thompson, 1059 Women's Royal Naval Service.
- Chief Engineroom Artificer William George Wright, C/MX.48335.

In recognition of Operational Minesweeping service since the end of the War.

- Steward Stanley Watt Anderson, C/LX.579222.
- Chief Engineman Ronald Francis Stewart Davidson, LT/KX.115121.
- Able Seaman Trefor Thomas Farmiloe, P/JX.625773.
- Petty Officer Telegraphist William Thomas Stanley Hall, C/JX.150214.
- Leading Seaman Charles Higgins, LT/JX.218243.
- Leading Signalman: Henry George Arthur Hine, C/SSX.31467.
- Wireman (L) Gordon Rouse McDonald, P/MX.634368.
- Engineroom Artificer 3rd Class Patrick Aloysius Owens, C/MX.103332.
- Leading Seaman James Robert Plant, LT/JX.177107.
- Stoker Petty Officer Leslie Albert Read, C/K.87293.
- Leading Stoker Frank Arthur Robinson, LT/KX.148573.
- Chief Yeoman of Signals James William Small, D/JX.132902.
- Petty Officer Ralph Atkinson Taylor, DSM, C/JX.128047.
- Seaman John Carrick Turner, LT/JX.559685.

Army

- No. 26846 Company Sergeant-Major Bida Audu, The Nigeria Regiment.
- No. 4040899 Staff-Sergeant (Acting) George Austin, Royal Armoured Corps.
- No. 475284 Sergeant Jack Herbert Bevett, Indian Army Corps of Clerks.
- No. 5831648 Sergeant Reginald Albert Brett, Royal Electrical and Mechanical Engineers.
- No. L/NCA/17033 Sergeant Charles Alexander Buckley, British Honduras Battalion.
- No. W/299491 Sergeant Doreen Lilian Burdett, Auxiliary Territorial Service.
- No. 2648652 Sergeant Richard Callow, Coldstream Guards.
- No. W/244783 Corporal Margaret Winifred Chambers, Auxiliary Territorial Service.
- No. 6351914 Sergeant Geoffrey Wilfred Clifford, Royal Army Service Corps (attached Indian Army Corps of Clerks).
- No. 2581181 Sergeant (Acting) John Emerson Cowen, Royal Coups of Signals.
- No. 2614655 Sergeant Sidney Charles Dowland, Grenadier Guards.
- No. S/14727767 Sergeant (Acting) Frederick William Ellis, Royal Army Service Corps.
- No. 51115 Company Quartermaster-Sergeant Edmund Engerer, King's Own Malta Regiment.
- No. W/7257096 Private Norah Catherine Enston, Auxiliary Territorial Service.
- No. 3309760 Sergeant Hugh Feeney, The Queen's Royal Regiment (West Surrey).
- No. 13033455 Warrant Officer Class II (Acting) Leonard William Foakes, Royal Pioneer Corps.
- No. W/4688 Sergeant Lavinia Fry, Women's Auxiliary Corps (India).
- No. 5047989 Squadron Quartermaster-Sergeant Harry John Goodhead, The Staffordshire Yeomanry, Royal Armoured Corps.
- No. 5/14413500 Staff-Sergeant Henry Herbert Goodrham, Royal Army Service Corps.
- No. W/111755 Sergeant Joyce Mary Gould, Auxiliary Territorial Service.
- No. 5/10662072 Staff-Sergeant (Acting) David Grainger, Royal Army Service Corps.
- No. 1475412 Staff-Sergeant (A.C.) Henry Neville Greenhow, Royal Regiment of Artillery.
- No. 5/135191 Warrant Officer Class II (Acting) Donald Hall, Royal Army Service Corps.
- No. 14639444 Sergeant Aubrey Hannam, Royal Army Medical Corps.
- No. 2391284 Corporal Hubert Aloysius Healy, Corps of Royal Engineers.
- No. 2328342 Lance-Sergeant Alexander Charles Honeyands, Royal Corps of Signals.
- No. S/7405492 Corporal Alfred Thomas King, Royal Army Service Corps.
- No. 14234813 Bombardier Alfred Herbert Lee, Royal Regiment of Artillery.
- No. 999125 Sergeant Owen Charles Little, Corps of Royal Military Police.
- No. 7631781 Staff-Sergeant Alexander Macdougall, Royal Army Ordnance Corps.
- No. 5/235959 Warrant Officer Class II (Acting) Ralph George Martin, Royal Army Service Corps.
- No. 7536214 Staff-Sergeant Henry Edward William McGill, Royal Army Dental Corps.
- No. W/12999 Warrant Officer Class I (Acting) Anne Miller Meikle, Auxiliary Territorial Service.
- No. 3132267 Sergeant William Melee, The Royal Scots Fusiliers.
- No. ZBK/11689 Warrant Officer Class I Jacob Mwakanema, King's African Rifles.
- No. 5720V Warrant Officer Class II (temporary) Joseph Johannes Novella, Union Defence Force.
- No. 7389257 Sergeant (Acting) William Dennis Parker, Royal Army Medical Corps.
- No. 14217885 Staff-Sergeant James Reginald Pickles, Corps of Royal Engineers.
- No. W/198278 Staff-Sergeant Iris Lily Potter, Auxiliary Territorial Service.
- No. 5388390 Sergeant John Pringle, Corps of Royal Military Police.
- No. W/536093 Sergeant May Ethel Richards, Voluntary Aid Detachment.
- No. 14305891 Staff-Sergeant Philip Charles Singleton, Corps of Royal Engineers.
- No. W/6116 Staff-Sergeant (acting Warrant Officer) Nance Barbara Smith, Women's Auxiliary Corps (India).
- No. 5626066 Staff-Sergeant Mervyn John Spicer, Royal Pioneer Corps.
- No. W/164045 Sergeant Brenda Elsie Minnie Swann, Auxiliary Territorial Service.
- No. S/243916 Staff-Sergeant George William Dowling Terrell, Royal Army Service Corps.
- No. 6390946 Warrant Officer Class II (Acting) Reginald Cyril Vines, Corps of Royal Engineers.
- No. W/249264 Corporal Emily Walker, Auxiliary Territorial Service.
- No. 915384 Staff-Sergeant William Peter Watson, Corps of Royal Engineers.
- No. W/69883 Lance-Sergeant Jessie Kemp Watt, Auxiliary Territorial Service.
- No. 14397192 Sergeant Cecil Herbert Weekes, Royal Army Ordnance Corps.
- No. W/169815 Staff-Sergeant Ivy Weston, Auxiliary Territorial Service.
- No. 828741 Staff-Sergeant Cecil Woods, Royal Regiment of Artillery.
- No. NA/232036 Mallam Zakare, The Nigeria Regiment.
- Sergeant Ali Nour Sharaf, Trans Jordanian Frontier Force.

Royal Air Force

- 534054 Flight Sergeant George Henry Adams.
- 1142155 Flight Sergeant Stanley Ashley, Royal Air Force Volunteer Reserve.
- 801271 Flight Sergeant Cuthbert Thomas Bulman, Auxiliary Air Force.
- 560569 Flight Sergeant Albert Robert Benjamin Cousins.
- 947133 Flight Sergeant Alexander Smart, Royal Air Force Volunteer Reserve.
- 956813 Flight Sergeant Leonard Albert Smith, Royal Air Force Volunteer Reserve.
- 560906 Flight Sergeant Cyril Eric Stearn.
- 1716196 Flight Sergeant Leonard Wolstenholme, Royal Air Force Volunteer Reserve.
- 1325533 Signaller I. Frank Carnson Mayoh, Royal Air Force Volunteer Reserve.
- 809214 Acting Flight Sergeant John Jackson, Auxiliary Air Force.
- 566536 Acting Flight Sergeant William Eddon Sword.
- 533535 Sergeant Thomas Herbert Kneen.
- 986149 Sergeant Arthur Thomas Pitt, Royal Air Force Volunteer Reserve.
- 1630741 Acting Sergeant Thomas Leslie Dyer.
- 653494 Acting Sergeant Alexander Ritchie Paton.
- 1683452 Corporal Charles Frederick Bennett, Royal Air Force Volunteer Reserve.
- 1094039 Leading Aircraftman Kenneth Rhead, Royal Air Force Volunteer Reserve.
- 887171 Flight Sergeant Catherine Mary Rumsey, Women's Auxiliary Air Force.
- 2056835 Sergeant Margaret Elizabeth Spowart, Women's Auxiliary Air Force.
- 2090835 Corporal Joan Gamwell, Women's Auxiliary Air Force.
- 483250 Acting Corporal Kathleen Rosina Huggins, Women's Auxiliary Air Force.

Civil Division

United Kingdom

- James Allen, Stone Mine Driver, Alloa Coal Company Ltd, Tillicoultry.
- Albert Edward Andrews, Foreman, Ransomes, Sims & Jefferies Ltd, Ipswich.
- Frederick George Andrews, Established Yard Craftsman, Royal William Yard, Plymouth.
- Edward Armstrong, Head Foreman Electrician, Vickers-Armstrongs Ltd, Newcastle upon Tyne.
- Reuben Wilfred Ashborn, Temporary Leading Draughtsman, Geological Survey and Museum, Department of Scientific and Industrial Research.
- Alfred Ernest Atkinson, Foreman Pattern-maker, Ashmore, Benson, Pease & Company Ltd, Stockton-on-Tees.
- Randolph Atkinson, Checkweighman, Barrow Colliery.
- John Baillie, Head Papermaker, Henry Bruce & Sons Ltd, Currie.
- William Barnes, Foreman, National Fertilisers Ltd, Avonmouth.
- James Grant Barron, lately Chief Officer (Class II), HM Prison, Perth.
- Daniel Bebbington, Chemical Labourer, Imperial Chemical Industries Ltd, Manchester.
- Walter Beveridge, Maintenance Handy Labourer, Granton Docks.
- Thomas Blakemore, Collier, Methley Silkstone Colliery.
- Henry Peter Bull Boatman, DCM, Office Keeper, HM Treasury.
- John Swam Bradshaw, Chief Tester, Admiralty Section Test Room, Evershed & Vignoles, Ltd, Chiswick.
- Thomas Brady. For Public services in Cardiff.
- James Buckley, Shop Fitter-Mechanic, Bristol Tramways Company.
- Mary Burrows, Centre Organiser, Sevenoaks Rural District, Women's Voluntary Services.
- Mabel Butler, Member, Women's Land Army, Enborne, Newbury.
- Albert Charles Cash, Senior Purifierman, S. Healing & Sons Ltd, Tewkesbury.
- Joseph Charles, Craneman, Belfast Harbour Commissioners.
- William Arthur Clayton, Registered Dock Worker, Liverpool.
- William Bettison Clayton, Supervisor and Manager of Wharfinging, Horsley, Smith & Company Ltd, Hull.
- William Henry Cooper, Yard Boatswain, John I. Thornycroft & Company Ltd, London.
- Thomas Cowan, Coal Filler, Ashington Coal Company.
- Arthur William Darbyshire, Bread Baker, London Co-operative Society Ltd.
- Dorothy Mary Elizabeth Davis, Supervisor, Queen Street Post Office, Cardiff.
- Lily Dixon, Matron, North Sea Camp Borstal Institution.
- Marjorie Elizabeth Dixon, Member, British Red Cross Society, London.
- Florence Maude Doran, Supervisor (Telegraphs), Head Post Office, Wolverhampton.
- William Doyle, Leading Storeman, No. 3 Maintenance Unit, Royal Air Force, Milton.
- Ernest Edward Drake, Foreman, Royal Mint.
- Thomas Eccleston, Foreman, Manchester Ship Canal Company.
- Albert Edwards, Skilled Workman, Class I, Post Office Telephone Exchange, Greenwich.
- Henry George Martin Elliott, First Mould Setter, Thos. Firth & John Brown Ltd, Sheffield.
- Percy Stanhope Folkard, Chief Bookseller, HM Stationery Office.
- George Foster, Maintenance Millwright, Percival Aircraft Ltd, Luton.
- William Walter Foster, Principal Foreman of Stores, No. 28 Maintenance Unit, Royal Air Force, Buxton.
- Robert Emanuel Vincent Lawrence Gatt, Local Chart Supply Officer, HM Dockyard, Malta.
- William Goldup, Permanent Way Supervisor, Southern Railway Company.
- George Gorton, Collier, Hargreaves Colliery Ltd.
- Reuben Gorton, Shop Superintendent, Mather & Platt Ltd, Manchester.
- Georgina Mary Gray, Member, Women's Land Army, Harrpwdene, Felmersham.
- Samuel Grebby, Twisthand, E. Fyson & Son, Ltd, Long Eaton.
- Lester Eley Gregory, Assistant Superintendent, Ordnance Survey Office, Chessington.
- Charles Vernon Henry Hardy, Foreman Warper, A. W. Black, Ltd, Beeston.
- William Ernest Harman, Assistant Foreman, Royal Aircraft Establishment, South Farnborough.
- Elizabeth May Harper, Supervisor, Post Office Telephone Exchange, Exeter.
- Arthur Donald Radford Hayden, Station Warden, Royal Air Force Station, Boscombe Down.
- Albert Hellier, Foreman, Cowbridge Depot, Glamorgan War Agricultural Executive Committee.
- Albert William Hodges, Factory Foreman, J. Long & Sons Ltd, Bath.
- Betty Holmes, Member, Women's Land Army, Hutton, Preston.
- Joseph Hoy, Stoneman, Wearmouth Colliery.
- Robert Hutchison, Boiler Shop Heavy Plater, Fairfield Shipbuilding and Engineering Company Ltd, Glasgow.
- Williamina Jack, Canteen Manageress, Navy, Army, & Air Force Institutes.
- Henry Jacobs, Ambulance Driver, British Red Cross Society.
- Elizabeth Jarvis, Centre Organiser, Penge, Women's Voluntary Services.
- George Oliver Jenkins, Foreman of Works, Staff of Superintending Civil Engineer, Admiralty, Colombo.
- Ellen Jane Jones, Weaver, Winterbottom Book Cloth Company, Dukinfield.
- Elsie Mary Jones, Nailing Machinist, Fair, Smith and Company, Ltd.
- William Jones, JP, Crane Operator, Dorman Long & Company, Ltd, Middlesbrough.
- William Ernest Judd, Mechanic Examiner, Inspectorate of Electrical & Mechanical Equipment, Ministry of Supply.
- George Morton Justice, Housemaster, Duke of York's Royal Military School, Dover.
- Ronald Venvell Keates, Company Officer, No. 15 (Reading) Fire Force, National Fire Service.
- George Albert Laister, Checkweighman, Rockingham Colliery.
- William Lamond, Company Officer, National Fire Service, Eastern Area of Scotland.
- Andrew Lawson, Driller, Swan Hunter & Wigham Richardson, Ltd, Newcastle upon Tyne.
- William Clyde Leggatt, Station Master, (Thurso), London, Midland & Scottish Railway Company.
- George Leitchman, Foreman, James Scott & Sons Ltd, Dundee.
- George Letty, Acting Senior Foreman of Storehouses, Royal Navy Store Depot, Park Royal.
- John Macgregor, Hospital Orderly, Hairmyres Hospital, Lanarkshire.
- Isabel Craib Mackenzie, Member, Scottish Women's Land Army, Torgorm Farm, Conon Bridge, Ross-shire.
- Wilhelmina S. Maitland, Member, Headquarters Staff, Women's Voluntary Services in Scotland.
- Archie Marks, Carriage Examiner, (Crewe Station), London, Midland & Scottish Railway Company.
- John May, Butler, British Legation to the Holy See, Rome.
- George Laing Mitchell, Flax Dresser, Richards Ltd, Aberdeen.
- John Arthur Moody, Coxswain, Humber Conservancy Board.
- Ernest Francis Moore, Radial Driller, de Havilland Engine Company Ltd, Edgware.
- Richard Morris, Collier, Oak Victoria Colliery, Oldham.
- Victor Henry Moseley, Acting Chief Inspector, War Department Constabulary.
- Alice May Mulcare, Factory Forewoman, General Post Office.
- George Newbould, Coal Face Chargeman, Old Thorncliffe Colliery.
- Seth Oakton, Colliery Checkweighman, Shirebrook Colliery Ltd, Mansfield.
- Roland Oldroyd, Chief Inspector, Blackburn Aircraft Ltd, Dumbarton.
- Constance Ellen Page, Chief Supervisor of Sorting Assistants, General Post Office, Morecambe.
- Richard Pearce, Collier, Garw Colliery, Blaengarw, Glamorgan.
- Albert Edgar Piper, Travelling Superintendent Gardener, Imperial War Graves Commission, Belgium.
- Walter Martin Reed, District Permanent Way Inspector, (Stratford), London and North Eastern Railway Company.
- Thomas Regan, Skilled Workman, Class I, Telephone Manager's Office, Bristol.
- Michael Reilly, Leading Skilled Labourer, HM Dockyard, Chatham.
- Charles Richardson, Precision Machinist, English Electric Company Ltd, Preston.
- George Ridgley, Sub-Postmaster, Speen, Aylesbury.
- Peter Roberts, Collier, Point of Ayr Collieries Ltd.
- Thomas Ellis Rodley, Foreman of Works (Building), Ministry of Works.
- Nora Rowland, Member, Women's Land Army, Knapton.
- Alice Russell, Cook, Nurses Home, Battle Hospital, Reading.
- John Wood Scott, Dredging Foreman, Lee Conservancy Board.
- Ernest James Scroggs, MM, Officer Keeper, Exchequer and Audit Department.
- George David Seal, Charge Hand, Standard Telephones & Cables Ltd, London.
- Arthur Selby, Twisthand, A. & F. H. Parkes (Nottingham) Ltd, Beeston.
- John Thomas Simpson, Stoker's Assistant, Carville Power Station, North Eastern Electric Supply Company Ltd.
- George Skedge, JP, Underground Worker, Maude Pit, Backworth.
- William Charles Spillman, Inspector, Head Post Office, Doncaster.
- Amy Lavinia Stokes, Domestic Assistant, Harefield County Hospital.
- Herbert Thistlethwaite, Draughtsman, Class I, Telephone Manager's Office, Birmmgham.
- John Thomson, Wdrks Foreman, B. Whittaker & Sons, Leeds.
- Walter James Todd, General Foreman, Dover Industries Ltd, Dover.
- Arthur Thomas Tyack, Chargeman of Plumbers, HM Dockyard, Sheerness.
- Harold Waite, Foreman, Royal Ordnance Factory, Glascoed.
- Frederick George Wareham, Principal Foreman of Stores, No. 19 Maintenance Unit, Royal Air Force, Barry.
- Wilfred James Weaver, Toolroom Manager, Elkington & Company Ltd.
- Harry Webb, Assistant Foreman Carpenter, Caledon Shipbuilding & Engineering Company Ltd, Dundee.
- Thomas Arthur Wells, lately 1st Class Draughtsman, Senior Assistant to Admiralty Engineer Overseer, Scotland District.
- Frank Whatmough, Gearbox Production Superintendent, David Brown Tractors Ltd.
- Herbert Alan Wilkins, Artificer, Admiralty Signal Establishment.
- George Willcox, Shipwright, Swan Hunter & Wigham Richardson, Ltd, Newcastle upon Tyne.
- David Williams, Postman, Pontyclun, Glamorgan.
- Joseph Samuel Wtilson, River Inspector, Aire & Calder Navigation Company.
- George Wright, Traffic Foreman, River Weir Commissioners.
- Mary C. Yule, Matron, Plas Darland Hostel for Blind Evacuees, Wrexham, Women's Voluntary Services.

India

- Flora Agnes Balding, Assistant, Central Cypher Bureau, External Affairs Department, Government of India.
- John Bickers, Station Master, Bombay, Baroda and Central India Railway, Ajmer.
- Maurice Moreau Blake, Tour Superintendent, Office of the Military Secretary to His Excellency the Viceroy.
- Phyllis Ethel Homer, Assistant, Central Cypher Bureau, External Affairs Department, Government of India.
- Arthur William Wilfred Johnston, Storeholder, Rifle Factory, Ishapore.
- Louis William Robert Lappin (No. 5629580, Sergeant, Royal Corps of Signals), Director of Intelligence Bureau, India.
- Alfred William Notley, Station Superintendent, Victoria Terminus, Great Indian Peninsula Railway, Bombay.
- Phyllis Eleanore Reeve, Superintendent, Quartermaster-General's Branch, General Headquarters, India.
- Tom William Wynne Rowe, Principal Foreman, Harness and Saddlery Factory, Cawnpore.
- Clarence Augustus Shilling, Guard, North-Western Railway, Delhi Division.
- Thakur Madho Singh, Head Clerk, Malwa Bhil Corps, Indore.

Colonial Empire

- Fong Hing, Coxswain, Water Police Force, Hong Kong.
- Mzee Abdullah, 1st Sergeant, Customs Department, Kenya.
- Lawrence Da Cruz, Special Grade Clerk, Treasury, Kenya.
- Alla Ditta Amir Ahmed, Senior Yard Foreman, Kenya and Uganda Railways and Harbours, Mombasa, Kenya.
- Battistina Camilleri, Nursing Sister, Malta.
- Joseph Petroni, 1st Class Postal Clerk, Malta.
- Oreste Saccasan, Sorter, General Post Office, Malta.
- Kate Sant, Auxiliary Nurse, St. John's Ambulance Brigade, Malta.
- William Tagliaferro, Assistant to the Foreman of Carpentry, Public Works Department, Malta.
- Andrew Tonna, Male Nurse, Malta.
- Edward Richardson, Locomotive Inspector, Nigeria.
- Abdullah Amer Nimmer Amli, Mukhtar of Beit Alua Village, Hebron Sub-District, Palestine.
- Tova Brailofsky, Clerk (Typist), Grade O, Public Works Department, Palestine.
- Mohamed Khalil Darkali, MC, Inspector, Prisons Service, Palestine.
- Richard Yon, Fisherman, St. Helena.
- Penghulu Belaja of Poi Kanowit, in Sarawak.
- Penghulu Bilong of Pala Wong, Kapit, Headman, Sarawak.
- Baleng Amak Oyong Abun, Headman, Sarawak.
- Dominic Sedik of Kuala Baram. For services as Wireless Operator, Sarawak.
- Limbang Bin Lai. For services as Wireless Operator, Sarawak.
- Lassoh of Belaga, Sarawak.
- Lanyieng of Punan Tepilang, Belaga, Sarawak, Penghulu Ngali, Sarawak.
- Penghulu Oyong Puso, a Skapan Chief of Belaga, Sarawak.
- Saba Tuai Rumah of Nanga Pila, Sarawak.
- Penghulu Sandai, Headman, Sarawak.
- Iris Larose, for services in connection with Home Industries in Seychelles.
- Abu Bakar Bin Abdullah, Warden, Air Raid Precautions Service, Singapore.
- Peter Ferguson, Foreman, Auxiliary Fire Service, Singapore.
- Low A. Kow, Group Warden, Air Raid Precaution Service, Singapore.
- Lee Tuck Chan, Foreman, Auxiliary Fire Service, Singapore.
- Ling Wing Kee, Warden, Air Raid Precaution Service, Singapore.
- Mohamed Sho Hid Bin Saleh, Warden, Air Raid Precaution Service, Singapore.
- Pallipshottachu Mathew Chacko, Section Inspector, Municipal Water Department, Singapore.
- Ernest Patrick Fairly Scully, Post Warden, Air Raid Precaution Service, Singapore.
- Wee Teow Poh, Group Warden, Air Raid Precaution Service, Singapore.

=== Royal Red Crosses (RRC) ===
- Principal Matron (temporary) Ileene Maude Minas (NZ 4471), Indian Military Nursing Service.
- Matron (Acting) Evelyn Mary Mollet (206302), Queen Alexandra's Imperial Military Nursing Service.
- Principal Matron (Acting) Florence Margaret Ridley (NZ 21758), Army Nursing Service (India) (Reserve).
- Matron (Acting) Florence Elizabeth Robinson (215271), Territorial Army Nursing Service.
- Matron Alice Mabel Rodd, ARRC (5039), Princess Mary's Royal Air Force Nursing Service.

==== Associates of the Royal Red Cross (ARRC) ====
- Sybilla Katherine Estella Richard, Acting Senior Sister, Queen Alexandra's Royal Naval Nursing Service.
- Gdraldine Maud Arthur, Nursing Sister, Queen Alexandra's Royal Naval Nursing Service.
- Mabel Middleton, Head V.A.D. Nursing Member.
- Mary Agnes Taylor, Head V.A.D. Nursing Member.
- Sister Thelma Bows (209457), Queen Alexandra's Imperial Military Nursing Service (Reserve).
- Matron (Acting) Bessie Maud Clark (26095), Indian Military Nursing Service.
- Liaison Officer Gertrude Jane Simpson Corsar (W/5O2007), Voluntary Aid Detachment.
- Principal Matron (Acting) Anne Davis (NZ 12994), Indian Military Nursing Service.
- Senior Sister (Acting) Winifred Margaret Foulds (208219), Queen Alexandra's Imperial Military Nursing Service (Reserve).
- Sister Eleanora Heritage (208353), Queen Alexandra's Imperial Military Nursing Service (Reserve).
- Sister Murdina Smith (221932), Territorial Army Nursing Service.
- Sister Rose Bella Spencer (305066), Queen Alexandra's Imperial Military Nursing Service (Reserve).
- Sister Lilian Frances Thompson (257436), Queen Alexandra's Imperial Military Nursing Service (Reserve).
- Matron Eileen May Tobin, Indian Military Nursing Service.
- Acting Matron Alice Lowrey (5062), Princess Mary's Royal Air Force Nursing Service.
- Acting Senior Sister Edith Mary Church (5455), Princess Mary's Royal Air Force Nursing Service (Reserve).
- Acting Senior Sister Mary Jopp (5068), Princess Mary's Royal Air Force Nursing Service.

=== Air Force Crosses (AFC) ===
Royal Air Force

- Air Commodore Alfred Charles Henry Sharp, DSO.
- Group Captain John Alexander McDonald, CBE.
- Wing Commander Ernest Edward Michael Angell (37743).
- Wing Commander Martin Patrick Courtenay Corkery (37038).
- Wing Commander Michael Henry de Lisle Everest (34192), Reserve of Air Force Officers
- Wing Commander William Hubert Ingle (33259).
- Acting Wing Commander Peter March Dobrée Bell (42676).
- Acting Wing Commander Sidney Weetman Rochford Hughes, OBE (40784).
- Squadron Leader Kenneth Bell (70843), Reserve of Air Force Officers
- Squadron Leader Harry Hamilton Scott Brown, MB, BS (23355).
- Squadron Leader Allan John Laird Craig, DSO, DFC (103561).
- Acting Squadron Leader Reginald John Foster, DFC (106065), Royal Air Force Volunteer Reserve.
- Acting Squadron Leader Eric Arthur Johnson, DFC (147215), Royal Air Force Volunteer Reserve.
- Acting Squadron Leader Nigel Martin Maynard, DFC (44196).
- Acting Squadron Leader James Rush (74726), Royal Air Force Volunteer Reserve.
- Acting Squadron Leader Kenneth James Sewell, DFM (45358).
- Acting Squadron Leader Edwin Joseph Spencer (43931).
- Flight Lieutenant Charles Thomas Boxall (44599).
- Flight Lieutenant Ronald William Bunyan (133789), Royal Air Force Volunteer Reserve.
- Flight Lieutenant Kenneth Philip Hubert Cleife (111970), Royal Air Force Volunteer Reserve.
- Flight Lieutenant Jacques Antonin Maurice Cocheme (139662), Royal Air Force Volunteer Reserve.
- Flight Lieutenant Andrew Leslie Cole (153770), Royal Air Force Volunteer Reserve.
- Flight Lieutenant Robert Lawson Duncan (138293).
- Flight Lieutenant John Stewart Fifield, DFC (83274), Royal Air Force Volunteer Reserve.
- Flight Lieutenant George Colin Lamb (136413), Royal Air Force Volunteer Reserve.
- Flight Lieutenant William Neil MacGillivray (120562), Royal Air Force Volunteer Reserve.
- Flight Lieutenant Alfred Charles Leonard Munns, A.F.M. (46771).
- Flight Lieutenant Howard Thomas Murley, DFC (176032), Royal Air Force Volunteer Reserve.
- Flight Lieutenant Cyril Oettinger (150512), Royal Air Force Volunteer Reserve.
- Flight Lieutenant Sidney Ralph Roberts (123459), Royal Air Force Volunteer Reserve.
- Flight Lieutenant Peter Archibald Rowell (115449), Royal Air Force Volunteer Reserve.
- Flight Lieutenant Peter Donald Thorne (125469), Royal Air Force Volunteer Reserve.
- Flight Lieutenant George Raymond Tozer (143290), Royal Air Force Volunteer Reserve.
- Flight Lieutenant Martin Tuck (175870), Royal Air Force Volunteer Reserve.
- Flight Lieutenant James Donald Wakefield Willis (44972).
- Flying Officer Raymond Charles Cooledge (56646).
- Flying Officer Patrick Francis Griffiths (195170), Royal Air Force Volunteer Reserve.
- Flying Officer John Gibson Robson (196402), Royal Air Force Volunteer Reserve.
- Flying Officer Peter Henry Stanton Taylor (194017), Royal Air Force Volunteer Reserve.

Royal Canadian Air Force

- Squadron Leader James Frank MacDonald Bell (Can/J.4821).

Royal New Zealand Air Force

- Acting Squadron Leader Stanley Livingston (N.Z.2460).

Royal Australian Air Force

- Squadron Leader Anthony Bowman Jay (Aus.4O7061).
- Squadron Leader James William Stone (Aus.407689).
- Acting Squadron Leader Edward Heaton Loneragan (Aus.252358).
- Flight Lieutenant Ray Harold Hornby (Aus.403053).
- Flight Lieutenant William McCallum (Aus.404446).
- Flight Lieutenant Rex Leslie Sprake (Aus.408786).
- Pilot Officer Harold Willoughby Bates (Aus.409017).
- Pilot Officer Raymond Leslie Stapleton (Aus.419394).

==== Bars to Air Force Cross ====
- Acting Squadron Leader Cecil Venn Haines, AFC (43639), Royal Air Force.

=== Air Force Medals (AFM) ===
- 522000 Pilot II Peter Domenico Bayetto, Royal Air Force.
- 798799 Navigator II John Garland Stratton, Royal Air Force Volunteer Reserve.
- 637765 Signaller II Samuel Dow, Royal Air Force.
- 1455024 Signaller II Gordon Stobbart, Royal Air Force Volunteer Reserve.
- 1819421 Engineer II Samuel Thomas Gwynne Price, Royal Air Force Volunteer Reserve.

=== King's Commendations For Brave Conduct ===
- Flight Lieutenant E. A. Croker (160695), Royal Air Force Volunteer Reserve.
- 714178 Acting Corporal R. H. Hanson, Royal Air Force Volunteer Reserve.

=== King's Commendations for Valuable Service in the Air ===
United Kingdom

- Captain Kenneth Maxwell Cass, No. 8 Line, British Overseas Airways Corporation.
- Gerald Walter Cussans, 1st Radio Officer, British Overseas Airways Corporation.
- Douglas Geoffrey Dodson, Line Navigation Officer, No. 1 Line, British Overseas Airways Corporation.
- Eric Oswald Draper, 1st Engineer Officer, British Overseas Airways Corporation.
- Captain Frank Ronald Garside, Senior Captain 2nd Class, British Overseas Airways Corporation.
- Frank Mitchell, 1st Radio Officer, No. 2 Line, British Overseas Airways Corporation.
- Captain Edward Rotheram, Senior Captain 2nd Class, British Overseas Airways Corporation.
- Henry George Sherwood, Flight Commander, Central Training School, British Overseas Airways Corporation.

Royal Air Force

- Acting Squadron Leader A. V. Plowright (63476), Royal Air Force Volunteer Reserve.
- Acting Squadron Leader I. G. Stewart (44541).
- Flight Lieutenant L. S. Bevis (171382), Royal Air Force Volunteer Reserve.
- Flight Lieutenant G. C. Cave (116963), Royal Air Force Volunteer Reserve.
- Flight Lieutenant W. T. Ellis (110331).
- Flight Lieutenant P. Goswell (54800).
- Flight Lieutenant A. K. Grayson (113988), Royal Air Force Volunteer Reserve.
- Flight Lieutenant E. L. Jacobs (154831), Royal Air Force Volunteer Reserve.
- Flight Lieutenant E. G. H. Jenner (53218).
- Flight Lieutenant D. C. L. Kearns (151961), Royal Air Force Volunteer Reserve.
- Flight Lieutenant C. G. Lewis (55132).
- Flight Lieutenant R. McC. Mathieson (178787) Royal Air Force Volunteer Reserve.
- Flight Lieutenant R. G. Ravenscroft (49223).
- Flight Lieutenant P. R. Sandford (141456), Royal Air Force Volunteer Reserve.
- Flying Officer C. E. Flecknell (195642), Royal Air Force Volunteer Reserve.
- Flying Officer H. S. Roake (197136), Royal Air Force Volunteer Reserve.
- 1523047 Pilot II J. Hope, Royal Air Force Volunteer Reserve.
- 574017 Pilot II H. J. Tomlinson.

Royal Navy

- Lieutenant Commander M. F. Fell, DSO, DFC.

Royal Canadian Air Force

- Flying Officer L. M. Harmon (Can/J.27622).
- Flying Officer E. J. Mackie (Can/J.43816).

Royal Australian Air Force

- Flight Lieutenant W. J. Hunter (Aus.404908).
- Flight Lieutenant H. Lawrence (Aus.8368).
- Flight Lieutenant C. Leedham (Aus.411028).
- Flight Lieutenant R. Ogden (Aus.3404).
- Flight Lieutenant J. R. Wastell (Aus.19694).
- Flying Officer J. G. Earl (Aus.422149).
- Warrant Officer J. R. Brown (Aus.8174).
- Warrant Officer R. E. Thomas (Aus.424242).

=== King's Police and Fire Services Medals (KPFSM) ===
England and Wales

- Albert Edwin Lindsay, Chief Constable, Flintshire Constabulary.
- Herbert William Thorpe, Chief Constable, St. Alban's City Police Force.
- George Sydney Lowe, Chief Constable, Sheffield City Police Force.
- Frederick John Baguley, 1st Assistant Chief Constable, Birmingham City Police Force.
- Alfred Barrett, Assistant Chief Constable, Dorset Constabulary.
- George William Downs, MBE, Assistant Chief Constable, Nottingham City Police Force.
- Ernest Walter Lankester, Chief Superintendent and Deputy Chief Constable, East Suffolk Constabulary.
- Ebenezer Afford, Superintendent and Deputy Chief Constable, Huntingdonshire Constabulary.
- Fred Platt, Superintendent, Cheshire Constabulary.
- Leonard Rundle, Superintendent, Metropolitan Police Force.
- Charles Cosway Williams, Sub-Divisional Inspector, Metropolitan Police Force.
- William Henry James Benton, OBE, Chief Regional Fire Officer, No. 4 (Eastern) Fire Region.
- Ernest Francis Batchford, Divisional Officer, No. 15 (Reading) Fire Force.
- Tom Knowles, Staff Officer with the rank of Divisional Officer, No. 9 (Midland) Regional Fire Headquarters, Birmingham.
- Alfred Wooder, Fire Force Commander, No. 34 (London) Fire Force.
- Edward Webster Reanney, Column Officer, No. 26 (Liverpool) Fire Force.

Scotland

- Daniel McDonald, Superintendent, Glasgow City Police Force.
- David Wilson Smart Brown, MBE, Chief Constable of Berwickshire, Roxburghshire and Selkirkshire Constabulary.

Northern Ireland

- Alexander Lindsay, Head Constable, Royal Ulster Constabulary.

Australia

- George Balf Howard, Superintendent 2nd Class, New South Wales Police Force.
- William Edward Sherringham, Superintendent 3rd Class, New South Wales Police Force.
- Thomas Ingrain Courtney, Superintendent 3rd Class, New South Wales Police Force.
- Charles Albert Dein, Superintendent 3rd Class, New South Wales Police Force.
- David Fraser, Superintendent 3rd Class, New South Wales Police Force.
- James Thomson Dunnet, Inspector 1st Class, New South Wales Police Force.

India

- Rao Bahadur Kasragod Patnashetti Janardhana Rao, Deputy Inspector-General of Police, Madras.
- Rao Bahadur Tirupattur Gangadharam Pillai Sanjevi Pillai, Deputy Inspector-General of Police, Madras.
- Cyril Johru Minister, Indian Police, Additional Deputy Inspector-General of Police, C.I.D, Bengal.
- Babu Purna Chandra Nath, Inspector of Police, Noakhali, D.I.B, Bengal.
- George Humble, Assistant Commissioner of Police, H.Q, Calcutta.
- Rai Rajeshwar Prasad, Indian Police, Superintendent of Police, Monghyr, Bihar.
- Brian Patrick Seery, Officiating District Superintendent of Police, Hyderabad District, Sind.
- Rao Saheb Prithvisinh Hamirsinh Raol, Commissioner of Police, Porbandar State.

Burma

- U Tun Ohn, TDM, Burma Police (Class I), Officiating District Superintendent of Police, Thaton.

Colonies, Protectorates and Mandated Territories.

- Charles Turquand Matthey, Deputy Commissioner of Police and Superintendent of the Fire Brigade, British Guiana.
- Jack Nicole, Detective Superintendent of Police, British Guiana.
- William Robert Bernard Pugh, Assistant Superintendent of Police, Kenya.
- Leslie Arding Thomas, lately Deputy Commissioner of Police, Hong Kong.
- Edmund Victor Fowler, Superintendent of Police, Singapore.
