= 1942 British Honduras general election =

General elections were held in British Honduras in 1942.

== Electoral system ==
The Legislative Council consisted of six elected members, four members appointed by the Governor, three officials (the Attorney General, the Colonial Secretary and the Financial Secretary) and the Governor, who served as president. The elected members were elected from five constituencies, one of which (Belize) had two seats.

Voting was limited to British subjects or people who had lived in the territory for at least three years and who were aged 21 or over and met one of the financial requirements, which included paying an annual property tax of at least $6, paying at least $96 in rent a year, or being in receipt of an annual salary of at least $300. Anyone who had received poor relief from public funds in the three months prior to voter registration was ineligible. As a result of the criteria, only 1,383 people from a population of 61,723 were registered to vote.

== Results ==
Constituency	Elected member
Belize	Eric Bowen
Belize	Ricardo Meighan
Cayo	Salvador Espat
Northern	Robert Turton
Stann Creek	Henry Bowman
Toledo	Samuel Vernon
Source: British Honduras Gazette

The nominated members were appointed on 27 May, with James Wilson Macmillan, Calvert Milford Staine, Neil Stuart Stevenson and Arthur Norman Wolffsohn appointed.
