= 1939 British Honduras general election =

General elections were held in British Honduras in March and April 1939.

== Electoral system ==
The Legislative Council consisted of six elected members, four members appointed by the Governor, three officials (the Attorney General, the Colonial Secretary and the Financial Secretary) and the Governor, who served as president. The elected members were elected from five constituencies, one of which (Belize) had two seats.

Voting was limited to British subjects or people who had lived in the territory for at least three years and who were aged 21 or over and met one of the financial requirements, which included paying an annual property tax of at least $6, paying at least $96 in rent a year, or being in receipt of an annual salary of at least $300. Anyone who had received poor relief from public funds in the three months prior to voter registration was ineligible. As a result of the criteria, only 1,155 people from a population of 58,759 were registered to vote.

== Results ==
Constituency	Date	Elected member
Belize	13 March	Arthur Balderamos
Belize	13 March	Edward Usher
Northern		Robert Turton
Stann Creek	1 April	Henry Bowman
Toledo		Samuel Vernon
Western	4 April	Eric Bowen
Source: British Honduras Gazette

The nominated members were appointed on 29 March, with Henry Llewellyn Gabourel, K. Heusner, Neil Stuart Stevenson and Arthur Norman Wolffsohn appointed.
