= William Linehan =

Irish colonial administrative service officer (1892-1955)

William Linehan CMG
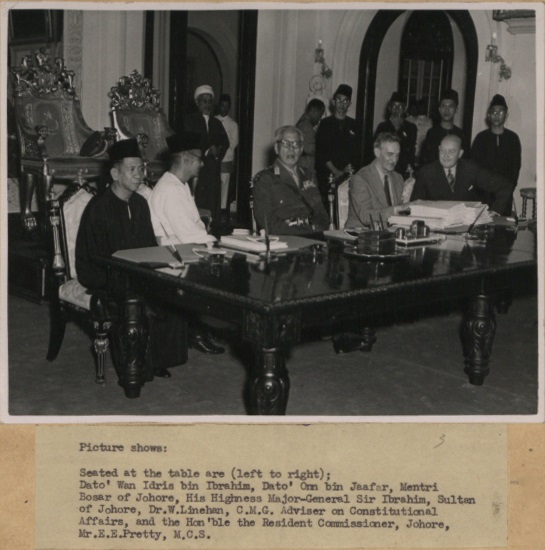
- Linehan (second right) at the signing of the Federation of Malaya agreement in 1948
- Born: 6 August 1892; Cork
- Died: 19 October 1955 (aged 63); Dublin
- Education: University College, Cork
- Occupation: Colonial administrative service officer
- Years active: 1916 to 1955
- Children: 3 sons and 1 daughter

William Linehan CMG (6 August 1892 – 19 October 1955) was a scholar and colonial administrator who served his career in Malaya. He was a member of the committee which drafted the Federation of Malaya agreement which established the Federation of Malaya in 1948.

== Early life and education ==
Linehan was born in Cork on 6 August 1892, the son of Irish senator Thomas Linehan. He was educated at Christian Brothers College, Cork and at University College Cork.

== Career ==
Linhan joined the Malayan civil service as a cadet in 1916 and served in various posts including District Officer, Pekan (1925); acting British Adviser, Kelantan (1931–1933); Assistant Adviser, Johore (1934); and Secretary to the British Resident, Perak (1937).

In 1938, he was appointed Director of Education of the Straits Settlements and Adviser of Education of the Malay States. After being interned in Singapore as a POW (1942–1945), he returned to office in 1945 as Director of Education of the Malay States. In 1946, he was appointed constitutional adviser to the government and played a considerable part as a member of the working committee which drafted the Federation of Malaya agreement which established the Federation of Malaya in 1948. In 1948, he retired from the Malayan civil service and became Director of Museums of the Federation of Malaya (1949–1951).

== Writer ==
In 1955, after returning to England, Linehan was appointed Assistant Director of Research in Oriental Studies at the University of Cambridge. He was one of the best known scholars in Malaya and his work on Malay history, archaeology and language was considerable. In 1938, he was president of the International Congress of Prehistorians of the Far East in Singapore. In addition to his MA, he was awarded a degree of Doctor of Literature (D.Litt) by Dublin University. His publications included: The History of Pahang (1936), and numerous papers for the Malaysian branch of Royal Asiatic Society.

== Personal life and death ==
Linehan married Mary O'Sullivan in 1921 and they had three sons and a daughter. He died on 19 October 1955, aged 63, in Dublin.

== Honours ==
Linehan was appointed Companion of the Order of St Michael and St George (CMG) in the 1947 New Year Honours.
