= Henry Osmond-Clarke =

British orthopaedic surgeon

Sir Henry Osmond Osmond-Clarke KCVO CBE (8 February 1905 – 24 October 1986), also known as Nobby Clarke, was a British orthopaedic surgeon.

Osmond-Clarke was born at Brookeborough, County Fermanagh and trained at Trinity College, Dublin. He was appointed in a consultant in 1936 at Crumpsall Hospital, the same year he was elected Hunterian Professor. and later at the Royal National Orthopaedic Hospital. He was a visiting surgeon at the Robert Jones and Agnes Hunt Hospital for more than 40 years.

Osmond-Clarke was a member of the Council of the Royal College of Surgeons from 1959 to 1975 and Orthopaedic Surgeon to the Queen from 1965 to 1973.

Osmond-Clarke was appointed Knight Commander of the Royal Victorian Order in the 1969 New Year Honours.
