= Davenport Fabian Cartwright Blunt =

You

- Born: 19 January 1888; Bedford, Bedfordshire, England
- Died: 28 December 1965 (aged 77); Lewisham, London, England
- Education: Bedford Modern School
- Occupation: Civil Servant
- Known for: Under-Secretary at HM Treasury

Davenport Fabian Cartwright Blunt CB (19 January 1888 – 28 December 1965) was a British Civil Servant who became Under-Secretary at HM Treasury.

== Life ==
Blunt was born in Bedford on 19 January 1888 the son of Harry and Agnes Blunt. Blunt's father was a tutor and Blunt himself was educated at Bedford Modern School.

After school, Blunt joined the civil service and by 1911 was already an examiner in the exchequer and audit department. He moved to HM Treasury in 1939, where he was Under-Secretary between 1946 and 1948. In 1948 he was signatory to an international treaty between the United Kingdom and the United States Army the purpose of which was to settle payments between the two countries during World War II.

Blunt was a member of the Official Committee on Atomic Energy which sat between 1947 and 1957, the purpose of which was to 'consider questions in the field of atomic energy which call for discussions between Departments', and to provide advice to Ministers in the early days of that industry.

In 1947 he was made a Companion of the Order of the Bath. Blunt married Edith Harris in London in 1911. He died aged 77 on 28 December 1965 in Lewisham, London.
