= Arthur Wolffsohn =

Sir Arthur Norman Wolffsohn, CMG, OBE (30 September 1888 – 17 November 1967) was Speaker of the Legislative Assembly of British Honduras from 1954 to 1961.
