= Crieff Hydro =

Hotel in Crieff, Perth and Kinross, Scotland

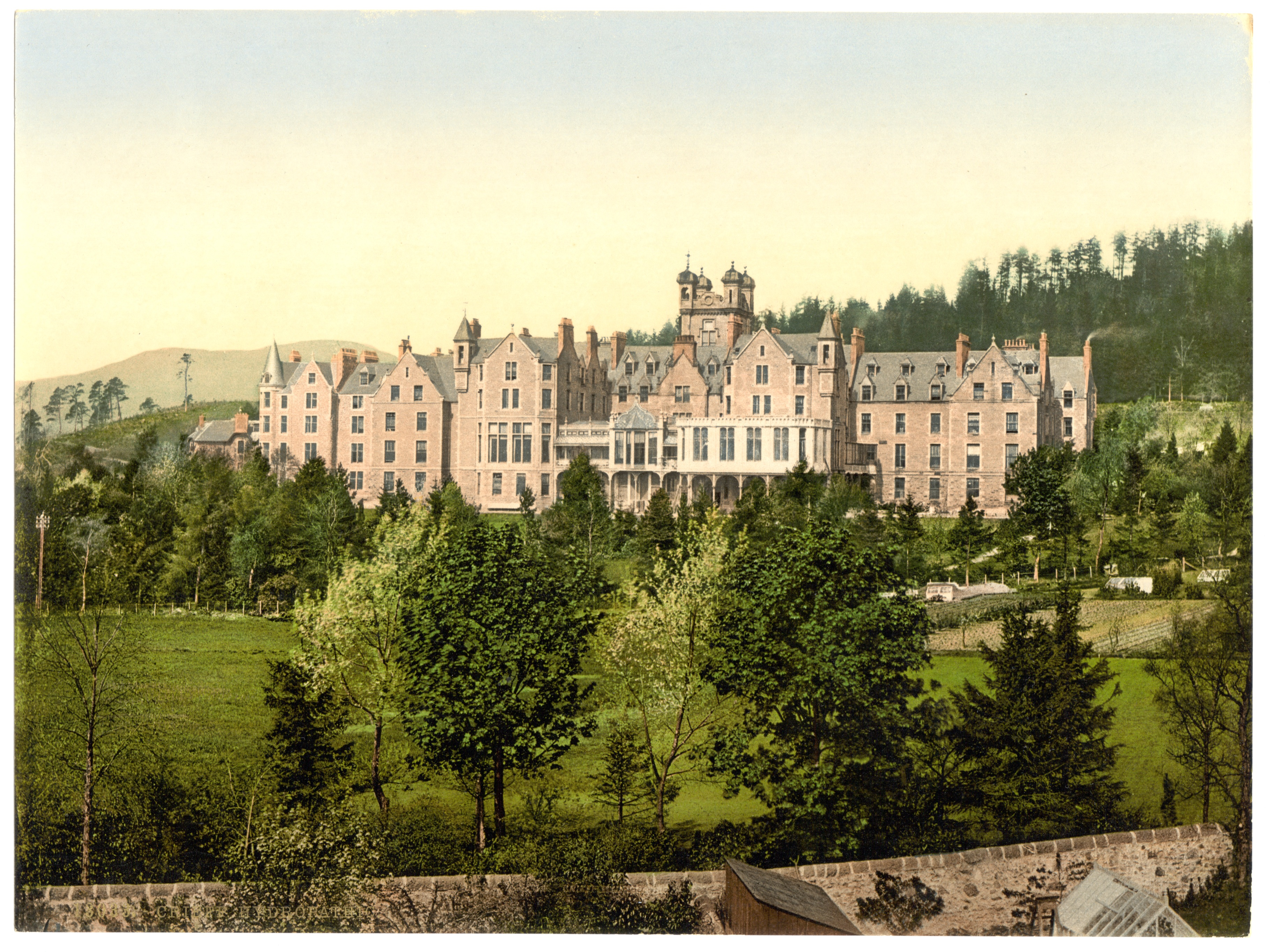
- The Crieff Hydropathic, c. 1890

- Location within Perth and Kinross

General information
- Location: Crieff, Perth and Kinross, Scotland, United Kingdom
- Coordinates: 56.37978°N 3.83763°W
- Opening: 1868

Design and construction
- Architect: Robert Ewan
- Developer: Dr Thomas Meikle

Other information
- Number of rooms: >200 and 50 self-catering lodges
- Number of restaurants: 6

Website
- www.crieffhydro.com

Crieff Hydro is a hotel in Crieff, Perthshire, Scotland. The purpose-built hotel opened in 1868 as the Crieff Hydropathic Establishment, and is locally known as the Hydro. It was founded in 1868 by Dr Thomas Henry Meikle, who had received treatment at a centre in Gräfenberg, Austria (now known as Lázně Jeseník, Czech Republic), where Vincenz Priessnitz had built such an establishment. Preissnitz based his pharmacopeia on water, exercise, fresh mountain air, water treatments in the brooks and simple country food.

== History ==
In 1857, Dr Meikle, a recent medical graduate from the University of Edinburgh, observed Priessnitz's work and whilst being personally disparaging of him for his non-medical background, took back some of his principles for his new hydropathic establishment in Aberdeen, Scotland. When Priessnitz came to Britain on a visit promoted by the publications of Captain R. T. Claridge, a prominent booster of his methods, The Lancet was particularly scathing about his work, describing him as a charlatan and a fraud. However, Dr James Manby Gully, also an Edinburgh medical graduate, picked up on the "water cure", his most famous patient being Charles Darwin, who attended Gully's establishment in Malvern, Worcestershire.

In 1861 Thomas bought the Lochhead Hydropathic Hotel in the Westburn district of Aberdeen which had been founded in 1851 by Rev Alexander Munro but bought by his late brother, Dr William Meikle soon thereafter. Thomas Meikle immediately added a new wing of Victorian Turkish baths. However in 1868 he decided to move to Crieff. Importantly no alcohol was sold in the hotel (this remained in place until 1994).

Built in 1868 during the second wave of such establishments in the UK in the later part of the 19th century, Crieff Hydro utilised the Caledonian Railway to bring a prosperous, sober clientele from the lowlands of Scotland to take the cure in upmarket conditions. The architect of the original Scots-Jacobean style building, built at a cost of £30,000, was Robert Ewan, but the original building was extended in the later heyday of hydropathic spas in 1893–94.

It was successful from the start and, from a stable of 20 such establishments across Scotland at the peak, is one of only two left, the other being Peebles Hydro in Peebles in similar upland surroundings. Priessnitz considered mountain scenery an essential background to his Nature Cure. By 1874, as medical superintendent, Dr Meikle was drawing a salary of £500 per annum, receiving dividends on his investment at the maximum of 7% and getting an extraordinary £279 as an ex gratia payment. It was rather self-contained, farming its own estate until recently, and possessing its own hydroelectricity station, fed from Loch Turret until 1968, (now part of the seven-station Breadalbane hydroelectric scheme) and its own laundry. The company still has only 160 shareholders.

It has been a Category B listed building since 1971.

=== Regime ===
The principles of the establishment were decidedly firm and of a Protestant religious character (notably the United Presbyterians and the Evangelical Union favoured the establishment), with a fine of one penny being levied for those who missed grace before meals. It still has a large room, used for worship services, with a full-size organ. The establishment was teetotal until 1994 when the first bar was placed within the Highlandman Room - Today the hotel has several bars including The Meikle, The Hub and The Brasserie that have adjoining eateries. It is run by the great, great, great, grand nephew of the original founder and medical superintendent. It became a favourite destination for alcoholics to dry-out. It offered and continues to offer cheap rates for Church of Scotland ministers out of season, though they are not required now to lead daily prayers. Smoking was also disapproved of, though not banned, a small and obscure room being set aside for smokers' use.

== Today ==
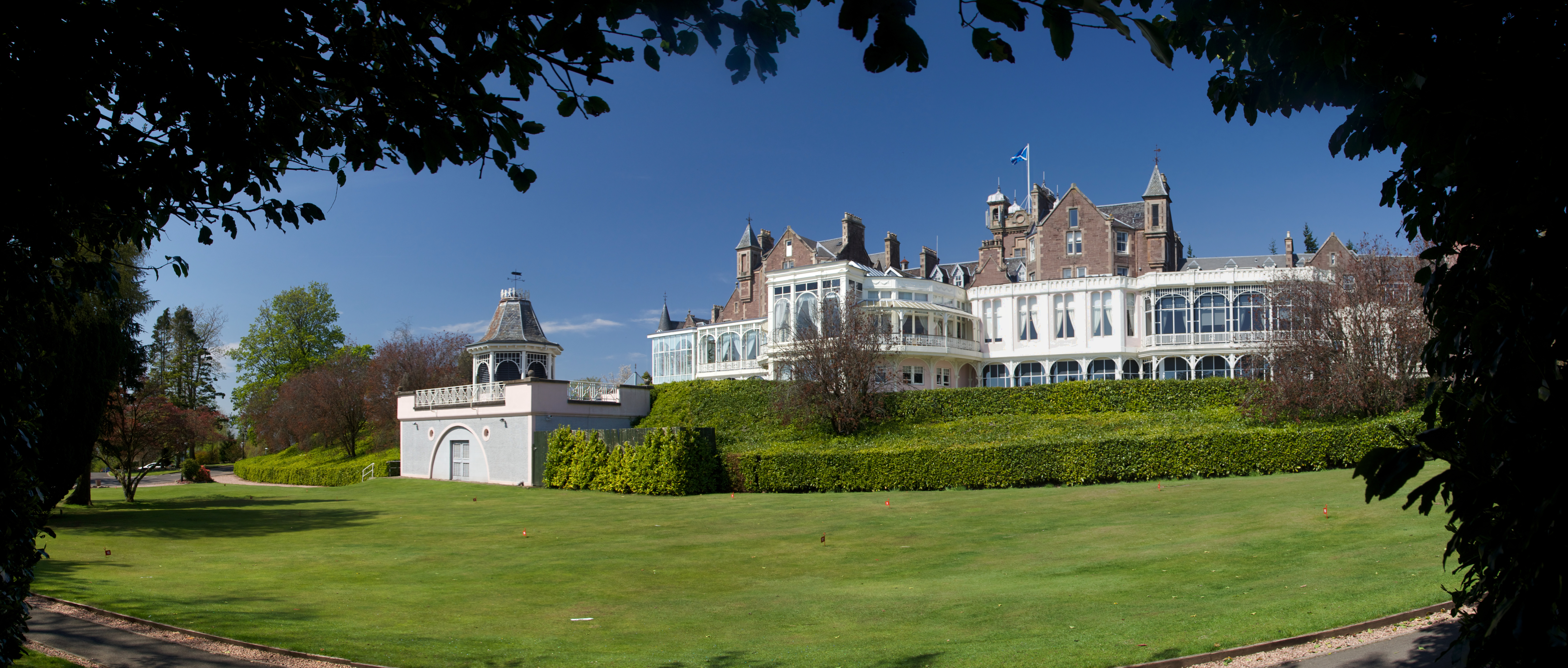
The Crieff Hydro in 2016

The hotel operates as a 4/5* resort with over 200 bedrooms, over 50 self-catering properties and a dozen meeting rooms for conferences. The main restaurant, a Victorian dining room, is named after the founder. The hotel has over 60 facilities for indoor and outdoor pursuits such as a golf course, riding stables, a gym, swimming pools, 5-a-side football pitches and, basketball, badminton and squash courts. In 2006 the Resort opened BIG Country, a registered childcare facility offering free childcare to over 100 children of resort guests simultaneously. It is run by Stephen Leckie, the great-great-great-grand nephew of the founder. The Hotel group includes Peebles Hydro, the Park Hotel in Peebles, the Ballachulish Hotel, the Isles of Glencoe Hotel and Leisure Centre and Murraypark Hotel.
