= Priessnitz =

Priessnitz or Prießnitz may refer to:

- Prießnitz, a village in Saxony-Anhalt, Germany
- Prießnitz (Elbe), a river of Saxony, Germany
- Priessnitz (band), a rock band from the Czech Republic

== People with that surname ==
- Vincenz Priessnitz (1799–1851), pioneer of hydrotherapy
