= Švejdík =

Švejdík is a Czech surname. Notable people with the surname include:

- Jaromír Švejdík (fl. 1989–2016, member of the Czech band Priessnitz
- Marcel Švejdík (born 1973), Czech footballer
- Ondřej Švejdík (born 1982), Czech footballer
