= Jeseník =

Town in the Czech Republic

- Town
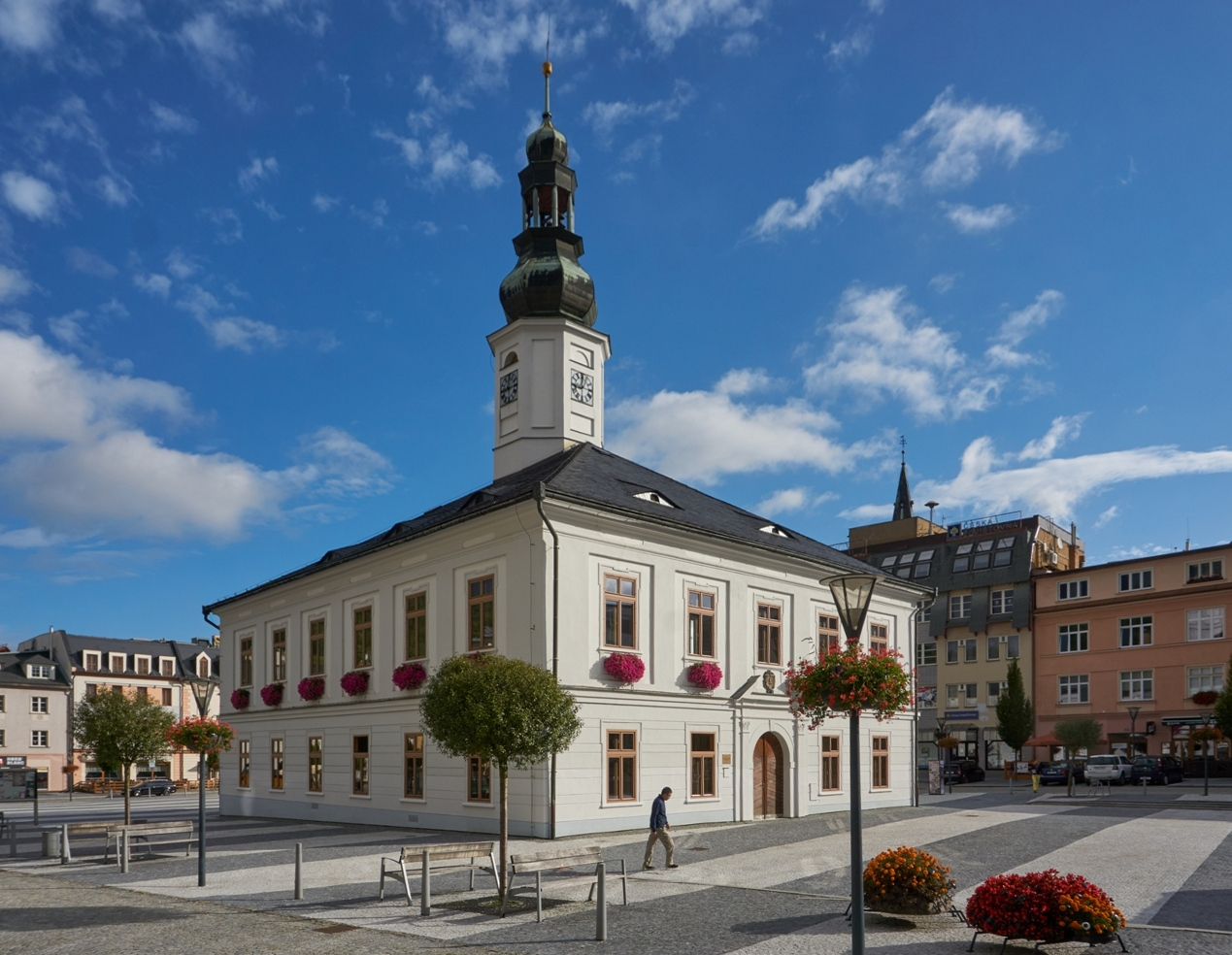
- Town hall

- Flag Coat of arms

- Location in the Czech Republic
- Coordinates: 50°13′47″N 17°12′17″E
- Country: Czech Republic
- Region: Olomouc
- District: Jeseník
- First mentioned: 1267

Government
  - Mayor: Dušan Antálek (Pro Jeseník)

Area
  - Total: 38.23 km^{2} (14.76 sq mi)
- Elevation: 432 m (1,417 ft)

Population (2026-01-01)
  - Total: 10,324
  - Density: 270.0/km^{2} (699.4/sq mi)
- Time zone: UTC+1 (CET)
  - Summer (DST): UTC+2 (CEST)
- Postal code: 790 01
- Website: www.jesenik.cz

Jeseník (Czech pronunciation: [ˈjɛsɛɲiːk]; until 1947 Frývaldov; German: Freiwaldau) is a spa town in the Olomouc Region of the Czech Republic. It has about 10,000 inhabitants. The town is located in a hilly lansdcape on the Bělá River.

Jeseník was founded in the 13th century and its development was connected with iron one mining and processing. The town is known for the Priessnitz Medical Spa, founded here by Vincenz Priessnitz in 1822 as the world's first hydrotherapy institute.

== Administrative division ==
Jeseník consists of three municipal parts (in brackets population according to the 2021 census):

- Jeseník (8,869)
- Bukovice (1,546)
- Dětřichov (128)

== Etymology ==
The original name of Jeseník was Freiwaldau/Frývaldov, deriving from German frei vom Walde, meaning "free from the woods". The name first appeared in Latin documents under the name Vriwald and later as Vrowald, Vrienwalde and Freynwalde. The Czech name of Frývaldov was a phonetic transcription of the German name.

After World War II, the town was renamed along with many other towns containing German elements in their names. It is named after the surrounding mountains, which are called Hrubý Jeseník or Jeseníky.

== Geography ==
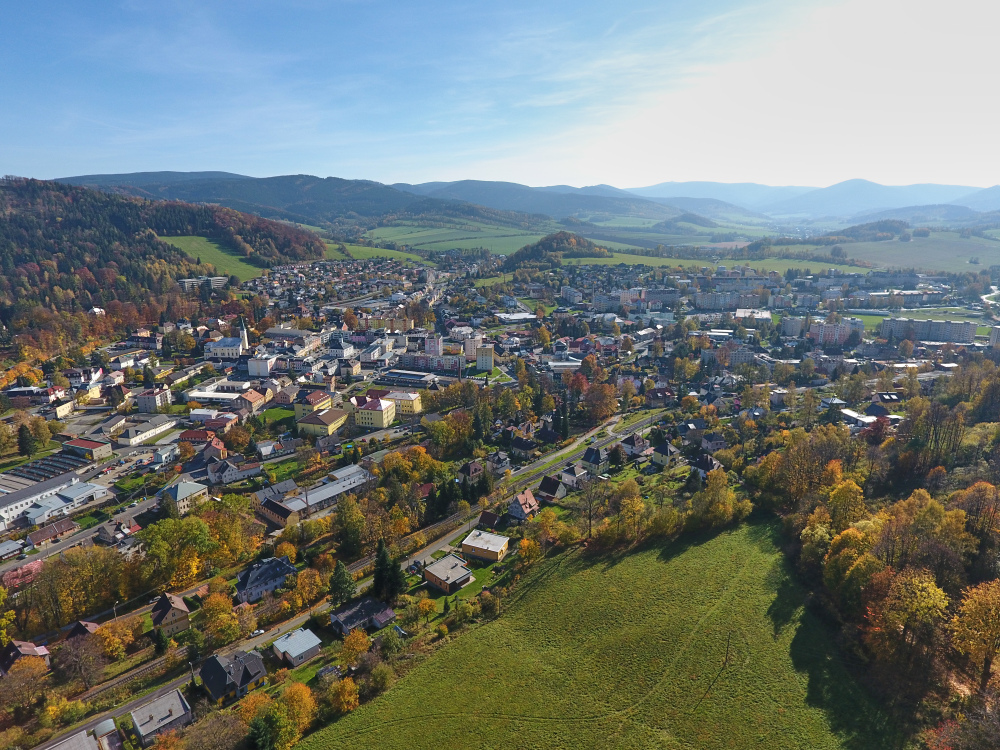
View of Jeseník

Jeseník is located about 70 kilometres (43 mi) north of Olomouc, in the historical land of Czech Silesia. It lies at the confluence of the Bělá River and the Staříč Stream. The valley of these watercourses belongs to the Zlatohorská Highlands. The southern part of the municipal territory is situated in the Hrubý Jeseník mountain range. The northern part extends to the Golden Mountains. The highest point of the municipal territory is the Velké Bradlo mountain at 1,050 m (3,445 ft) above sea level.

== History ==
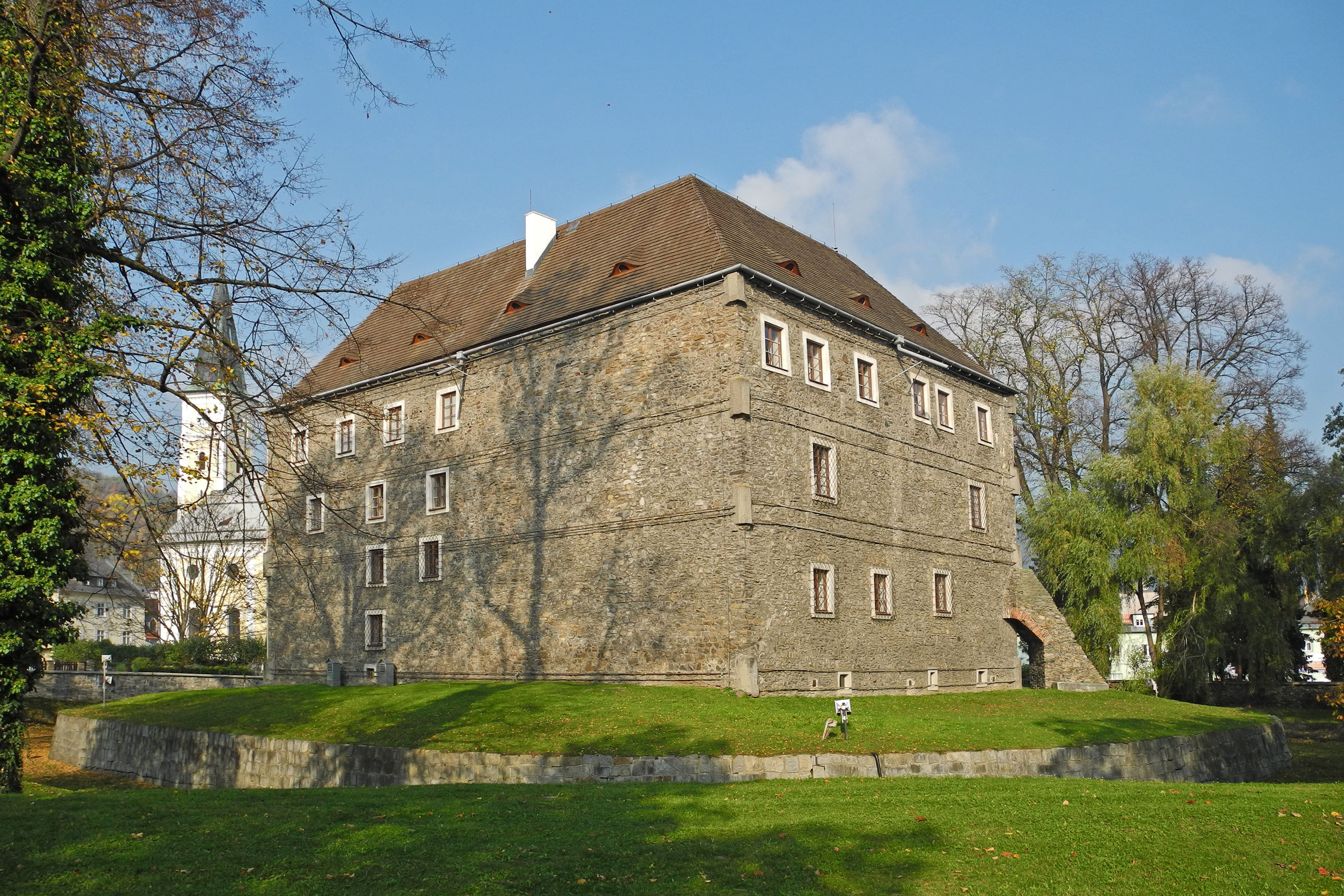
Water Fortress

=== 13th century ===
The first written mention of Jeseník is from 1267. It was probably founded during the colonisation of the territory by the bishops of Wrocław, who acquired the area in 1199. It became a town between 1284 and 1295, thanks to the development caused by its strategic location on a trade route from Moravia to Silesia and on the confluence of two rivers, and thanks to the iron ore deposits in the surroundings. In 1284 at the latest, a castle had to stand here.

=== 14th–16th centuries ===
In the 14th century, the town developed as a centre of iron one processing. The first mention of the iron ore processing is from 1326, when thirteen hammer mills were already operating here. However, mining ended already at the end of the 14th century. In the second half of the 15th century, gold and silver were mined here.

From 1378 to 1463, the town was owned by the Mušín family. In the following decades it often changed owners. In 1506, the flourishing town was purchased by the Swabian Fugger dynasty who resumed mining activity. In the same year, the town obtained the Bergregal privileges. The iron ore deposits were soon exhausted or have become unprofitable, and the Fuggers sold the town back to the Wrocław bishops in 1547. The town developed crafts and gained many guild privileges at the turn of the 16th and 17th centuries. Linen weaving became the most important source of income.

=== 17th–19th centuries ===
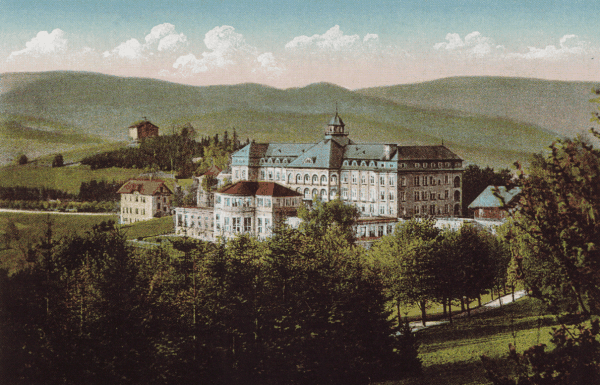
Jeseník spa in the early 20th century

Jeseník was damaged several times during the Thirty Years' War. Between the years 1622 and 1684, the town was in the centre of the infamous Northern Moravia witch trials. A large fire severely damaged the town in 1696. Despite the difficulties, economic prosperity continued until 1742, when Jeseník became part of Austrian Silesia after the First Silesian War. Due to the loss of Silesian markets as the main customer of production, linen got into a crisis and the town lost its mining privileges.

New economic development occurred in the 19th century, when industrialisation began and new factories and enterprises were established. Significant and world-famous was the Regenhart u. Rayman textile factory, established in 1822. The opening of the railway in 1888 also helped the development of the town. In 1808, the Grabenberg hamlet (later known as Gräfenberg/Gräfenberk, today Lázně Jeseník) was founded, and the spa was established here in the 1820s. Gräfenberg was incorporated into the town in 1868.

=== 20th–21st centuries ===
Jeseník remained with the Austrian Empire and the Austro-Hungarian Monarchy until World War I and the creation of Czechoslovakia in 1918. According to the Austro-Hungarian census of 1910, the town had 6,859 inhabitants, with 6,588 (99.5%) were speaking German, 16 Czech and 13 Polish. Jews were not allowed to declare Yiddish, most of them thus declared German. Most populous religious groups were Roman Catholics with 6,552 (95.5%), followed by Protestants with 208 (3%) and the Jews with 83 (1.2%).

In 1938, Jeseník was ceded to Nazi Germany as a result of the Munich Agreement. It was administered as a part of the Reichsgau Sudetenland. During World War II, the German occupiers operated several forced labour subcamps of the Stalag VIII-B/344 prisoner-of-war camp in the town. The town was restored to Czechoslovakia after the defeat of Nazi Germany in World War II in 1945. The German population was expelled according to the Potsdam Agreement and Beneš Decrees in 1945.

In 1950, Bukovice and Dětřichov were joined to Jeseník. The town was damaged by the 1997 and 2024 floods.

== Demographics ==
Historical population

Year	Pop.	±%
1869	7,149	—
1880	7,799	+9.1%
1890	8,435	+8.2%
1900	8,718	+3.4%
1910	9,242	+6.0%

Year	Pop.	±%
1921	8,956	−3.1%
1930	10,584	+18.2%
1950	8,583	−18.9%
1961	8,914	+3.9%
1970	9,957	+11.7%

Year	Pop.	±%
1980	12,342	+24.0%
1991	13,039	+5.6%
2001	12,700	−2.6%
2011	11,465	−9.7%
2021	10,543	−8.0%

Source: Censuses

== Economy ==
The town is known for the Priessnitz Medical Spa. Vincenz Priessnitz founded here the world's first hydrotherapy institute in 1822. Today the spa forms large spa resort on the northern outskirts of the town. The spa is visited by people from all over Europe.

== Transport ==
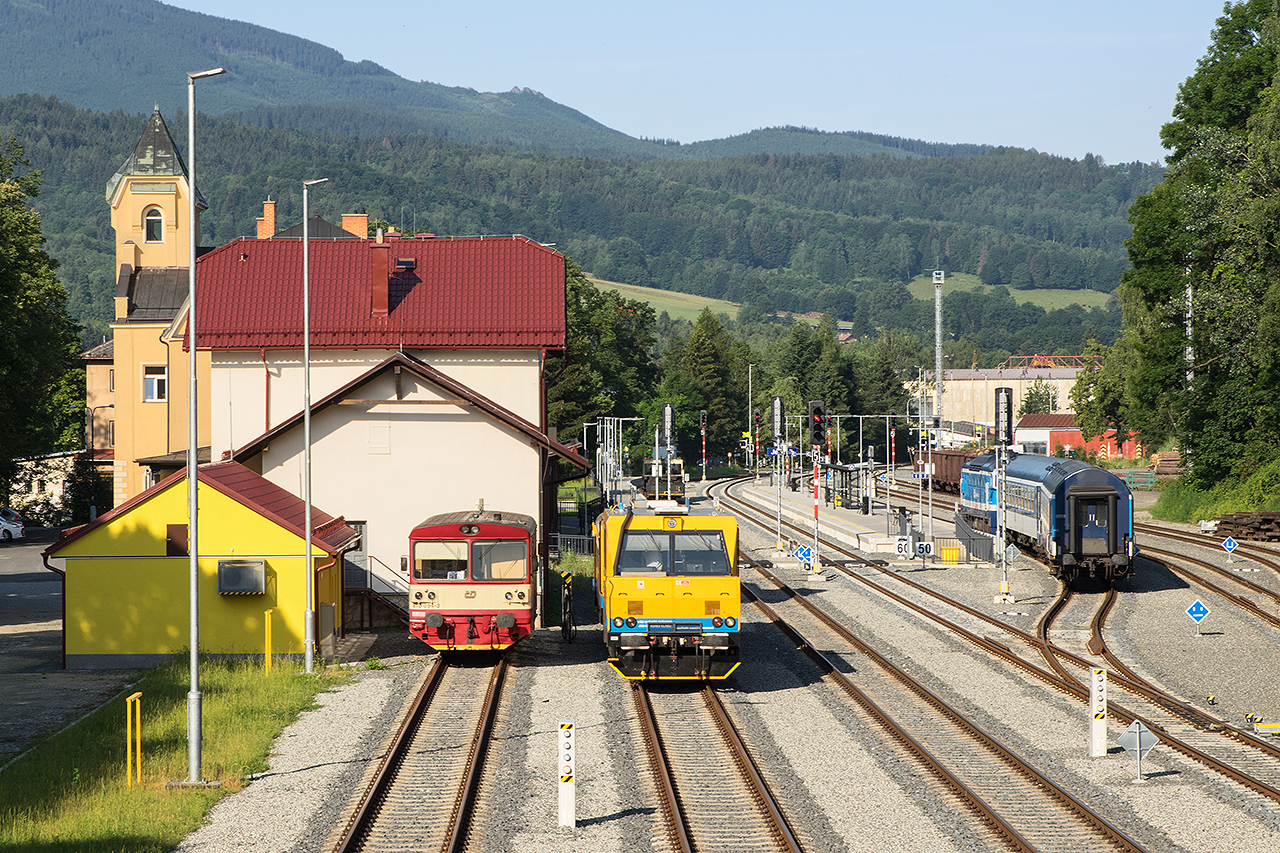
Train station in Jeseník

Jeseník is located on the railway lines Šumperk–Jeseník and Krnov–Jeseník.

== Sights ==
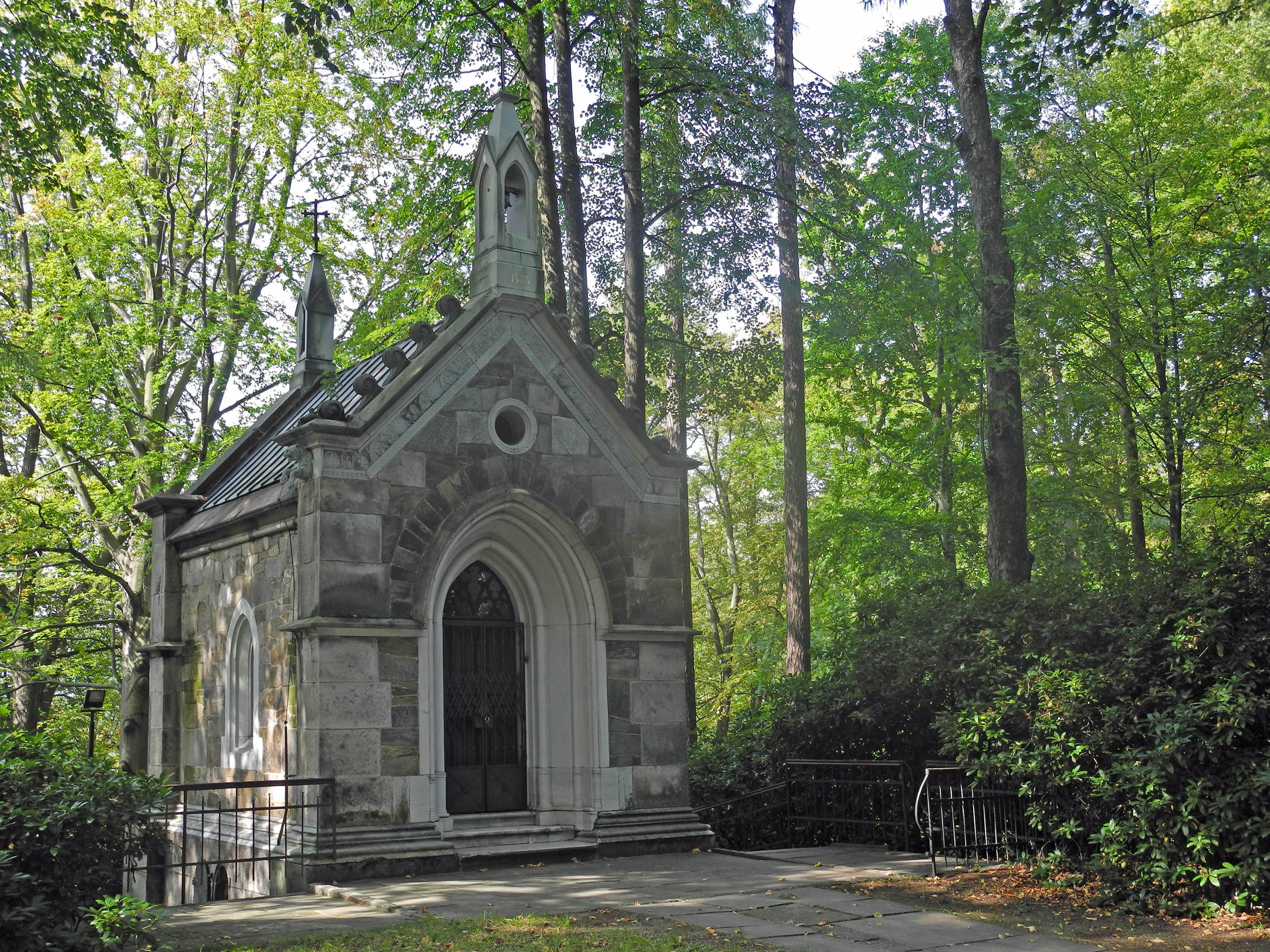
Tomb of Vincenz Priessnitz

Jeseník is poor in historical monuments. The oldest and most important monument in the town is the Jeseník Water Fortress. This Gothic castle from the 13th century was first documented in 1374. Since 1989, it has been owned by the state and houses the regional museum with permanent exhibitions on regional history, Northern Moravia witch trials, and geomorphology.

The town hall dates from 1710. It has Renaissance core from the previous building from 1610, which was destroyed by fire in 1625.

There are several monuments in the town associated with the most important native, Vincenz Priessnitz. The tomb of Vincenz Priessnitz was built in 1853 and is today a protected heritage site. In 1909, the Monument to Vincenz Priessnitz was unveiled. It is 10 to 6 metres (33 to 20 ft) large and the statue of a healer measures 2.85 metres (9.4 ft). Today, his birth house is a museum of his life and work, administered by the regional museum.

The Polish Monument is a valuable sculpture from the 1890s documenting the importance of the local spa. At its top is a bronze crowned eagle with outstretched wings on a sphere. During the renovation in 2005, notes were discovered in its foundation, which contained a protest against the Partitions of Poland.

== Notable people ==
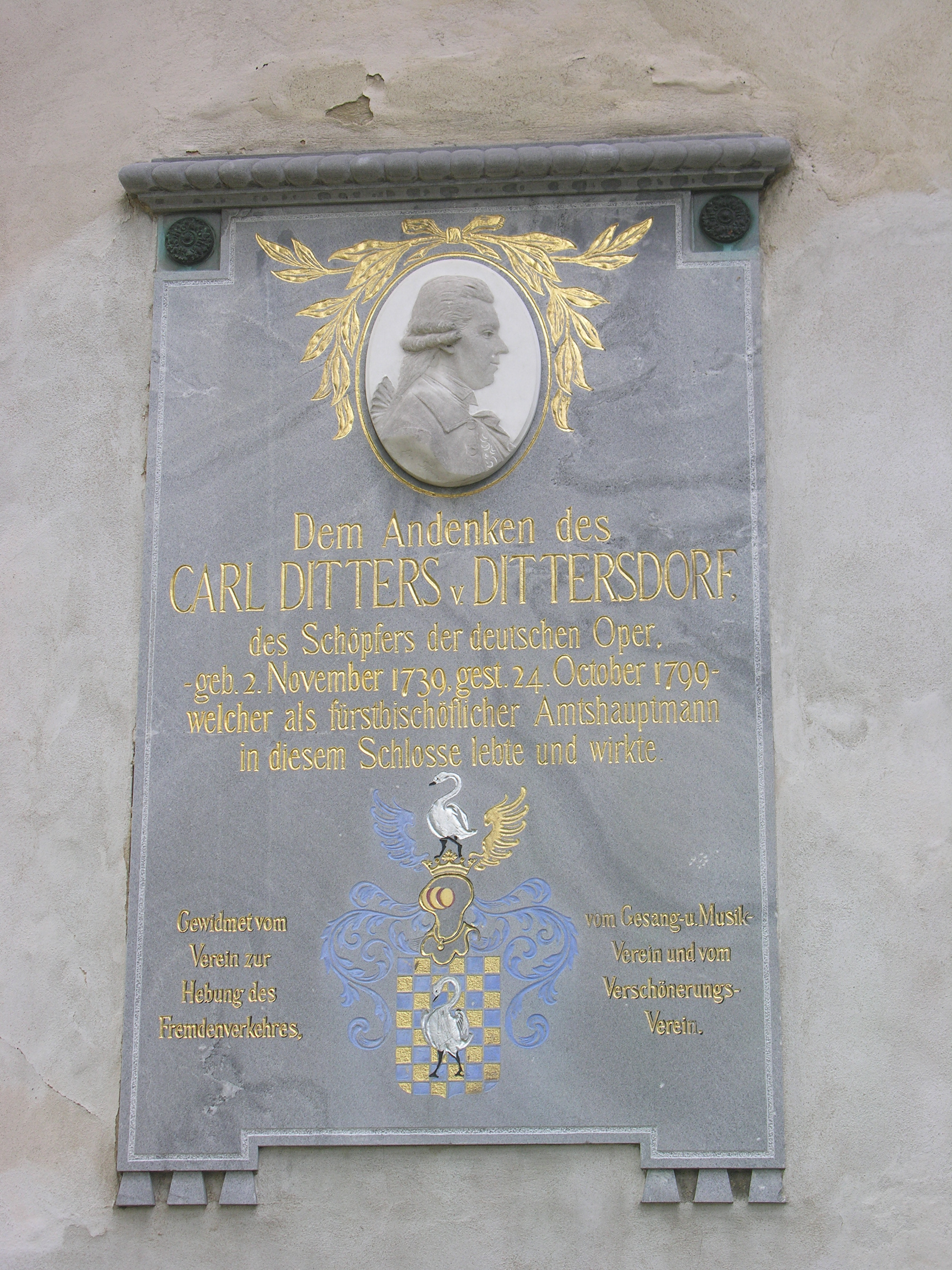
Plate of C. Ditters von Dittersdorf

- Carl Ditters von Dittersdorf (1739–1799), Austrian composer and violinist; worked here as bishop's governor in 1773–1794
- Vincenz Priessnitz (1799–1851), founder of hydrotherapy
- Oscar Paul (1836–1898), German musicologist
- Edmund Weiss (1837–1917), Austrian astronomer
- Károly Khuen-Héderváry (1849–1918), Hungarian politician
- Walter Reder (1915–1991), Austrian SS commander and war criminal
- Diether Kunerth (1940–2024), German contemporary artist
- Luboš Pospíšil (born 1950), singer-songwriter
- Jiří Švub (1958–2013), cross-country skier
- Jirko Malchárek (born 1966), Slovak politician and racing driver
- Anastasia Pustovoitova (born 1981), Russian football referee
- Loukas Mavrokefalidis (born 1984), Greek basketball player
- Petr Ševčík (born 1994), footballer

== Twin towns – sister cities ==
Jeseník is twinned with:

- Bojnice, Slovakia
- Głuchołazy, Poland
- Neuburg an der Donau, Germany
- Nysa, Poland

Jeseník also cooperates with Prague 1 in the Czech Republic.
