= Peebles Hydro =

Hotel in Peebles, Scotland

Coordinates: 55.6526°N 3.1772°W

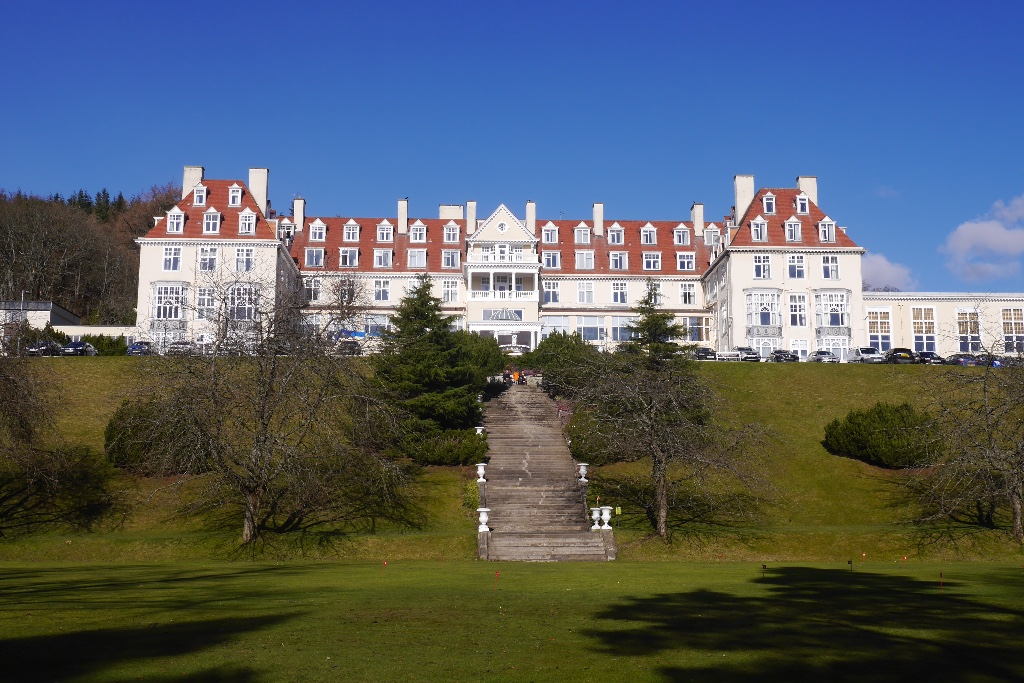
- Interactive map of the Peebles Hydro area

General information
- Location: Innerleithen Road, Peebles, EH45 8LX
- Opening: 1881
- Owner: Crieff Hydro

Design and construction
- Architect: James Miller
- Developer: Hydropathic Company

Other information
- Number of rooms: 132

Website
- peebleshydro.co.uk

Peebles Hydro is an early-20th-century hotel and spa resort in Peebles, in the historic county of Peebles-shire in the Scottish Borders. It is one of two hydropathic hotels that remain open in Scotland, the other being Crieff Hydro in Perthshire.

The hotel opened in 1881, but burnt down and was rebuilt in 1907. It served as a hospital for injured service personnel during the First World War before reverting to hotel use. Peebles Hydro is a category B listed building, and is still operated as a hotel.

== History ==
Peebles Hydro was designed in 1878 by John Starforth. It was opened by the Hydropathic Company in 1881 to provide water cures and hydrotherapy remedies (pain-relief and treating illness) to guests. It was one of many such hotels built in Britain during the second half of the 19th century. It was near two railway stations: Peebles West railway station of the Caledonian Railway (later London, Midland and Scottish Railway), and Peebles East of the North British Railway (later London and North Eastern Railway). It began building in 1878. Work was completed early in 1881 at a cost of over £70,000. The architect was John Starforth (1828–1898), a pupil of David Bryce. The Hydro burnt down in July 1905 and was rebuilt by 1907, a building designed by the architect James Miller of Glasgow, at a more moderate cost of £37,000 owing to the use of salvaged materials.

Peebles Hydro was requisitioned during the First World War as a Naval Hospital. In 1939, it was requisitioned once more and taken over by the Royal Army Medical Corps as a Military General Hospital.

The main building provided 1,200 beds, with X-ray facilities and two operating theatres.

"In spite of this it was re-opened and functioning as a hotel once more by August 1946 and has remained a significant landmark in Peebles ever since.

In the same year, the skill and enthusiasm of Peebles Fire Brigade was tested to the full. The fire which destroyed the Hotel Hydropathic was apparently caused by an electrical fault started in the roof space.

In consequence, the fire was almost out of control before the fire brigade was in attendance, although they turned out very quickly. In fighting the fire they were hampered by a lack of water-pressure, the sheer size of the Hydro building and the shortage of hoses which would have been required for such a situation.

Despite assistance from other brigades, the fire literally burned itself out. All this was duly minuted along with the thanks conveyed to Peebles Fire Brigade for their efforts."

The cast of the 1970 film Tam Lin including its star Ava Gardner, and cast members Joanna Lumley and Stephanie Beecham stayed in the hotel while filming on location at Traquair House.

It was taken over by Crieff Hydro in February 2014.

== Treatments and regime ==
When it first opened, the following baths and treatments were offered: Russian, Turkish, peat, Nauheim, aromatic, medicated, eucalyptus, rain, pine extract, spray, vapour, brine or sulphur baths. Many associated treatments were available: vibration-massage, the Oertel or Terrain cure, the sun and air bath, a nebular, Metchnikoff's sour milk treatment, the Johann Schroth diet, the grape cure, the Salisbury system, a high-protein weight loss diet using Salisbury Steak or the Koumiss cure. As at Crieff Hydro there were outdoor recreations, from otter hunting to tennis, shooting, croquet and cycling, and a wide range of activities for inclement weather and the evenings. Guests were encouraged to bring their musical instruments.
