= Ernst Brand =

German physician (1827–1897)

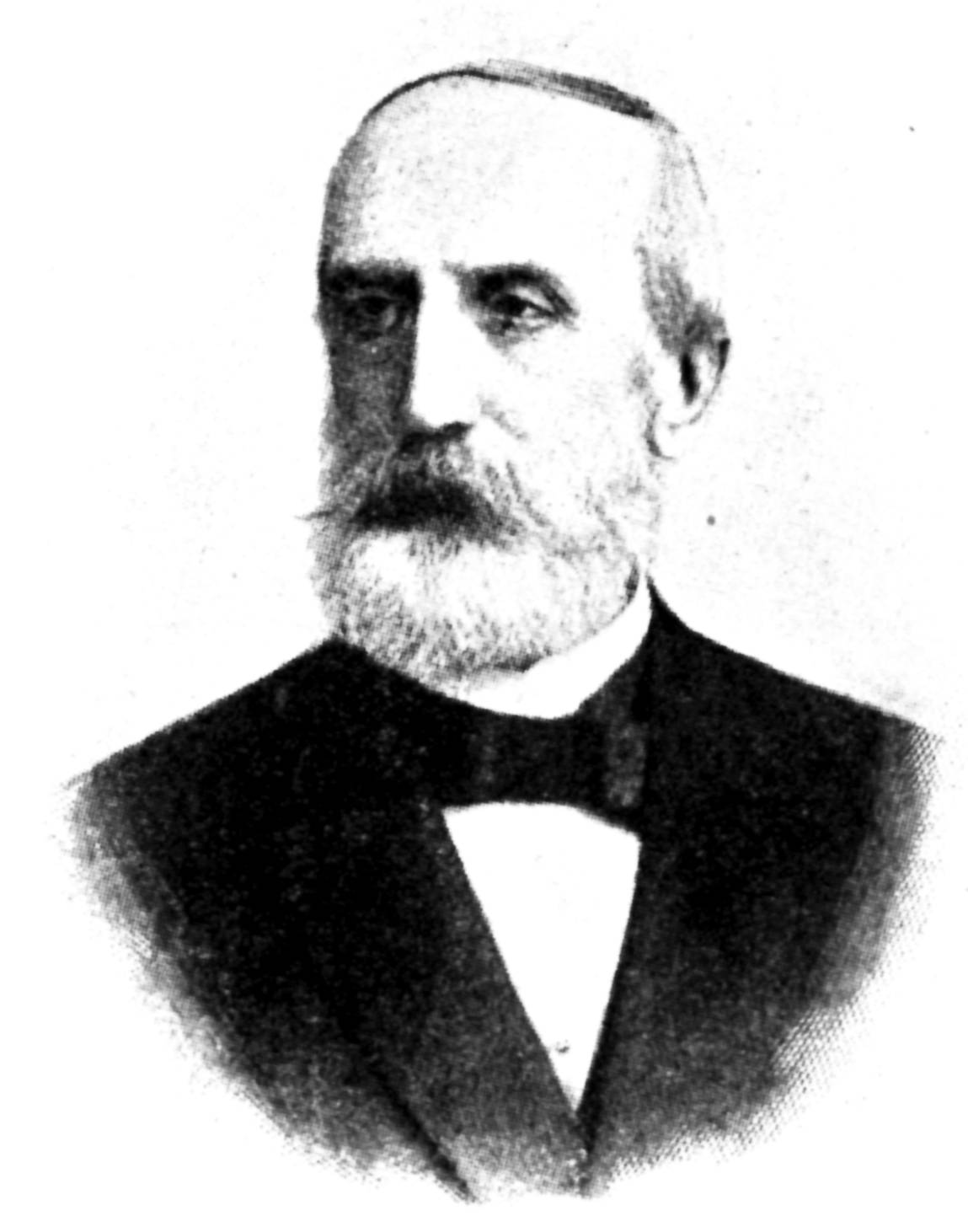
Ernst Brand

Ernst Brand (2 January 1827 in Feuchtwangen – 7 March 1897 in Stettin) was a German physician, known for his development of hydrotherapy (cold bath treatment) in the treatment of typhoid fever.

From 1845 to 1851 he studied medicine at the University of Erlangen, during which time he worked as a clinical assistant to Karl Friedrich Canstatt. In 1851 he received his doctorate with a dissertation-thesis on pyloric stenosis, and following graduation he undertook a study trip to Vienna, Paris and London. After completing the Prussian state exam he settled into a medical practice in Stettin.

== Associated eponym ==
- "Brand method": For the treatment of typhoid fever. A regimen of giving baths in water at room temperature or lower every three hours. Process continued for as long as the rectal temperature is greater than 103°.

== Published works ==
- Über Diabetes, 1849 – On diabetes.
- Die Stenose des Pylorus vom pathologisch- anatomischen Standpunkte aus geschildert (dissertation), 1851 – The stenosis of the pylorus from a pathological point of view.
- Die Hydrotherapie des Typhus, 1861 – Hydrotherapy for typhus.
- Zur Hydrotherapie des Typhus, Bericht über in St Petersburg, Stettin und Luxemburg hydriatrisch behandelte Fälle, 1863 – On hydrotherapy for typhus. Report on Saint Petersburg, Stettin and Luxembourg hydriatic-treated cases.
- Die Heilung des Typhus, 1868 – Healing therapy for typhus.
- Die Wasserbehandlung der typhösen Fieber, Abdominal- und Flecktyphus, 1877 – Water treatment of typhoid fever (abdominal and typhus).
