= Frederick Walter Simms =

British civil engineer (1803–1865)

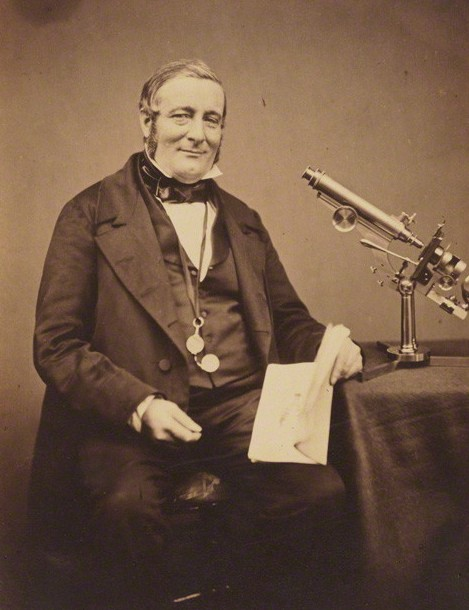
- Born: 24 December 1803; London, UK
- Died: 27 February 1865 (aged 61); London, UK
- Engineering career
- Institutions: Geological Society; Institution of Civil Engineers; Royal Astronomical Society

Frederick Walter Simms (24 December 1803 – 27 February 1865) was a British civil engineer.

== Biography ==
Born on 24 December 1803, in London, Simms suffered from ill-health in his younger years (as his obituary put it, he was "of delicate constitution", and some difficulty was encountered in finding him suitable employment until via the influence of his brother he was despatched to Ireland as an assistant to the Ordnance Survey.

After leaving Ireland, Simms became an astronomical assistant at the Royal Observatory, Greenwich, under John Pond. He resigned his post on 31 October 1835, apparently having hoped to be awarded the post of First Assistant, for which he was "quite incompetent" in the words of Sir George Biddell Airy. He returned to his former occupation as a surveyor and civil engineer, visiting France with Richard Tappin Claridge, who in the 1830s patented the use of Seyssel asphalt in the UK, and later working with Claridge on the introduction of asphalt to Britain. The formation in 1838 of Claridge's Patent Asphalte Company (which ceased operating in 1917) "gave an enormous impetus to the development of a British asphalt industry". Simms' own efforts included writing a pamphlet promoting the use of Seyssel asphalt, based on an 1836 paper by geologist M. Rozet.

In 1836, Simms joined the South Eastern Railway Company as a resident engineer and undertook a considerable number of works, including the construction of the Bletchingley and Saltwood tunnels.

In 1846, the East India Company, having decided to construct railways in their territories, proposed to Simms that he become their consulting engineer in India. His health suffered from the climate and he spend some time in Mauritius before returning to duty where, among other work, he supervised a complete survey and mapping of the city of Calcutta which was principally carried out by local assistants.

Having completed his engagement with the East India Company, Simms returned to England in 1851, his health very much affected by India's climate and thereafter lived in retirement. He died on 27 February 1865, aged 61, in London.

== Bibliography ==
- A Treatise on the Principles and Practice of Levelling. London: J. Weale. 1837.
- Simms, F.W (1837). Practical observations on the asphaltic cement or mastic of Seyssel, now extensively employed on the continent for pavements, roofing and flooring of hydraulic works, etc. London. (cited in Forbes 1958, p. 21).
- Practical Tunneling. London: Troughton and Simms. 1844.
- A Treatise on the Principal Mathematical Instruments Employed in Surveying, Levelling and Astronomy. London: Troughton and Simms. 1844.
- England to Calcutta by the Overland Route, in 1845. London: Harrison and Sons. 1878.
