= Priessnitz (band) =

Czech rock band

- Origin: Jeseník, Czechoslovakia
- Genres: Rock
- Years active: 1989–2017
- Past members: Jaromír Švejdík; Petr Kružík; Libor Halíček; Ladislav Kolompár; Miroslav Brzobohatý; Dušan Oravec; Petr Víša; Zdeněk Jurčík; Lukáš Morávek
- Website: priessnitz.com

Priessnitz was a Czech rock band from Jeseník formed in 1989 as Chlapi z práce by singer Jaromír Švejdík and guitarist Petr Kružík. Throughout their career, they released eight studio albums and one live record, with the most recent one, Beztíže, coming out in 2016. The band received a nomination at the 2016 Apollo Awards and two at the Anděl Awards. That year, Czech Television made a feature film about them. Priessnitz broke up in 2017.

== History ==
In the late 1980s, singer Jaromír Švejdík and guitarist Petr Kružík played in the punk rock band Chlapi z práce, which became Priessnitz in 1989, named after the Austrian hydrotherapist Vincenz Priessnitz. It initially consisted of Švejdík, Kružík, bassist Libor Halíček, and drummer Ladislav Kolompár, with frequent collaborator Jiří Vaculík on second guitar. They released their debut studio album, Freiwaldau, in 1992, following it with Nebel later the same year.

In 1994, Priessnitz issued their third record, Hexe. Halíček left and was replaced by Miroslav Brzobohatý, who had played with Švejdík and Kružík in Chlapi z práce. The band also added second guitarist Dušan Oravec. Their next record, Seance, came out in 1996 and included a string section. Potichu?, an acoustic collection of previously released tracks and two new ones, followed in 1997. At this point, Priessnitz swapped out bassists once more, losing Brzobohatý and taking on Petr Víša in his place. Their next album, titled Zero, was published in 2001. Oravec left in 2002.

In 2004, the band released their first live recording, titled Playlist, which includes a contribution from Jaroslav Rudiš. They followed it with the studio album Stereo in 2006, which included their new drummer, Zdeněk Jurčík. During this period, Švejdík founded the side projects Umakart (2004) and Jaromir 99 & the Bombers (2007), while also working as an illustrator on a comic book series with Rudiš, which was made into an animated feature film in 2011, titled Alois Nebel. The film's music was composed by Petr Kružík, and the band toured to promote it. In 2013, they added Lukáš Morávek on trumpet, keyboards, and backing vocals, and in 2016, they issued the album Beztíže, which included contributions from former guitarist Dušan Oravec. It was nominated for the Apollo Prize as album of the year, the song "Mrzáci" got a nomination at the Anděl Awards, and Priessnitz were nominated as band of the year. Additionally, Czech Television made a film about the band. Priessnitz ceased activity in 2017.

== Band members ==
- Jaromír Švejdík – vocals (1989–2017)
- Petr Kružík – guitar (1989–2017)
- Libor Halíček – bass (1989–1994)
- Ladislav Kolompár – drums (1989–2006)
- Miroslav Brzobohatý – bass (1994–1997)
- Dušan Oravec – guitar (1994–2002)
- Petr Víša – bass (1997–2017)
- Zdeněk Jurčík – drums (2006–2017)
- Lukáš Morávek – trumpet, keyboards, vocals (2013–2017)

== Discography ==
- Freiwaldau (1992)
- Nebel (1992)
- Hexe (1994)
- Seance (1996)
- Potichu? (1997)
- Zero (2001)
- Zorro zero.rmxs (2002)
- Playlist (live, 2004)
- Stereo (2006)
- Beztíže (2016)
