= Vincenz Priessnitz =

Austrian hydrotherapist (1799–1851)

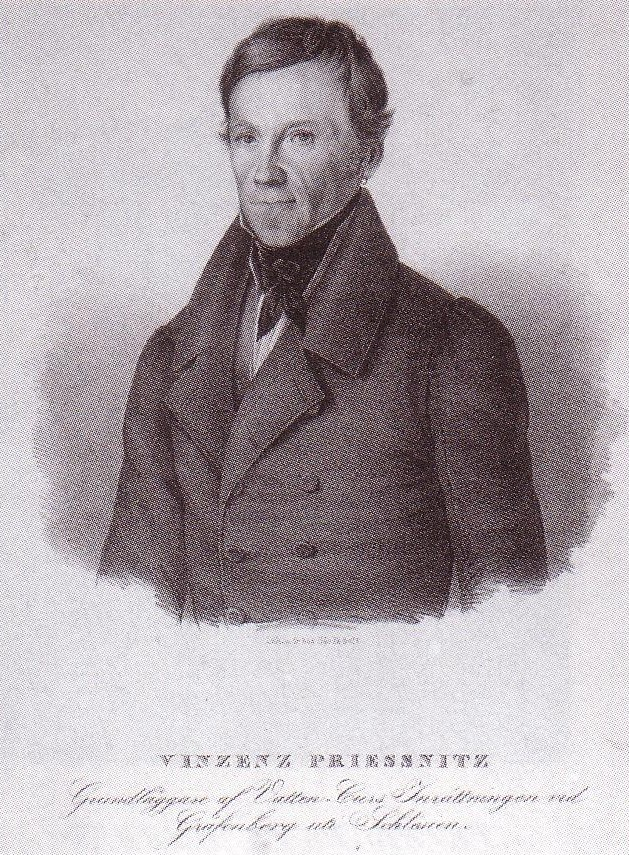
Vincenz Priessnitz

Vincenz Priessnitz, also written Prießnitz (sometimes in German Vinzenz, in English Vincent, in Czech Vincenc; 4 October 1799 – 26 November 1851) was an Austrian hydrotherapist. Originally a peasant farmer in Austrian Silesia, he is generally considered the founder of hydrotherapy, an alternative medical treatment.

Priessnitz stressed remedies such as vegetarian food, air, exercise, rest, water, and traditional medicine. He is thus also credited with laying the foundations of what became known as the Nature Cure, although it has been noted that his main focus was on hydrotherapeutic techniques. The use of cold water as a curative is recorded in the works of Hippocrates and Galen, and techniques such as spas, bathing, and drinking were used by various physicians in Europe and the US through to the 18th century. The practice was becoming less prevalent entering the 19th century however, until Priessnitz revived the technique after having major success applying it on patients in his spa in Gräfenberg (now Lázně Jeseník). Priessnitz's name first became widely known in the English-speaking world through the publications and lecture tours of Captain R. T. Claridge in 1842 and 1843, after he had stayed at Gräfenberg in 1841. However, Priessnitz was already a household name on the European continent, where Richard Metcalfe, in his 1898 biography, stated: "there are hundreds of establishments where the water-cure is carried out on the principles laid down by Priessnitz". Indeed, Priessnitz's fame became so widespread that his death was reported as far away as New Zealand.

== Biography ==
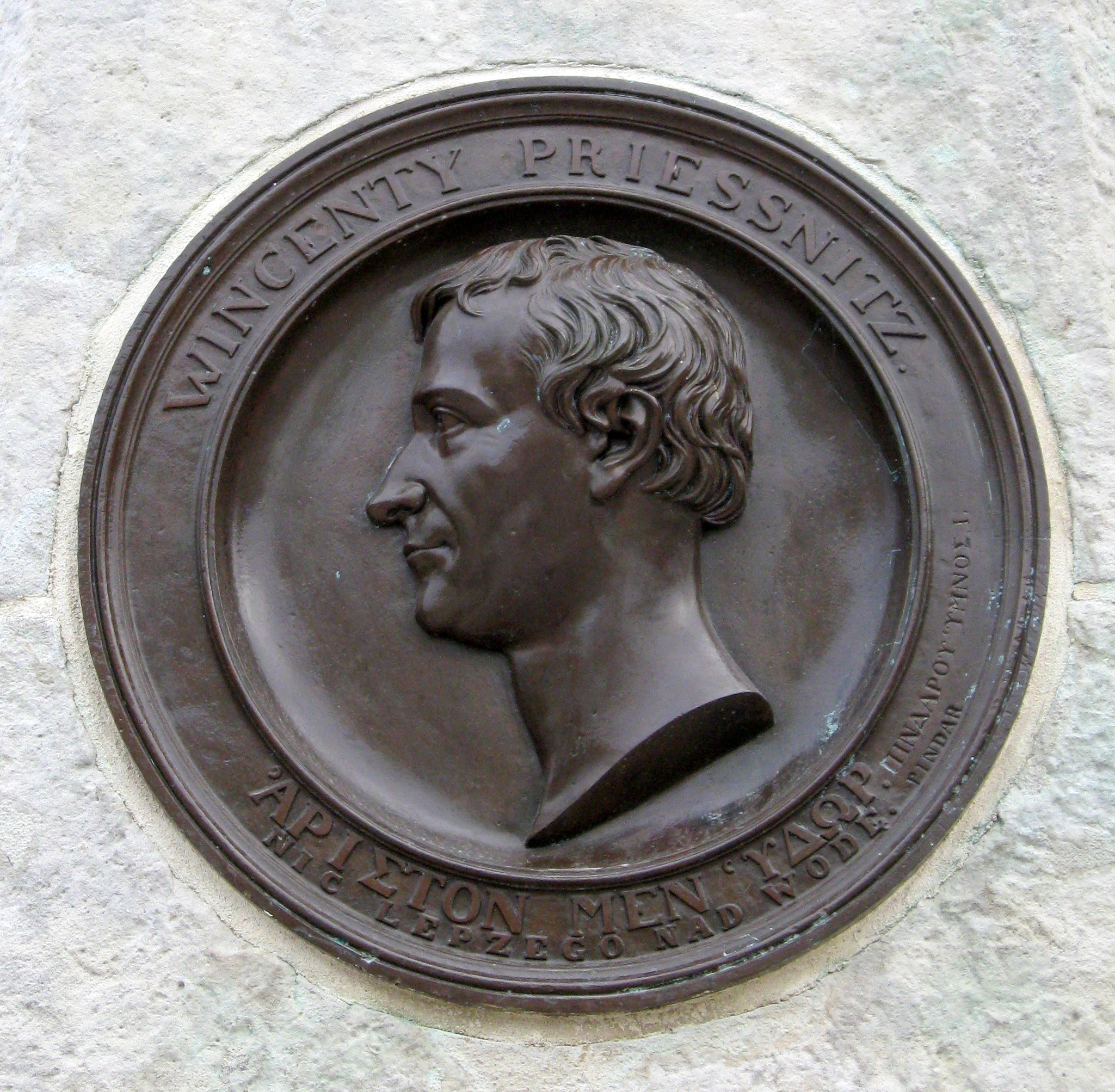
Plaque in Poznań, funded by Edward Raczyński in 1841

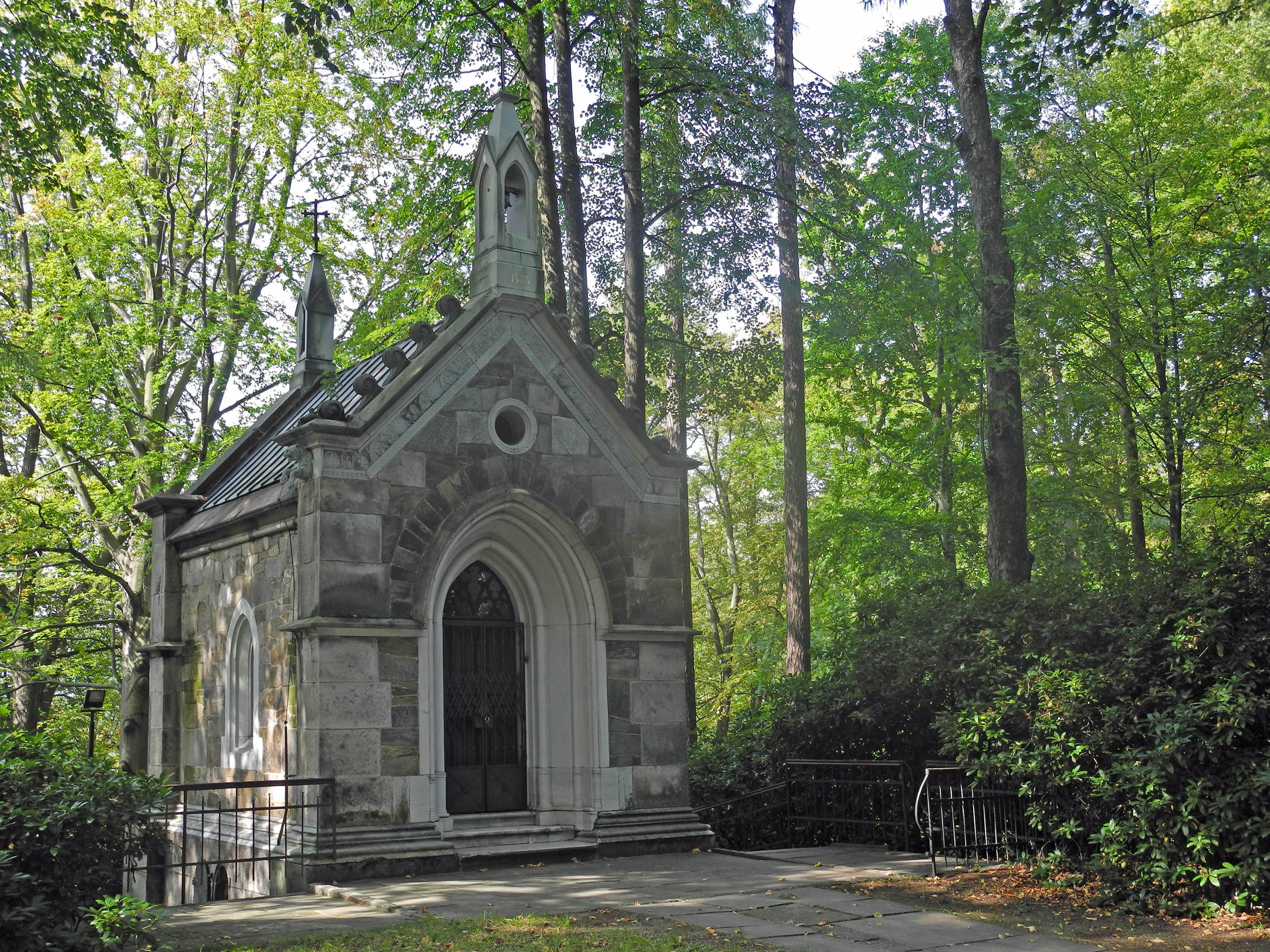
Chapel on the Vincenz Priessnitz vault, Kopa Hill, Jeseník

=== Early life ===
Vincenz Priessnitz was born into a farmer's family in the village of Gräfenberg in Austrian Silesia (today an integral part of Jeseník, Czech Republic) and baptized Vincenz Franz. His parents were among the first settlers of the village. When Vincenz was eight his father went blind and he had to help in the farm, especially after his elder brother died four years later. Once Vincenz watched a roebuck with a wounded limb coming to a pond (or stream) to heal its wound. He healed his own finger injured during timber felling with water wraps in 1814. He also relieved pain after spraining his wrist by applying wet bandages, which lessened the inflammation.

In 1816 he was injured more seriously when he broke his ribs in an accident with a cart and the doctor claimed it was fatal or at least crippling. Priessnitz refused to accept the doctor's diagnosis, and over the next year, he healed after applying wet bandages to his chest and drinking large quantities of water. His recovery strengthened his conviction in the practice, and brought him local fame. Priessnitz began healing animals on his farm and in his village, and later began developing techniques and protocols for healing people. Different types of baths focused on healing different body parts and various afflictions, including paralysis, insanity and poisoning. Soon queues of people were coming to Gräfenberg, so in 1822 Vincenz decided to rebuild his father's house, building part of it as a sanatorium and spa for his patients.

=== Practice at Gräfenberg ===
As Priessnitz's experience grew, the procedures of his treatments became more precise and regular. To treat many diseases, he would wrap the patient in wet bandages and many layers of blankets to cause heavy perspiration from the heat. After several hours, the patient was then instructed to bathe in cold water, and also drink plenty of water. He believed that the rapid changes in temperature allowed the pores of the skin to open and evacuate bad substances in the blood. Another theory Priessnitz held was that the body tended towards health naturally. His treatments, which involved no drugs or herbal medicines, were designed then to help the body remove foreign matter from the body. The extreme conditions disturbs this matter, which prompts a bodily response. Priessnitz also required his patients to add strenuous exercise to their daily regimen, and sometimes required his patients to fast. The food served was bland and hard, and water was the only drink served. Cold water was sometimes added to the food to promote water intake, and patients were required to drink twelve glasses of water per day at a minimum, with some drinking as many as thirty glasses.

Before Priessnitz's spa was built near his family house, Priessnitz mostly made house calls. As his popularity grew, Priessnitz limited his practice to his residence, and began expanding the Gräfenberg spa with lodgings, dining rooms, showers and bathhouses. Some patients lived in the spa for up to four years. He constructed several douches, which were heavy showers of cold water that flowed from nearby mountains. The water from these douches fell from up to 20 feet in the air, with a stream so strong that new patients were sometimes "flattened by the force of the stream." Other baths were created for different body parts, such as eye baths, foot baths and head baths.

In 1826 he was invited to Vienna to heal the Emperor's brother Anton Victor, Grand Master of the Teutonic Knights. This bolstered his reputation and led to many people from all over the country streaming into Gräfenberg.

=== Opponents and controversy ===
His "sponge washing" was not accepted by local doctors who accused him of being an impostor with no medical background. These early opponents brought Priessnitz to court several times, but he was acquitted each time, and inspections of his spa confirmed that water was the sole healing agent used in the facility. In 1838 Priessnitz was granted a permit to establish the spa he founded several years earlier. These high-profile cases only served to expand his fame throughout Europe. As hydrotherapy became more widely accepted, his opponents became more concerned with his exact methods than the overall practice, finding Priessnitz's treatments far too extreme and taxing on the body. The food offered at the spa was also notoriously bad-tasting and unhealthy. One visitor complained about being served "veal 10 days old." Dr. Robert Hay Graham, who visited the Gräfenberg spa in October 1842, noted that Priessnitz did not keep any records of his patients, and that his practice was based on hunch and experience over any systematic approach. Graham suggested that Priessnitz's treatment worked on one out of twenty people at best, and that a milder water-cure that was combined with other medicines would be preferable.

=== Success ===
In 1839, 1500 patients arrived (among them one monarch, a duke and duchess, 22 princes and 149 counts and countesses) and 120 doctors to study the new therapy. A visit by Archduke Franz Carl in October 1845 was greeted with an address extolling the virtues of Priessnitz and his methods, signed by 124 guests, from a variety of countries. The new spa house, built that year with 30 rooms, was called Castle and the next house was called New Spa House. In 1846 Priessnitz was awarded a medal by the Emperor. Various aristocratic patients did him reverence by erecting monuments in the spa town. Among the most famous guests was Nikolai Gogol who visited the spa twice in 1839 and 1846.

In 1842, R. T. Claridge published The Cold Water Cure, its Principles, Theory, and Practice, which detailed Priessnitz's treatments. Claridge was himself a patient of Priessnitz, and his book's descriptions contain notes on the process of his own treatment at the spa, and the effectiveness of Priessnitz's treatments on other patients with various diseases.

Priessnitz's practice spread to the U.S. soon after becoming established in Europe, and several hydropathic medical schools and medical journals were created in the U.S. Some practitioners performed scientific experiments on the effects of known water-cures, and they developed new methods and theories about the field. The usage of extreme temperature was toned down to account for differences in patients' age and condition. One notable theory that emerged was that osmosis contributed to the healing effects of water. The skin was thought to act as a membrane, and impurities in the body would flow out into pure water applied by bandages and baths.

Priessnitz's English biographer, Richard Metcalfe, notes that despite the fame of the Graefenberg setting, Priessnitz believed that the water-cure treatment was what provided his patients relief, not the locale.

That Priessnitz was of this opinion appears from the fact that after his fame had spread throughout Europe, and people came to Graefenberg from all quarters, he did not confine his practice of hydropathy to that healthy region, but visited and treated patients at their own homes in towns, where similar success attended his manipulations.

There are some who would stultify Priessnitz by making his saying, "Man muss Gebirge haben" (One must have mountains), to mean that he considered a mountainous region indispensable to the successful practice of hydropathy. But, as the facts stated above show, the whole career of Priessnitz gives the lie to such a notion.

=== Death ===
Vincenz Priessnitz died in 1851. Newspapers of the day reported that on the morning of his death "Priessnitz was up, and stirring about at an early hour and complaining of the cold, and had wood brought in to make a large fire. His friends had for some time believed him to be suffering from dropsy in the chest, and at their earnest entreaty he consented to take a little medicine, exclaiming all the while, 'it is no use.' He would see no physician, but remained to the last true to his profession". At about four o'clock in the afternoon, "he asked to be carried to bed, and upon being laid down he expired. Priessnitz's wife Sofie died in 1854, and was buried in the family crypt in Gräfenberg, where Priessnitz also lay. They had nine children, comprising eight daughters and one son. The son, Vincent Paul Priessnitz, was born on 22 June 1847, and died on 30 June 1884, aged 37.^{[a]}

Children and children-in-law of Vincenz Priessnitz

== Legacy ==
The Museum of Vincenz Priessnitz is in the house which was the seat of the first hydrotherapy institute in Lázně Jeseník.

There is a statue of Priessnitz in Vienna (1911), in Kirchheim unter Teck and a Priessnitz fountain by Carl Konrad Albert Wolff in Poznań, Poland

The 200th anniversary of his birth was listed among the UNESCO anniversaries in 1999.

A band from Jeseník named itself Priessnitz.

A Czech movie based on his life was made in 1999 under the name of Vincenz Priessnitz.

Knowledge of Priessnitz's work in Britain led to the foundation of twenty hydropathic establishments. Of these, two remain one in Peebles, the other Crieff Hydro, Crieff.

In the Polish language, Priessnitz is the eponym for the word for shower, prysznic.

== In literature ==
In The Confidence-Man by Herman Melville, the herb-doctor says, '"The water-cure? Oh, fatal delusion of the well-meaning Preisnitz!"

== Notes ==
a. Metcalfe's earlier essay on Priessnitz, while comprising a readily digestible summary of his life and work, is best reviewed in conjunction with other works, including Metcalfe's own later book on Priessnitz. For example, in Metcalfe's 1869 essay, he describes Priessnitz's eldest son as having died at an apparently young age. However, there is no mention of this in Metcalfe's better researched 1898 book, which not only provides a picture of Priessnitz's adult son (per this article), but in which the son is stated as being born in 1847 and having died in 1884. This is also consistent with the tribute website that gives the same birth and death dates, and which states the son's age at death as being 37.
