= Šumperk–Krnov railway =

Railway in the Czech Republic

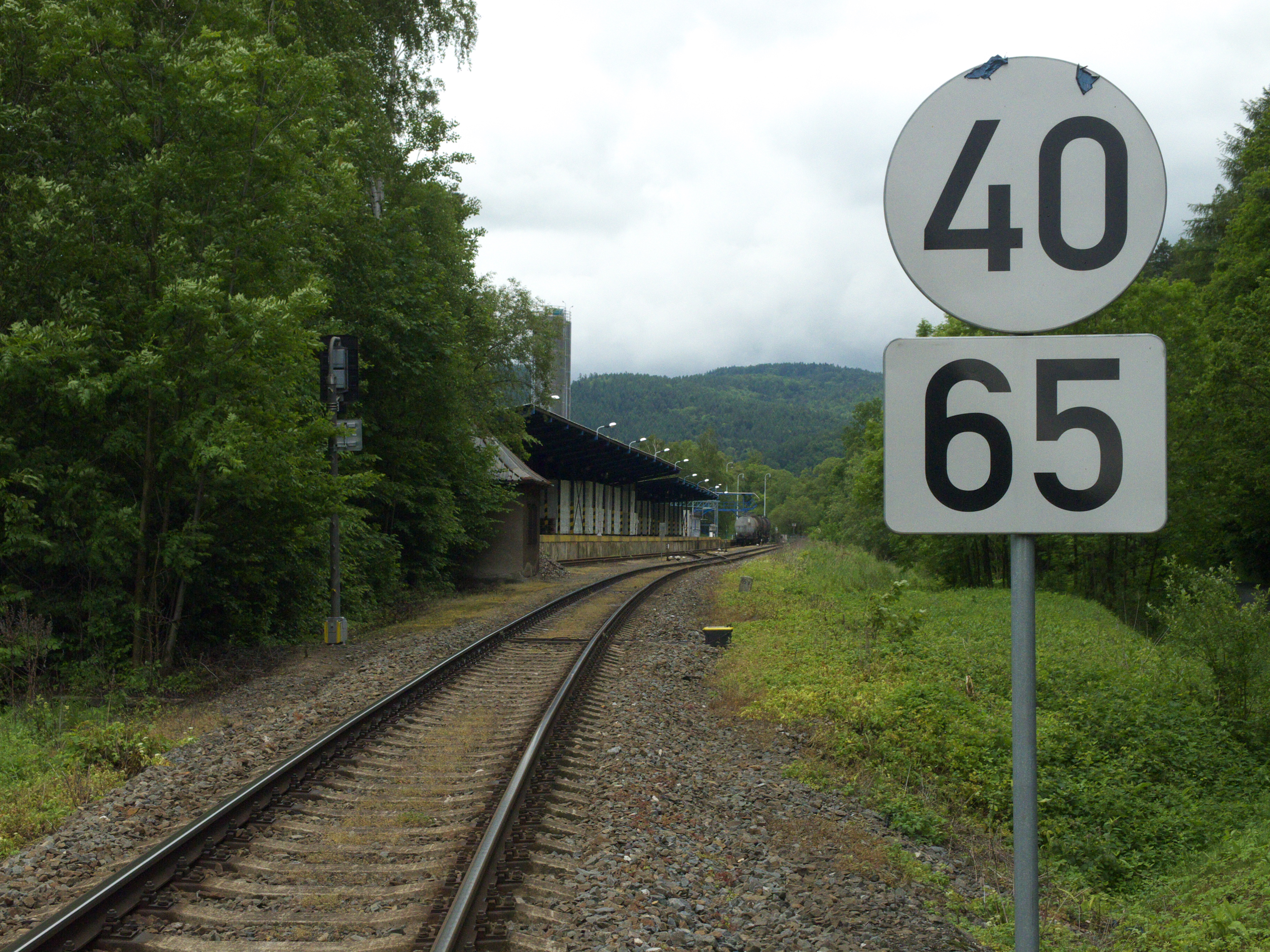
The freight station Olšany

The Šumperk–Krnov railway line links Šumperk to Krnov through mountains of Eastern Sudetes with highest point in Ramzovské sedlo pass. The length is 123 kilometres (76 mi), the track gauge 1435 mm, the highest track gradient is 33‰, the maximum speed is 80 kilometres per hour (50 mph).

The section Głuchołazy - Pokrzywna is situated in Poland and operated by PKP PLK. Infrastructure operator for the Czech part is Správa železnic. The section Bludov - Šumperk is electrified, the section Hanušovice - Horní Lipová is situated in hilly terrain, hence it has got nickname Silesia Semmering. The Museum of Silesia Semmering is situated in train station Horní Lipová - lázně.

== See also ==
- Krnov–Głuchołazy railway
