= R. T. Claridge =

British contractor

Captain Richard Tappin Claridge, FSA (c. 1797/1799^{[a]} – 5 August 1857), was a prominent asphalt contractor and captain in the Middlesex UK Militia, who became best known for his prominent promotion of hydropathy, now known as hydrotherapy, in the 1840s. It was also known as the Cold Water system or Cold Water cure.^{[b]} Claridge is widely credited with introducing the methods of Vincent Priessnitz to England, thus initiating the populist movement of the time.^{[c]} Indeed, much of what is popularly known about Priessnitz in the English-speaking world comes from two seminal publications. Firstly, Claridge's Hydropathy; or The Cold Water Cure, as practised by Vincent Priessnitz... (1842 & 1843). Secondly, Richard Metcalfe's Life of Vincent Priessnitz (1898), with Metcalfe himself drawing upon Claridge, although Metcalfe also later wrote a historical overview and added more about Claridge and his role in the promotion of hydropathy.

== Biographical synopsis ==
Richard Tappin Claridge was born in Farnborough, a village or parish in the county of Warwickshire, and administered by the Stratford-on-Avon District Council. Claridge, a member of the Arcadian Academy at Rome, was the elder and only surviving son of James and Hannah Claridge, and a descendant of church minister and subsequent Quaker, Richard Claridge. Rev. James Claridge was himself a curate in the Established, or Episcopal Church. The Rev. James Claridge died by accident, leaving Richard an orphan at age eight.

Claridge married twice. On 28 June 1822, at St George's, Hanover Square, he married Elizabeth Ann Aldsworth Green, who was the only child of the late William Green, of Bolton Street, Piccadilly, and of Kew, Surrey. In April 1824 they had a daughter named Emma Green, who later married Marie Etienne Charles Henri, Marquis de St. Aignan, and subsequently resided in Nice. Claridge was a man of independent means, who in 1841 attended Priessnitz's establishment at Graefenberg along with his wife and daughter. He claimed that his promotion of hydropathy was "completely philanthropic. Having gained my own health and saved the life of my daughter at Graefenberg, and having witnessed most astounding cures there", he wanted to promote this system. Elizabeth died on 24 August 1842. Claridge spent some time in Italy, from where around 1847 he continued promoting hydropathy by petition and a letter written at Bagni de Lucco on 12 May 1847. On 7 January 1854, Claridge, now residing at a villa on the left bank of Paillon in Nice, married his second wife, Eliza Ann Morgan (née Beville) at Trinity Church, Marylebone. Eliza had herself been previously married to the late George Gould Morgan, of the Tredegar peerage. Eliza Morgan Claridge died sometime before 1866.

Before his prominence as a hydropathy promoter, Claridge tried his hand in other fields: with which, indeed, some critics alluded he should have stuck.^{[d]} This included a partnership as a boot and shoe-maker, with the partnership dissolving on 7 February 1824. And as a wine merchant, through at least May 1824 to August 1825, and where early on, he found himself as a potential creditor of a bankrupt. At this time, Claridge resided at 37 Wigmore Street, Marylebone. Claridge himself was declared bankrupt in 1826.

However, it was another field where Claridge first became prominent, namely that of pioneering the use of asphalt paving in the United Kingdom, which he embarked on after returning from a tour of Europe in 1836. He also served with the Middlesex Militia, attaining the rank of captain, before resigning in 1854. At the end of his life, Claridge was still living in Nice and died in Castellammare di Stabia on 5 August 1857, and a copy of his will is held at The National Archives, Kew. At least one portrait of Claridge is known to have been created, by painter James John Hill. It was exhibited in 1844 at the Royal Society of British Artists, at Suffolk Street, Pall Mall, and titled Portrait of Captain Claridge, Author of Hydropathy, or the Cold-Water Cure.^{[e]}

== Before hydropathy ==
In 1836, prior to his involvement in the promotion of hydropathy, Claridge journeyed through Europe, making notes along the way, from which he published his first known work in 1837, titled A Guide Along the Danube..., for which he wrote the preface on 1 May 1837, at Venice. This was a tour guide for travel down the Danube, made possible by recent socio-political developments and "the establishment of steam navigation throughout the entire length of the Danube, the Black Sea, the Bosphorous, the Arhipeligo, and the Adriatic", which "converted what was hitherto a journey of toil and danger into one of unmixed pleasure and enjoyment".

On 10 June 1837, Bent's Monthly Literary Advertiser carried a brief advertisement announcing the pending release of the book by "Richard T. Claridge, Esq.", with the announcement comprising the book's lengthy title, and noting "Observations on the recent political and social changes in Turkey and Greece." A second edition, with numerous additions, was published in 1839, which Claridge states was prompted by "very favourable reception" of the first edition. One review described it as appearing to convey, "in a concise manner, the necessary directions for a traveller to make a very interesting and instructive tour at the least possible expenditure of both time and money". The second edition incorporated a range of new material, including:

in addition to the voyage down the Danube, and the tour of Constantinople, Asia Minor, Greece, Italy, &c., the route from Paris to the Mediterranean, via Marseilles and Malta – the route from Paris to Ancona, via Geneva and Milan – the routes from Paris to Munich, via Nancy, Strasbourg, Badenbaden; and via Metz and Frankfort – the route from Munich to Venice and Trieste, via the Tyrol – the routes from London to the Rhine and the Danube – and the route from Alexandria to Cairo, &c., on the way to India.

In these publications, Claridge was not yet known as captain, a title which he only commenced using from the publication of Hydropathy in 1842 onwards. In 1839, Claridge was promoted from Gentleman to Lieutenant in the Royal Westminster Middlesex Regiment of Militia, then in 1842 he was promoted to captain, before eventually resigning on 24 June 1854. In the meantime, between his 1836 tour of the European Continent, and his hydropathic adventures from the 1840s onwards, Claridge embarked on some pioneering business ventures in asphalt pavement, obtaining some patents, and setting up a company.

== Claridge's Patent Asphalte Company ==
=== Claridge's patents ===
The first asphalt patent in Britain was 'Cassell's patent asphalte or bitumen' in 1834, and there was an unsuccessful attempt to use mastic pavement at Vauxhall by a competitor of Claridge. But it was Claridge's efforts that were to give the industry impetus. In France, Seyssel asphalt was being successfully implemented for paving by Count de Sassenay. On 25 November 1837, Richard Tappin Claridge (then a "Salisbury Street, gentleman") patented Seyssel asphalt (patent #7849) for use in pavements in Britain, where he managed Sassenay's affairs, Claridge had seen Seyssel asphalt employed in France and Belgium when visiting with Frederick Walter Simms, who worked with him on the introduction of asphalt to Britain. In 1838, Claridge (listed as a gent of 8 Regent St., Middlesex) obtained patents in Scotland on 27 March, and Ireland on 23 April. In 1847, Claridge sold his interest in the patents to the trustees of his company, who in 1851 sought to extend the duration of all three patents, although unsuccessfully.

Apart from the asphalt patents, on 26 April 1842, a six-month patent was granted for a composition called "oropholithe" to Claridge and two others, namely Richard Hodgson, and Raoul Armand Joseph Jean Comte de la Chatre (patent #9331). This was a composition used "in preparing fabrics for covering floors, roofs, and other surfaces", which involved coating the fabric on one side for dry applications, or both sides "for roofs and other surfaces exposed to wet and damp". At time of this patent, Claridge was described as living at Weymouth Street, in the County of Middlesex.

=== Formation and growth of Claridge's company ===
Claridge's Patent Asphalte Company was formed for the purpose of introducing to Britain "Asphalte in its natural state from the mine at Pyrimont Seysell in France", and "laid one of the first asphalt pavements in Whitehall". Trials were made of the pavement in 1838 on the footway in Whitehall, the stable at Knightsbridge Barracks, "and subsequently on the space at the bottom of the steps leading from Waterloo Place to St. James Park". "The formation in 1838 of Claridge's Patent Asphalte Company (with a distinguished list of aristocratic patrons, and Marc and Isambard Brunel as, respectively, a trustee and consulting engineer), gave an enormous impetus to the development of a British asphalt industry". Per response to a query on Claridge, "in 1839, the offices of the company were at Stangate, Westminster, as appears in an advertisement in the Athenaeum of 4 May 1838, p.342".

Although asphalt use took off in the 1830s, The Mechanics' Magazine noted the existence of a pamphlet from 1621, by "a certain Monsieur d'Eyrinys" stating he had discovered large quantities of asphaltum in the vicinity of Neufchâtel, and that prior to his discovery, asphaltum was only known to exist in the Dead Sea. Mechanics Magazine added "we wonder, by-the-bye, no 'Dead Sea Asphalt Company' has yet made its appearance in the market", and wondering whether the lack of such a market take-off in two centuries hinted at limitations of the product. Nevertheless, "By the end of 1838, at least two other companies, Robinson's and the Bastenne company, were in production". Indeed, in 1838, there was a flurry of entrepreneurial activity over asphalt, which had uses beyond paving. For example, asphalt could also be used for flooring, damp proofing in buildings, and for waterproofing of various types of pools and baths, with these latter themselves proliferating in the 1800s. On the London stockmarket, there were various claims as to the exclusivity of asphalt quality from France, Germany and England. And numerous patents were granted in France, with similar numbers of patent applications being denied in England due to their similarity to each other. In England, "Claridge's was the type most used in the 1840s and 50s", including in such uses as school flooring. In 1847, Claridge's company promoted itself as producing "the only impervious and permanent covering for arches and roofs, and lining of reservoirs, gutters, & c"

In the 1870s, Claridge's company took over asphalt production at Pyrimont Wharf, in Cubitt Town. "The manufacturing process employed at Cubitt Town involved the heating of bituminous limestone in six large uncovered cauldrons, producing vapours considered offensive by many local residents. The material was employed predominantly for covering and protecting the foundations of buildings. It was employed, for example, at the Tobacco Stores at the Victoria Docks."

=== Last years of Claridge's Patent Asphalte Co. ===
By 1914, Claridge's Patent Asphalte Company had many contracts in hand, including 70,000 feet of asphalte roofing at HM Stationery Office; damp courses, floors and roofs at British American Tobacco Company's warehouse and W.H. Smith & Sons new printing works. Their expanding business necessitated moving to bigger premises, with their new offices at No. 3 Central Buildings, Westminster. "They also entered another business – that of tarred slag macadam – under the title of Clarmac Roads, Ltd", with offices at the same address. Clarmac Roads was a subsidiary company promoted by Claridge's Asphalte Co to manufacture the materials and registered on 14 September 1914. With increasing motor traffic, the directors of Claridge's Asphalte Co thought there was a future for the construction of roads using the tar-bound macadam method, (now commonly known as tarmac) and invested a substantial amount of funds in the new company, borrowing money to do so. Two products resulted, namely Clarmac, and Clarphalte, with the former being manufactured by Clarmac Roads and the latter by Claridge's Patent Asphalte Co., although Clarmac was more widely used. Scott's Lane, Beckenham; Dorset Street, Marylebone; Lordswood Road, Birmingham; Hearsall Lane, Coventry; Valkyrie Avenue, Westcliff-on-Sea; and Lennard Road, Penge were photographed as "some amongst many laid with 'Clarmac'"

In 1915, Claridge's Patent Asphalte Co. supplied asphalt for the Strand offices of the Government of the Dominion of New Zealand. In July 1915, Clarmac Roads was in financial difficulties owing to the First World War, and the Claridge Company directors, believing those difficulties to be temporary, deposited a large amount of debentures with the Clarmac Company's bankers to secure an overdraft. However, the Clarmac Company never recovered. On 16 October 1915, a decision was made to wind up Clarmac Roads and a liquidator duly appointed, and creditor's meeting called. In January 1916, R.T. Wilkinson retired from his position as a director of Claridge's Company, after an association of 63 years. The failure of Clarmac Roads had a flow-on effect to Claridge's Patent Asphalte Company, with a petition to wind it up lodged with the High Court on 2 November 1917 by company director William Allback. Claridge's Patent Asphalte Company finally ceased operating on 10 November 1917, after becoming insolvent following the failure of the joint venture entered into in 1914. The sequel to this was legal action by the liquidator to recover lost funds from Allback, who had played a prominent role in the promotion of Clarmac Roads and investment of funds therein. This case itself is sometimes cited in corporate law, as an early example of exemption from legal liability where the directors of a company sought and obtained legal advice in good faith.^{[f]}

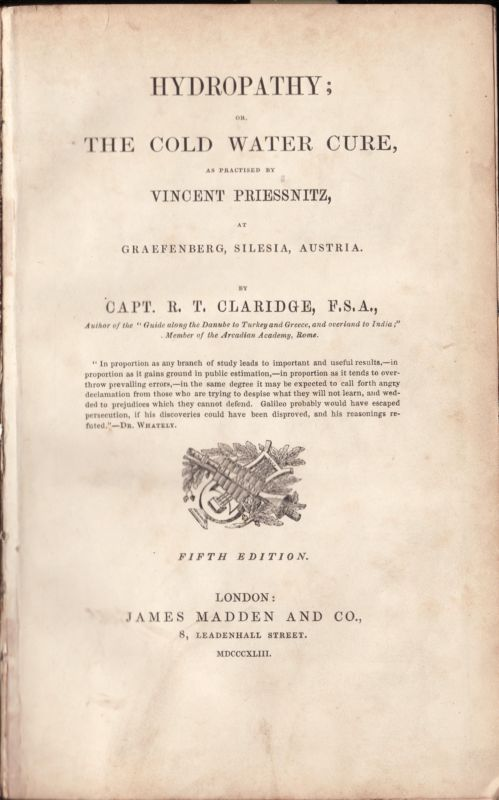
Claridge's Hydropathy book

== Hydropathy and beyond ==
Claridge wrote a number of works, but his best known, and most widely cited publication was Hydropathy; or The Cold Water Cure, as practised by Vincent Priessnitz.... The work itself provides an indication of impact and popularity of hydropathy at the time. It was first published in 1842, with the preface to the first edition dated 21 January 1842.^{[g]} In his preface to the third edition, dated 23 May 1842, Claridge noted that the book had "excited considerable attention". It reached its third edition "in the short space of three months", and in that time, "several imperfect extracts in the form of Pamphlets" appeared, and the Hydropathic Society was formed, on 17 March 1842, "at the rooms of the Society of Arts, Adelphi".^{[h]} The fifth edition contains an advertisement (which remained in subsequent editions), stating "it is little more than nine months since the first announcement of the work appeared; and during that brief period of time, five editions, of one thousand copies each, and eight editions of an Abstract, have passed through the press; besides which, several unauthorised publications, in the form of pamphlets, extracted from the work, have been sold in great numbers". With growing popularity among the public, some favourable publications written by a few medical practitioners, and several hydropathic establishments fully operational, Claridge declared that "the year 1842 may be considered as a new era in the mode of curing disease in this country".

Claridge reports that his attention was first seriously drawn to the subject of hydropathy by an officer of marines at Venice, who "Seeing me attacked by rheumatism and head-ache, to both of which complaints I have been subject for the greater part of my life, my friend strongly advised me, in the winter of 1840, to follow his example", and go to Priessnitz's establishment at Graefenberg. This he did, but not before being confined to his bed "for nearly two months", after arriving at Florence in Rome. He stayed at Graefenberg for three months, "during which time the health of that part of my family who were subjected to the treatment was perfectly established; we acquired the habit of living more moderately, of taking more exercise, of drinking more water, and of using it more freely in external ablutions than we were accustomed to; and, I may add, that we have learned how to allay pain". During his time at Graefenberg, Claridge made notes, which would form the foundation of his 1842 Hydropathy book, from his own experiences, his observations of other patients' experiences, and of the methods employed, from his discussions with Priessnitz and other patients. He also collected statistics on patient numbers and break-down by nationality, up to the beginning of September 1841.

Claridge and his family returned to England in November 1841, and stayed at a hotel in Thames Street, until they found lodgings in Weymouth St., where, on 6 January 1842, the cook at the house was alleged to have stolen a quantity of continental lace belonging to Claridge's wife and daughter. The cook was indicted again for theft of other items on 14 February. Both cases were heard on 28 February 1842, and the cook was found not guilty.

Hydropathic applications at Graefenberg, per Claridge's Hydropathy book

.

=== Hydropathy promotion and responses ===
Following his return to England, Claridge commenced promoting hydropathy in Britain, first in London in 1842, then with lecture tours in Ireland and Scotland in 1843. His 10-week tour in Ireland included Limerick, Cork, Wexford, Dublin and Belfast, over June, July and August 1843, with two subsequent lectures in Glasgow. Claridge states "The leading papers reviewed my work favourably; my lectures in England, Ireland, and Scotland met with serious attention; and baths and wash-houses resulted from a lecture I gave in Edinburgh".

Some other Englishmen preceded Claridge to Graefenberg, although not many. One of these was Dr. James Wilson, who himself, along with Dr James Manby Gully, operated a water cure establishment at Malvern. While acknowledging in an 1843 publication that Claridge did much to promote hydrotherapy, Wilson states that "I had been a considerable time at Graefenberg", and that Claridge "came to Graefenberg some time after I had been there". Nevertheless, in an earlier 1842 publication, Wilson wrote with some praise of Claridge, stating:

I have read Mr Claridge's work on the 'Cold Water Cure', and I think I ought to notice it. As a non-professional man, it does him infinite credit; he has collected a considerable body of evidence from the works of professional as well as non-professional men, and it will always be read with interest by the advocates of this system. Such men as Mr Claridge ought not to be abused, for he could have no pocket motive in its production; all that can be said is that he is a little enthusiastic in these matters – a little enthusiasm does a great deal of good sometimes, when the motives are such as Mr Claridge's.

Similarly, Sir John E. Eardley-Wilmot, in his Tribute to Hydropathy, praised Claridge "for his strenuous exertions in the cause", to which every hydropathist "owes a deep debt of gratitude". But not everyone wrote favourably, or even kindly, about Claridge and his promotion of hydropathy. One satirical review of Claridge's Hydropathy, playing on both German and English language (e.g. bad=bath in German, but bad in English – see image of hydropathic applications at Graefenberg), summed up the enthusiastic promotion of Priessnitz's water cure thus:

it has been our good fortune, since reading Claridge on Hydropathy, to see a sick drake avail himself of the "Cold Water Cure" at the dispensary in St. James's-park. First in waddling in, he took a Fuss-Bad; then he took a Sitz-bad, and then, turning his curly tail up into the air, he took a Kopf-Bad. Lastly, he rose almost upright on his latter end, and made such a triumphant flapping with his wings, that we really expected he was going to shout "Priessnitz for ever!" But no such thing. He only cried, "Quack! Quack! Quack!^{[i]}

One of the most critical reviews was in The Lancet medical journal of March 1842, in which Claridge was accused of ignorance and plagiarism, a criticism all the worse for his indulgence in antiquarian research. Moreover, in 1843, doctor Thomas J. Graham wrote somewhat triumphantly that after returning from Graefenberg, "one of the most zealous Hydropathists in this country – a gentleman who in his common conversation speaks most contemptuously of everything but cold water as a remedy for disease", sought his advice for mouth ulcers and bronchial complaints "from which his favourite Cold Water Cure could not deliver him!." Dr Graham "prescribed for him a vegetable alternative, and was favoured thereby to cure him perfectly within six weeks". In a footnote, Graham states "This was no less of a Hydropathist than Captain Claridge".

=== Hydropathy and related movements ===
Nevertheless, Claridge and others continued their efforts, and the hydropathic movement gained considerable interest. When Hydropathy was first published in 1842, there were two prominent water-cure establishments. Ten years later, there were 24 establishments in Britain and Ireland, with many famous enough to be known simply by the owner's name. Surveying the publications on hydropathy from 1820 up to 1850, Metcalfe lists 69 authors of English works, and two Water-cure journals – one in London (from 1847) and one in America (from 1845). He also listed 136 authors of German works, 48 of French works, 43 of Latin works, and nine in other languages. Hydropathic establishments also flourished. In Europe, hydropathy was already well established at the time of Claridge's first visit: In his Hydropathy book, he listed 47 known establishments as at 1840. By October 1845, Claridge noted that "in Germany, there are at least fifty; France, Switzerland, the Tyrol, Hungary, Russia, Ireland, Scotland, all have their institutions, and England counts at least twenty, besides private individuals who are introducing it into their practice; and to show its dissemination, it is only necessary to state that at Graefenberg, at this moment, there are amongst the visitors some of the leading nobles of England, Russia, Poland, Austria and Italy". A 1997 review of the hydropathic movement states: "At the peak of the movement in the late nineteenth century there were over fifty hydropathic hotels in Britain, of which the best-known were Smedley's at Matlock in Derbyshire and Ben Rhydding near Leeds. Scotland, however, was over-represented with over twenty", while Ireland had one.

There were a number of efforts towards sanitary reform in the nineteenth century, and the hydropathy movement is credited with contributing to this. "There can be no doubt that the Bath and Washhouse Movement received a great stimulus through the introduction of Hydropathy into this country, and the consequent dissemination of the curative virtues of water appliances, and sanitary reformers saw the necessity of personal cleanliness in order to ensure perfect health". Metcalfe notes that it was the attention drawn by the publication of Claridge's work "followed by others", that drew attention to hydropathy, "and gave a further stimulus to the movement which resulted in the passing of the Baths and Washhouses Act of Sir George Grey, in 1846, himself a zealous advocate of hydropathy". A series of statutes followed, which became known collectively as "The Baths and Wash-houses Acts 1846 to 1896". This was an important milestone in the improvement of sanitary conditions and public health in those times, with early, strong support for the promotion of public baths and washhouses from prominent advocates of sanitary reform such as Erasmus Wilson, who applauded the establishment of Public Baths and Wash-houses, as "amongst the noblest of the institutions...as they are one of the greatest discoveries of the present age". Claridge himself was an early advocate, dating back to a lecture he gave in Edinburgh in 1843. Claridge's Scottish lecture tours highlight overlap of yet another movement with that of hydropathy, namely that of the temperance movement, with both the temperance and hydropathy movements feeding off each other.

Claridge revisited Graefenberg, from where in July 1845, he wrote a letter to the New York Tribune, which was reproduced in New York's Water Cure Journal in May 1846. And in October 1845, Claridge was one of 124 signatories in an address to Arch-Duke Franz Carl, extolling the virtues of Vincent Priessnitz and his methods. He sent another letter from Graefenberg on 4 March 1846, this time to an American acquaintance. In this wide-ranging letter, amongst other things he commends the progress of the Water-Cure in America, and describes the progress in Great Britain, including the growth of washhouses. He also comments on some of the criticism against him and other hydropathy proponents, and discusses a book by Dr Erasmus Wilson. He also acknowledges the antiquity of hydropathy, and the work of his predecessors, such as "Dr Sir John Floyer", and his work Febrifugum Magnum, and Dr James Currie. On the antiquity of hydropathy, Claridge addresses some of his critics, stating that "we are not urging its novelty, but its UTILITY" (p. 2, emphases in original text), and praises Priessnitz for bringing it to the fore again.

== Publications by Claridge ==
This list comprises known publications by Claridge. Apart from the Spanish translation and the Abstract of Hydropathy, the primary sources here are Metcalfe, who lists all of Claridge's publications so far referred to in this article, and Browne, who gives a brief mention of Claridge and his works on the first page of her article.

- Claridge, R.T. (1837). A Guide Along the Danube, from Vienna to Constantinople, Smyrna, Athens, The Morea, The Ionian Islands, and Venice. From the notes of a journey, made in the year 1836. With Maps of the Route. London: F.C. Westley.
- —— (1839). A Guide Down the Danube, from Paris to Marseilles, Ancona, Trieste, Venice, Munich, Strasburg; and from Constantinople, Smyrna, Athens, The Morea, and the Ionian Islands. Also, the Route to India by way of Egypt (New ed.). London: F.C. Westley; and Madden & Co. Full text at Internet Archive (archive.org)
- —— (1842). Hydropathy; or The Cold Water Cure, as practised by Vincent Priessnitz, at Graefenberg, Silesia, Austria (3rd ed.). London: James Madden and Co. Full text at Internet Archive (archive.org)
- —— (1843). Hydropathy; or The Cold Water Cure, as practised by Vincent Priessnitz, at Graefenberg, Silesia, Austria (5th ed.). London: James Madden and Co. Hardcopy edition.
- —— (1843). Hydropathy; or The Cold Water Cure, as practised by Vincent Priessnitz, at Graefenberg, Silesia, Austria (8th ed.). London: James Madden and Co. Full text at Internet Archive (archive.org)
- Abstract of Hydropathy. London: James Madden and Co. 1843. (Google Books).
- —— (1844). Facts and Evidence in Support of Hydropathy; being the subject of lectures delivered in a tour through Ireland and Scotland, 1843. London: James Madden and Co.
- —— (1849). Every Man His Own Doctor; The Cold Water, Tepid Water, and Friction Cure, as applicable to every disease to which the human frame is subject. And also to The Cure of Disease in Horses and Cattle. London: James Madden and Co. Full text at Internet Archive (archive.org). Note the pagination is close, but not exactly the same, as the American edition.
- —— (1849). Every Man His Own Doctor; The Cold Water, Tepid Water, and Friction Cure, as applicable to every disease to which the human frame is subject. And also to The Cure of Disease in Horses and Cattle. New York: John Wiley. Full text at Internet Archive (archive.org). Note the pagination is close, but not exactly the same, as the English edition.
- —— (1849). Cholera: its Prevention and Cure by Hydropathy, with Observations on the Treatment of Colic, Diarrhoea, and Dysentery. London.
- —— (1849). Familiar Guide to Hydropathy. London: James Madden and Co.
- —— (1850). Hidropathia o cura por medico del agua fria, segun la practica de Vincente Priessnitz. Buenos Aires: Imprinta Americana. Spanish translation of the English book.

== Notes ==
a. It is difficult to resolve the birth year discrepancies without access to a copy of original documents, although the IGI record looks specific, whereas the biographical sketch clearly includes indirect sources for some of its information (which does match collateral sources already cited in this article). However, a range of collateral information leaves no doubt that they refer to the same person.

b. Hydropathy, Cold Water system, and Cold Water cure, were essentially synonymous in that era, with publications under those titles all referring to the same legacy, namely Priessnitz, and – for U.K. publications – often also Claridge. So searches for publications from that period would need to try all three variations to capture relevant works.

c. The Encyclopædia Britannica (11th ed.) states that Claridge introduced hydropathy to England in 1840. However, Claridge describes himself as first paying attention to hydropathy in the winter of 1840, following which he was confined to bed for nearly two months before proceeding to Graefenberg, where he stayed for three months. From his comments on page 81, it is evident that he was at Graefenberg sometime around September 1841. Claridge himself cites 1842 as the year in which "a new era" commenced.

d. The Lancet review states (p. 833): "Mr Claridge will probably find that he made a mistake in turning his talents to physic, and crying water about the streets; he had better have continued crying 'there is nothing like leather ', or 'there is nothing like aspalt ', or 'there is nothing like wood '. We do not feel called upon to notice his asphaltic squireship's aspersions on the character of the medical profession".

e. To aid in finding information on Claridge's portrait, it is noted that at the time (1844), artist James John Hill was residing at 58 Newman Street, as listed in Johnson's book, and was still there in 1848, per Graves (1908).

f.' Indeed, a search for material for the section on Claridge's Patent Asphalte Co. brings up increasing reference to the case as the range of search terms is both expanded and refined.

g. The preface to the first edition remained in all known subsequent editions, including the third (which had its own additional preface), the fifth, and the eighth (both of which contain only the preface from the first edition)

h. The pagination for the text of the fifth and eighth editions are the same, so where practical, citations will be from the eighth, since that is available online. The only visible differences between the fifth and eighth editions are that the fifth includes two additions at either end of the book, not affecting the pagination. These are, the inclusion of a hand-written letter at the front, and at the back, "Critical notices of Captain Claridge's Hydropathy."

i. At least some hydropathy proponents appreciated the humour in this, as evidenced it being quoted in the humour section of the 1849 Water-Cure Journal. Light-hearted satire about the water cure was also engaged in by a theatrical group.

j. Munde operated the Florence Water-Cure, at Florence, Massachusetts (see preface in his 1857 book, p.vi). He previously migrated from Germany at an unknown date. However, in his text, he does cite a case he dealt with in Dresden in the winter of 1845–46. His own familiarity with Priessnitz's methods date back to circa 1836, when he was "almost a novice in Priessnitz's practice". "During an epidemic of scarlatina" in the city of Freiberg, two of his children, boys aged about 5 and 8, contracted the disease (p. 65). Two Internet Archive texts are available, each with missing pages at the front. All pages are covered between the two online texts. Alternatively, the full text is available on the Project Gutenberg site.
