= Lázně Jeseník =

Coordinates: 50°14′24″N 17°11′10″E

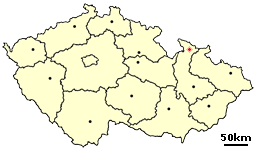
Location of Lázně Jeseník in the Czech Republic

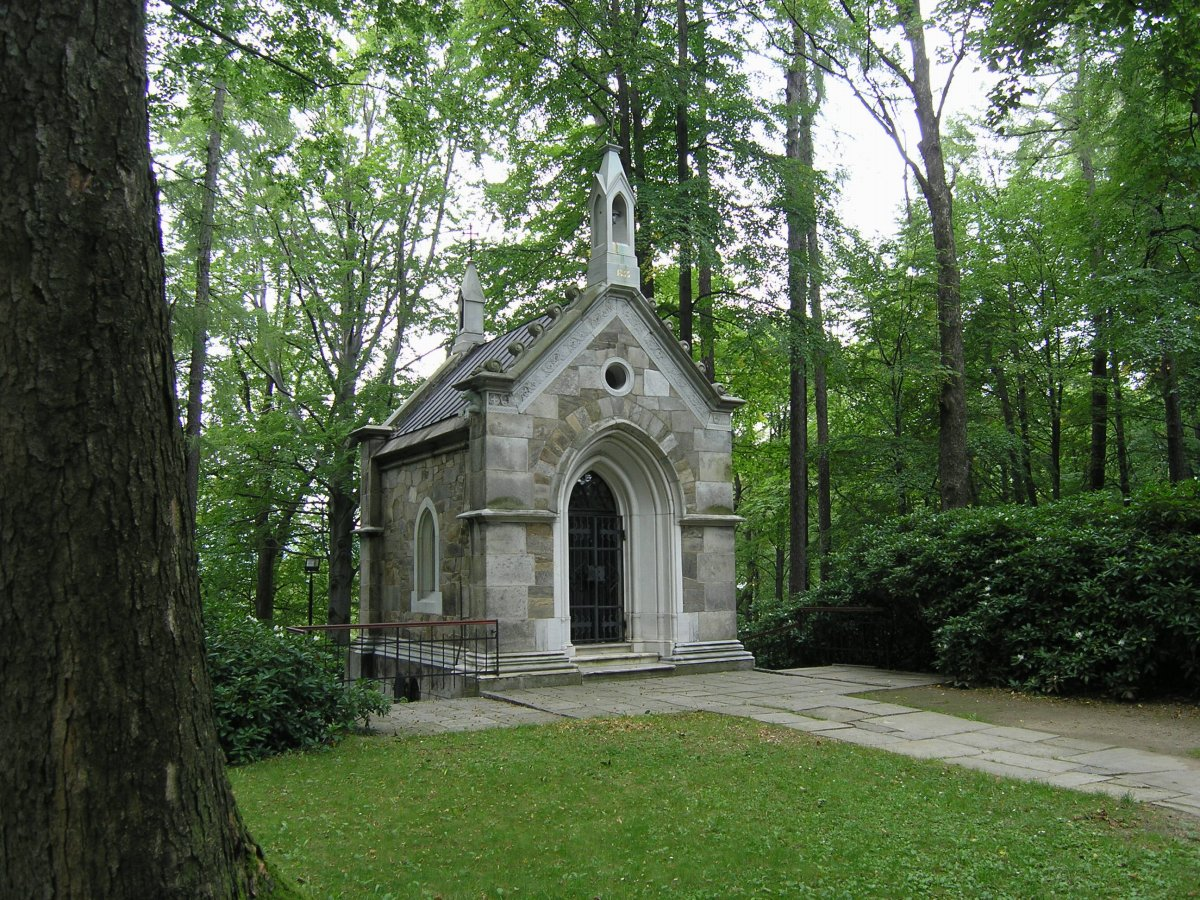
Chapel on the Vincent Priessnitz vault, Gräfenberg Hill

Lázně Jeseník (German: Bad Gräfenberg) is a spa resort in Jeseník in the Olomouc Region of the Czech Republic.

The place is known for its connection with Vincent Priessnitz, an early proponent of hydrotherapy. Priessnitz had founded the first modern hydrotherapeutic institute in the world here. It is also known for the Sanatorium Priessnitz building designed by Leopold Bauer, and many springs.
