= Marcel Švejdík =

Czech footballer

Personal information
- Date of birth: 30 August 1973 (age 53)
- Place of birth: Czechoslovakia
- Position: Midfielder

Senior career*
Years	Team	Apps	(Gls)
1993–1994	FC Viktoria Plzeň	29	(3)
1994–1995	FC Petra Drnovice	7	(0)
1995	FC Union Cheb	15	(2)
1996	FC Svit Zlín	14	(0)
1996	Bohemians Prague	10	(0)
1997–2001	FC Viktoria Plzeň	58	(3)
2001	MŠK Žilina		

International career
2004	Czech Republic U21	3	(1)
- * Club domestic league appearances and goals

Marcel Švejdík (born 30 August 1973) is a retired Czech football midfielder. He played in the Gambrinus liga for various clubs, playing a total of over 100 top-flight matches. He also played in Slovakia for MŠK Žilina, signing for the club in 2001.

Švejdík played international football at under-21 level for Czech Republic U21.
