= Hydrotherapy =

Alternative medicine using water for pain relief and treatment

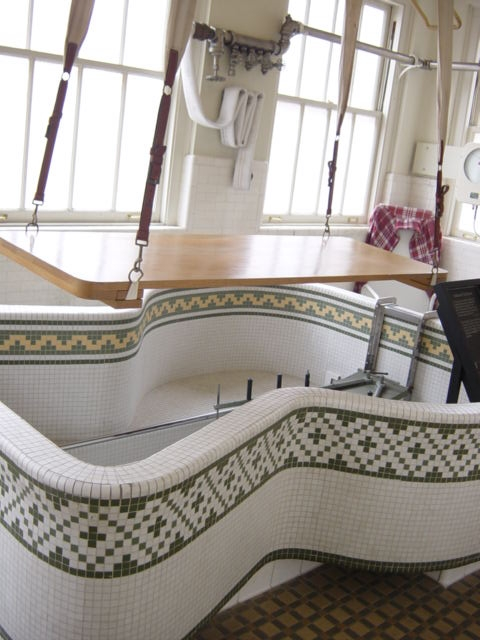
- Hubbard tub with wooden patient lift
- ICD-9-CM: 93.31-93.33
- MeSH: D006875

Hydrotherapy, formerly called hydropathy and also called water cure, is a branch of alternative medicine (particularly naturopathy), occupational therapy, and physiotherapy, that involves the use of water for pain relief and treatment. The term encompasses a broad range of approaches and therapeutic methods that take advantage of the physical properties of water, such as temperature and pressure, to stimulate blood circulation and treat the symptoms of certain diseases.

Various therapies used in the present-day hydrotherapy employ water jets, underwater massage and mineral baths (e.g. balneotherapy, Iodine-Grine therapy, Kneipp treatments, Scotch hose, Swiss shower, thalassotherapy) or whirlpool bath, hot Roman bath, hot tub, Jacuzzi, and cold plunge.

Hydrotherapy lacks robust evidence supporting its efficacy beyond placebo effects. Systematic reviews of randomized controlled trials have consistently found no clear evidence of curative effects, citing methodological flaws and insufficient data. Overall, the scientific consensus indicates that hydrotherapy's benefits are not conclusively greater than those of placebo treatments.

== Uses ==
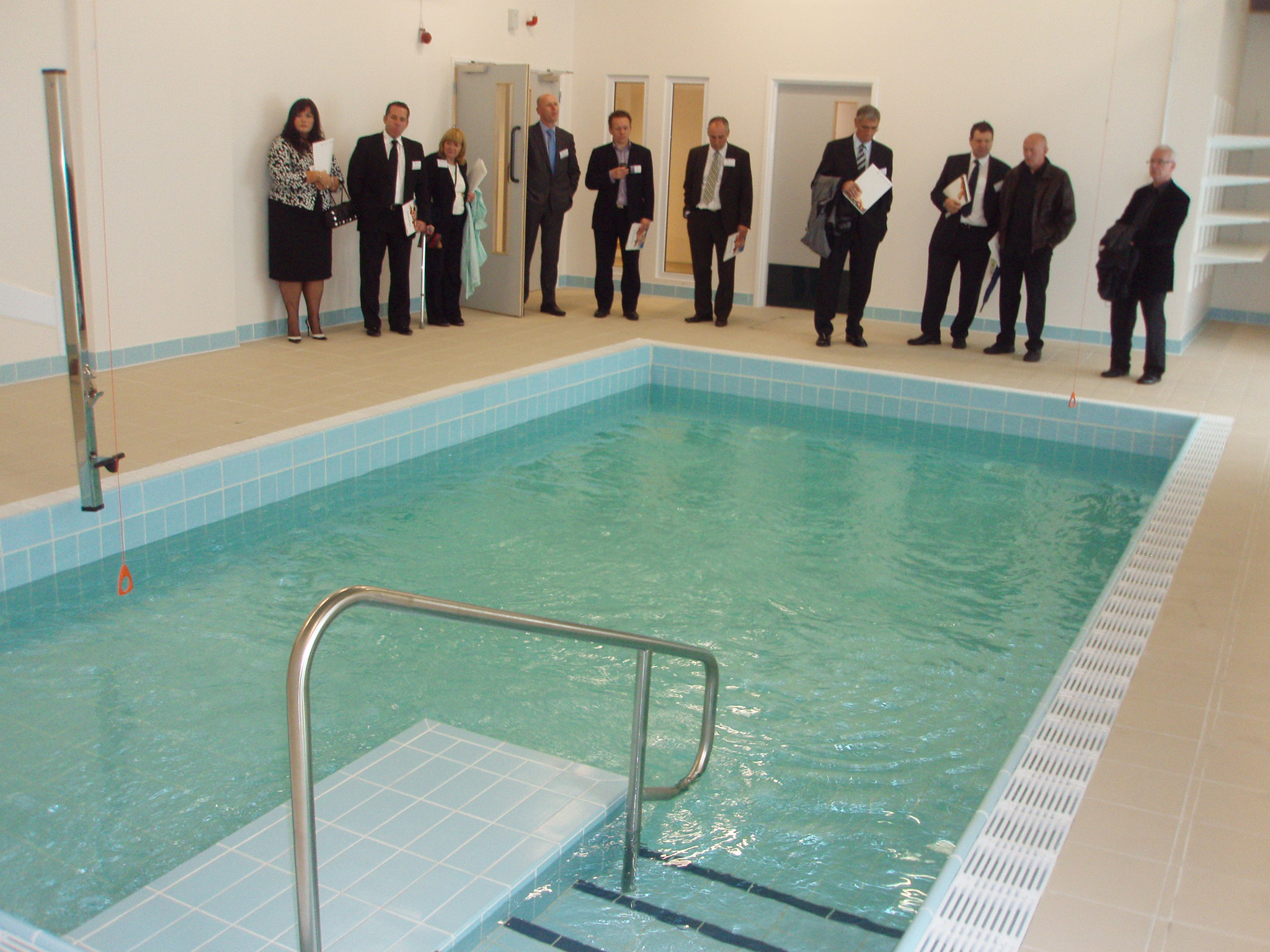
Opening of the new Hydrotherapy Pool, Manchester Royal Infirmary, 2009

Water therapy may be restricted to use as aquatic therapy, a form of physical therapy, and a cleansing agent. However, it is also used as a medium for delivering heat and cold to the body, which has long been the basis for its application. Hydrotherapy involves a range of methods and techniques, many of which use water as a medium to facilitate thermoregulatory reactions for therapeutic benefit.

Shower-based hydrotherapy techniques have been increasingly used in preference to full-immersion methods, partly for the ease of cleaning the equipment and reducing infections due to contamination. When removal of tissue is necessary for the treatment of wounds, hydrotherapy, which performs selective mechanical debridement can be used. Examples of this include directed wound irrigation and therapeutic irrigation with suction.

== Technique ==
The following methods are used for their hydrotherapeutic effects:

- Packings, general and local;
- Hot air and steam baths;
- General baths;
- Treadmills;
- Colon Hydrotherapy (Enemas);
- Sitz (sitting), spinal, head, and foot baths;
- Bandages or compresses, wet and dry; also;
- Fomentations and poultices, sinapisms, stupes, rubbings, and water potations.

Hydrotherapy, which involves submerging all or part of the body in water, can involve several types of equipment:

- Full body immersion tanks (a "Hubbard tank" is a large size)
- Arm, hip, and leg whirlpool

Whirling water movement, provided by mechanical pumps, has been used in water tanks since at least the 1940s. Similar technologies have been marketed for recreational use under the terms "hot tub" or "spa".

In some cases, baths with whirlpool water flow are not used to manage wounds, as a whirlpool will not selectively target the tissue to be removed, and can damage all tissue. Whirlpools also create an unwanted risk of bacterial infection, can damage fragile body tissue, and in the case of treating arms and legs, bring risk of complications from edema.

== History ==
The therapeutic use of water has been recorded in ancient Egyptian, Greek and Roman civilizations. Egyptian royalty bathed with essential oils and flowers. Romans had communal public baths for their citizens. Hippocrates prescribed bathing in spring water for sickness. Other cultures noted for a long history of hydrotherapy include China and Japan, the latter being centred primarily around Japanese hot springs. Many such histories predate the Roman thermae.

=== Modern revival ===
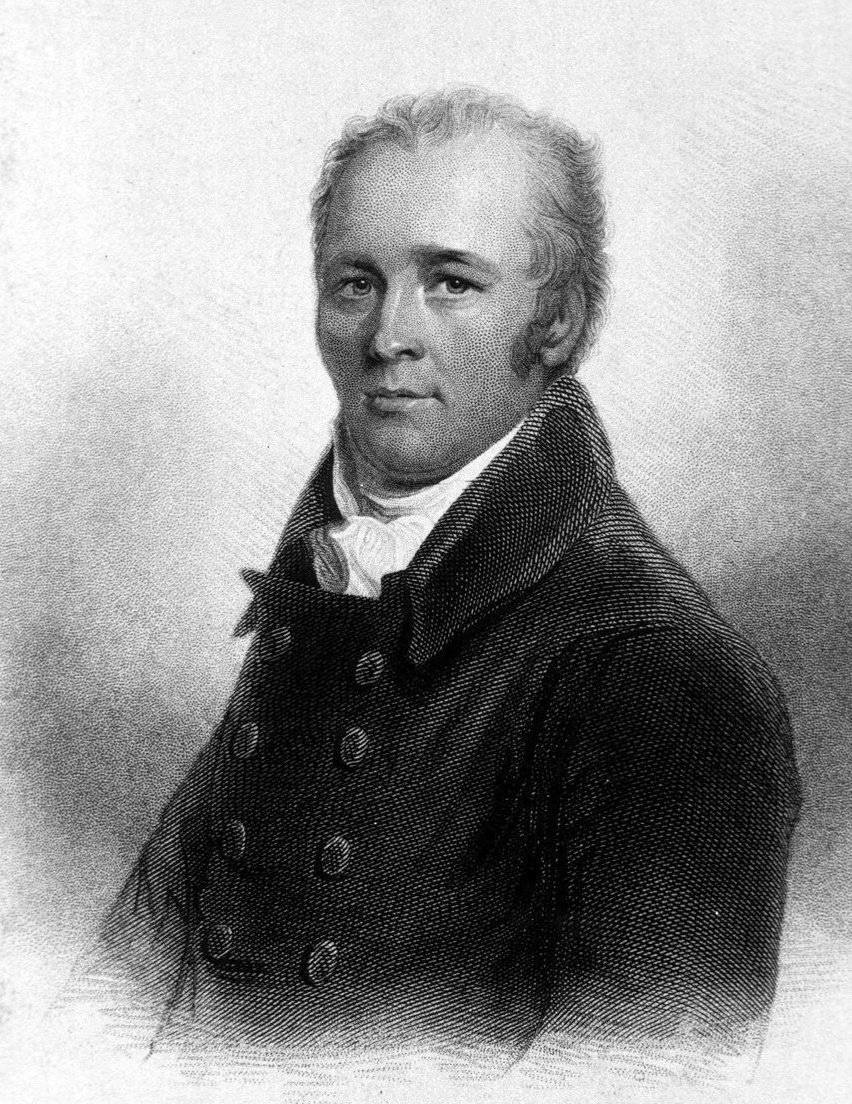
James Currie, who, according to Captain R. T. Claridge, discovered "...the merit of settling the use of cold water...[and who established] the scientific base of Hydropathy"

Hydrotherapy became more prominent following the growth and development of modern medical practices in the 18th and 19th centuries. As traditional medical practice became increasingly professional, it was felt that medical treatment became increasingly less personalized. The development of hydrotherapy was believed to be a more personal form of medical treatment that did not necessarily present to patients the alienating scientific language that modern developments of medical treatment entailed.

==== 1700–1810 ====
Two English works on the medical uses of water were published in the 18th century that inaugurated the new fashion for hydrotherapy. One of these was by Sir John Floyer, a physician of Lichfield, who, struck by the remedial use of certain springs by the neighbouring peasantry, investigated the history of cold bathing and published a book on the subject in 1702. The book ran through six editions within a few years, and the translation of this book into German was largely drawn upon by J. S. Hahn of Silesia as the basis for his book called On the Healing Virtues of Cold Water, Inwardly and Outwardly Applied, as Proved by Experience, published in 1738.

The other work was a 1797 publication by James Currie of Liverpool on the use of hot and cold water in the treatment of fever and other illnesses, with a fourth edition published in 1805, not long before his death. It was also translated into German by Michaelis (1801) and Hegewisch (1807). It was highly popular and first placed the subject on a scientific basis. Hahn's writings had meanwhile created much enthusiasm among his countrymen, societies having been formed everywhere to promote the medicinal and dietetic use of water; and in 1804 Professor E.F.C. Oertel of Anspach republished them and quickened the popular movement by unqualified commendation of water drinking as a remedy for all diseases.

The general idea behind hydropathy during the 1800s was to be able to induce something called a crisis. The thinking was that water invaded any cracks, wounds, or imperfections in the skin, which were filled with impure fluids. Health was considered to be the body's natural state, and filling these spaces with pure water would flush the impurities out, which would rise to the skin's surface, producing pus. The event of this pus emerging was called a crisis, and was achieved through a multitude of methods. These methods included techniques such as sweating, the plunging bath, the half bath, the head bath, the sitting bath, and the douche bath. All of these were ways to gently expose the patient to cold water in different ways.

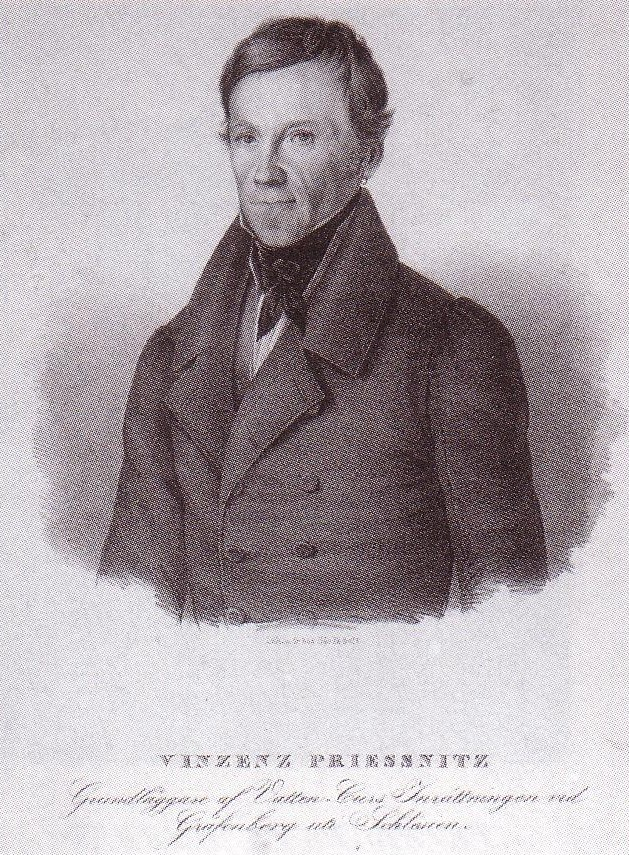
Vincenz Priessnitz, who initiated the popular revival of hydrotherapy at Gräfenberg

==== Vincenz Priessnitz (1799–1851) ====
Vincenz Priessnitz was the son of a peasant farmer who, as a young child, observed a wounded deer bathing a wound in a pond near his home. Over several days, he would see this deer return, and eventually the wound was healed. Later, as a teenager, Priessnitz was attending to a horse cart, when the cart ran him over, breaking three of his ribs. A physician told him that they would never heal. Priessnitz decided to try his hand at healing himself and wrapped his wounds with damp bandages. By daily changing his bandages and drinking large quantities of water, after about a year, his broken ribs had healed. Priessnitz quickly gained fame in his hometown and became the consulting physician.

Later in life, Priessnitz became the head of a hydropathy clinic in Gräfenberg in 1826. He was extremely successful and by 1840, he had 1600 patients in his clinic, including many fellow physicians, and important political figures such as nobles and prominent military officials. Treatment length at Priessnitz's clinic varied. Much of his theory was about inducing the aforementioned crisis, which could happen quickly or could occur after three to four years. Under the simplistic nature of hydropathy, a large part of the treatment was based on living a simple lifestyle. These lifestyle adjustments included dietary changes such as eating only very coarse food, such as jerky and bread, and of course, drinking large quantities of water. Priessnitz's treatments also included a great deal of less strenuous exercise, mostly including walking. Ultimately, Priessnitz's clinic was extremely successful, and he gained fame across the western world. His practice even influenced the hydropathy that took root overseas in America.

==== Sebastian Kneipp (1821–1897) ====
Sebastian Kneipp was born in Germany, and he considered his role in hydropathy to be that of continuing Priessnitz's work. Kneipp's practice of hydropathy was even gentler than the norm. He believed that typical hydropathic practices deployed were "too violent or too frequent," and he expressed concern that such techniques would cause emotional or physical trauma to the patient. Kneipp's practice was more all-encompassing than Priessnitz's, and his practice involved not only curing the patients' physical woes, but also emotional and mental as well.

Kneipp introduced four additional principles to the therapy: medicinal herbs, massages, balanced nutrition, and "regulative therapy to seek inner balance". Kneipp had a very simple view of an already simple practice. For him, hydropathy's primary goals were strengthening the constitution and removing poisons and toxins in the body. These basic interpretations of how hydropathy worked hinted at his complete lack of medical training. Kneipp did have, however, a very successful medical practice despite, perhaps even because of, his lack of medical training. As mentioned above, some patients were beginning to feel uncomfortable with traditional doctors because of the elitism of the medical profession. The new terms and techniques that doctors were using were difficult for the average person to understand. Having no formal training, all of his instructions and published works are described in easy-to-understand language and would have seemed very appealing to a patient who was displeased with the direction traditional medicine was taking.

A significant factor in the popular revival of hydrotherapy was that it could be practised relatively cheaply at home. The growth of hydrotherapy (or 'hydropathy' to use the name of the time) was thus partly derived from two interacting spheres: "the hydro and the home".

Hydrotherapy as a formal medical tool dates from about 1829 when Vincenz Priessnitz (1799–1851), a farmer of Gräfenberg in Silesia, then part of the Austrian Empire, began his public career in the paternal homestead, extended so as to accommodate the increasing numbers attracted by the fame of his cures.

At Gräfenberg, to which the fame of Priessnitz drew people of every rank and many countries, medical men were conspicuous by their numbers, some being attracted by curiosity, others by the desire of knowledge, but the majority by the hope of cure for ailments which had as yet proved incurable. Many records of experiences at Gräfenberg were published, all more or less favorable to the claims of Priessnitz, and some enthusiastic in their estimate of his genius and penetration.

=== Spread of hydrotherapy ===
Hydropathic applications according to Claridge's Hydropathy book

Captain R. T. Claridge was responsible for introducing and promoting hydropathy in Britain, first in London in 1842, then with lecture tours in Ireland and Scotland in 1843. His 10-week tour in Ireland included Limerick, Cork, Wexford, Dublin and Belfast, over June, July and August 1843, with two subsequent lectures in Glasgow.

Some other Englishmen preceded Claridge to Graefenberg, although not many. One of these was James Wilson, who himself, along with James Manby Gully, established and operated a water cure establishment at Malvern in 1842. In 1843, Wilson and Gully published a comparison of the efficacy of the water-cure with drug treatments, including accounts of some cases treated at Malvern, combined with a prospectus of their Water Cure Establishment. Then in 1846 Gully published The Water Cure in Chronic Disease, further describing the treatments available at the clinic.

The fame of the water-cure establishment grew, and Gully and Wilson became well-known national figures. Two more clinics were opened at Malvern. Famous patients included Charles Darwin, Charles Dickens, Thomas Carlyle, Florence Nightingale, Lord Tennyson and Samuel Wilberforce. With his fame he also attracted criticism: Sir Charles Hastings, a physician and founder of the British Medical Association, was a forthright critic of hydropathy, and Gully in particular.

From the 1840s, hydropathics were established across Britain. Initially, many of these were small institutions, catering to at most dozens of patients. By the later nineteenth century, the typical hydropathic establishment had evolved into a more substantial undertaking, with thousands of patients treated annually for weeks at a time in a large purpose-built building with lavish facilities – baths, recreation rooms and the like – under the supervision of fully trained and qualified medical practitioners and staff.

In Germany, France, America, and the UK (especially in Scotland), the number of hydropathic establishments rapidly increased. Antagonism ran high between the old practice and the new. Unsparing condemnation was heaped by each on the other; and a legal prosecution, leading to a royal commission of inquiry, served but to make Priessnitz and his system stand higher in public estimation.

Increasing popularity soon diminished caution about whether the new method would help minor ailments and benefit the more seriously injured. Hydropathists occupied themselves mainly with studying chronic invalids well able to bear a rigorous regimen and the severities of unrestricted crisis. The need of a radical adaptation to the former class was first adequately recognized by John Smedley, a manufacturer of Derbyshire, who, impressed in his own person with the severities as well as the benefits of the cold water cure, practised among his workpeople a milder form of hydropathy, and began about 1852 a new era in its history, founding at Matlock a counterpart of the establishment at Gräfenberg.

Ernst Brand (1827–1897) of Berlin, Raljen and Theodor von Jürgensen of Kiel, and Karl Liebermeister of Basel, between 1860 and 1870, employed the cooling bath in abdominal typhus with striking results, and led to its introduction to England by Wilson Fox. In the Franco-German War the cooling bath was largely employed, in conjunction frequently with quinine; and it was used in the treatment of hyperpyrexia.

=== Hot-air baths ===
Hydrotherapy, especially as promoted during the height of its Victorian revival, has often been associated with cold water, as evidenced by many titles from that era. However, not all therapists limited their practice of hydrotherapy to cold water, even during the height of this popular revival.

The specific use of heat was often associated with Victorian Turkish baths. Inspired by David Urquhart's travel book, The Pillars of Hercules, and with Urquhart’s help, Dr Richard Barter built the first such bath at his hydropathic establishment near Blarney, Co. Cork, Ireland in 1856. Urquhart built the first bath open to the general public in Manchester the following year, and soon baths were being opened around the whole of the then UK and British Empire. Over 800 such baths were opened in the British Isles between 1856 and the 1970s. Today, only 11 remain open. The Victorian Turkish bath became a public institution, and, with the morning tub and the general practice of water drinking, is the most noteworthy of the many contributions by hydropathy to public health.

=== Spread to the United States ===
The first U.S. hydropathic facilities were established by Joel Shew and Russell Thacher Trall in the 1840s. Charles Munde also established early hydrotherapy facilities in the 1850s. Trall also co-edited the Water Cure Journal.

By 1850, it was said that "there are probably more than one hundred" facilities, along with numerous books and periodicals, including the New York Water Cure Journal, which had "attained an extent of circulation equalled by few monthlies in the world". By 1855, there were attempts by some to weigh the evidence of treatments in vogue at that time.

In October 1863, Dr Charles Shepard added a Victorian Turkish bath, the first in the United States, to his hydropathic Sanitorium in Brooklyn Heights, and two years later, Dr Martin L Holbrook opened the first in Manhattan. They then spread across the country as fast as they did in the British Isles, making a similar impact on hydropathic practice.

Following the introduction of hydrotherapy to the U.S., John Harvey Kellogg employed it at Battle Creek Sanitarium, which opened in 1866, where he strove to improve the scientific foundation for hydrotherapy. Other notable hydropathic centers of the era included the Cleveland Water Cure Establishment, founded in 1848, which operated successfully for two decades, before being sold to an organization which transformed it into an orphanage.

At its height, there were over 200 water-cure establishments in the United States, most located in the northeast. Few of these lasted into the postbellum years, although some survived into the 20th century, including institutions in Scott (Cortland County), Elmira, Clifton Springs and Dansville. While none were in Jefferson County, the Oswego Water Cure operated in the city of Oswego.

=== Subsequent developments ===
In November 1881, the British Medical Journal noted that hydropathy was a specific instance, or "particular case", of general principles of thermodynamics. That is, "the application of heat and cold in general", as it applies to physiology, mediated by hydropathy. In 1883, another writer stated "Not, be it observed, that hydropathy is a water treatment after all, but that water is the medium for the application of heat and cold to the body".

Hydrotherapy was used to treat people with mental illness in the 19th and 20th centuries and before World War II, various forms of hydrotherapy were used to treat alcoholism. The basic text of the Alcoholics Anonymous fellowship, Alcoholics Anonymous, reports that A.A. co-founder Bill Wilson was treated by hydrotherapy for his alcoholism in the early 1930s.

=== Recent techniques ===
A subset of cryotherapy involves cold water immersion or ice baths, used by physical therapists, sports medicine facilities, and rehab clinics. Proponents assert that it results in improved return of blood flow and byproducts of cellular breakdown to the lymphatic system and more efficient recycling.

Alternating the temperatures, either in a shower or complementary tanks, combines hot and cold in the same session. Proponents claim improvement in the circulatory system and lymphatic drainage. Experimental evidence suggests that contrast hydrotherapy helps to reduce injury in the acute stages by stimulating blood flow and reducing swelling.

== Society and culture ==
The growth of hydrotherapy and various forms of hydropathic establishments resulted in a form of tourism, both in the UK, and in Europe. At least one book listed English, Scottish, Irish and European establishments suitable for each specific malady, while another focused primarily on German spas and hydropathic establishments, but including other areas. While many bathing establishments were open all year round, doctors advised patients not to go before May, "nor to remain after October. English visitors rather prefer cold weather, and they often arrive for the baths in May and return in September. Americans come during the whole season, but prefer summer. The most fashionable and crowded time is during July and August". In Europe, interest in various forms of hydrotherapy and spa tourism continued unabated through the 19th century and into the 20th century, where "in France, Italy and Germany, several million people spend time each year at a spa." In 1891, when Mark Twain toured Europe and discovered that a bath of spring water at Aix-les-Bains soothed his rheumatism, he described the experience as "so enjoyable that if I hadn't had a disease I would have borrowed one just to have a pretext for going on".

This was not the first time such forms of spa tourism had been popular in Europe and the U.K. Indeed,

in Europe, the application of water in the treatment of fevers and other maladies had, since the seventeenth century, been consistently promoted by a number of medical writers. In the eighteenth century, taking to the waters became a fashionable pastime for the wealthy classes who decamped to resorts around Britain and Europe to cure the ills of over-consumption. In the main, treatment in the heyday of the British spa consisted of sense and sociability: promenading, bathing, and the repetitive quaffing of foul-tasting mineral waters.

A hydropathic establishment is a place where people receive hydropathic treatment. They are commonly built in spa towns, where mineral-rich or hot water occurs naturally.

Several hydropathic institutions wholly transferred their operations away from therapeutic purposes to become tourist hotels in the late 20th century while retaining the name 'Hydro'. There are several prominent examples in Scotland at Crieff, Peebles and Seamill amongst others.

== Animal hydrotherapy ==
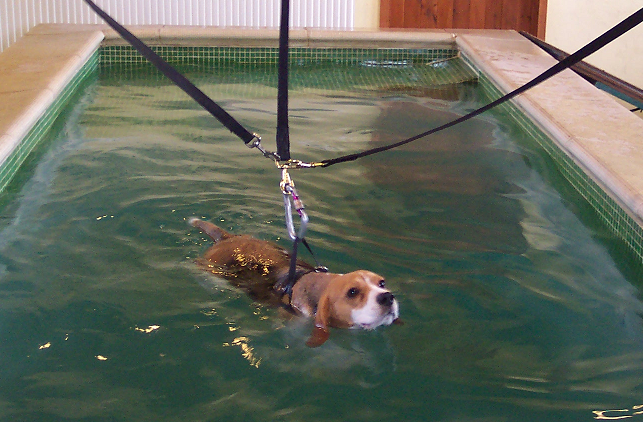
A beagle swimming in a harness in a hydrotherapy pool

Canine hydrotherapy is a form of hydrotherapy directed at the treatment of chronic conditions, post-operative recovery, and pre-operative or general fitness in dogs.

== See also ==
- Balneotherapy or "bath therapy"
- Colon cleansing
- Destination spa
- Enema
- Finnish sauna
- Halliwick
- Hot spring
- Hot tub
- Hydro massage
- Mineral spring
- Sebastian Kneipp
- Kneipp facility
- Spa
- Spa bath
- Spa town
- Steam shower
- Thalassotherapy
- Water aerobics

== Notes ==
a. While the second sense, of water as a form of torture is documented back to at least the 15th century, the first use of the term water cure as a torture is indirectly dated to around 1898, by U.S. soldiers in the Spanish–American War, after the term had been introduced to America in the mid-19th century in the therapeutic sense, which was in widespread use. Indeed, while the torture sense of water cure was by 1900–1902 established in the American army, with a conscious sense of irony, this sense was not in widespread use. Webster's 1913 dictionary cited only the therapeutic sense, water cure being synonymous with hydropathy, the term by which hydrotherapy was known in the 19th century and early 20th century.

The late 19th century expropriation of the term water cure, already in use in the therapeutic sense, to denote the polar opposite of therapy, namely torture, has the hallmark of arising in the sense of irony. This would be in keeping with some of the reactions to water cure therapy and its promotion, which included not only criticism, but also parody and satire.
