= Elizabeth Jenkins (writer) =

English novelist and biographer (1905–2010)

Elizabeth Jenkins OBE
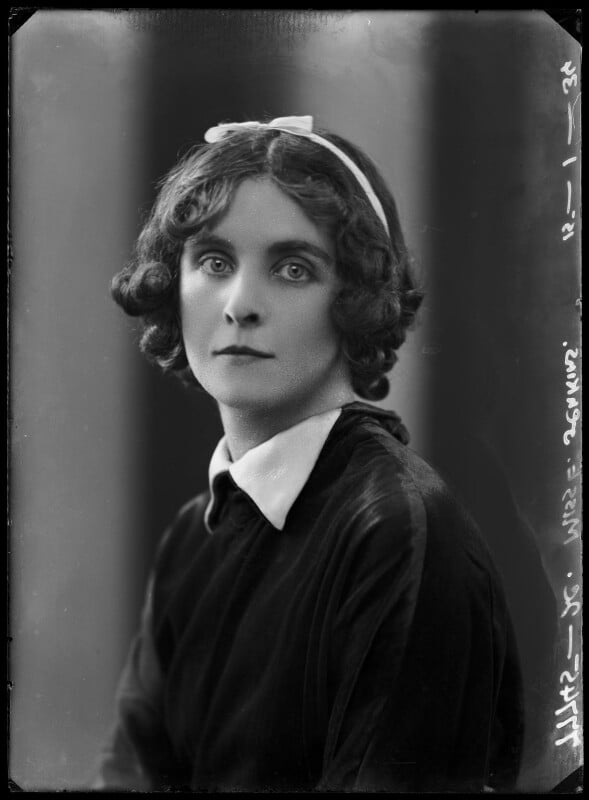
- Jenkins in 1934
- Born: Margaret Elizabeth Jenkins; 31 October 1905; Hitchin, Hertfordshire, England
- Died: 5 September 2010 (aged 104); Hampstead, London, England
- Education: Newnham College, Cambridge
- Occupations: Novelist and biographer
- Notable work: The Tortoise and the Hare (1954)

Margaret Elizabeth Jenkins OBE (31 October 1905 – 5 September 2010) was an English novelist and biographer of Jane Austen, Henry Fielding, Lady Caroline Lamb, Joseph Lister and Elizabeth I. Elizabeth Bowen said Jenkins was "among the most distinguished living English novelists."

== Early life ==
Elizabeth Jenkins was born on 31 October 1905 in Hitchin, Hertfordshire. Her father, James Heald Jenkins, established the Caldicott School in 1904, which he named for her mother, Theodora Caldicott Ingram.

She attended the Modern School and St Christopher School, Letchworth, and the women-only Newnham College, Cambridge, from 1921, a constituent college of the University of Cambridge, where she studied English and history, though women were not eligible to receive a degree from the university until 1948.

She took a position teaching English at King Alfred School in Hampstead in 1929. In 1939, when World War II started, she left her teaching position and worked assisting Jewish refugees and London air-raid victims for the Assistance Board. She later worked in government positions for the Board of Trade and the Ministry of Information.

After the war, she was a reader for Victor Gollancz Ltd, her publisher, and recommended John Braine's Room at the Top, for publication.

== Writing career ==
=== Novelist ===
Through Newnham's principal Pernel Strachey, Jenkins met Edith Sitwell and Virginia Woolf; Woolf would later call her first novel Virginia Water (1929) "a sweet white grape of a book". Jenkins sent her first novel to Victor Gollancz. When he realised it was the first thing she had written, he immediately gave her a contract for three books.

Her 1934 novel, Harriet (republished by Valancourt Books in 2015), a fictionalised account of the murder of Harriet Staunton whose relatives starved her to death to get to her inheritance, won the Prix Femina. She beat Evelyn Waugh's A Handful of Dust and Antonia White's Frost in May to the prize. The novels Doubtful Joy followed in 1935 and The Phoenix' Nest in 1936. Other novels include Robert and Helen (1944) and A Silent Joy (1992).

The Tortoise and the Hare (1954) is Jenkins' most successful novel. In his review of it, John Betjeman said: "I do not think there is a sentence in this book out of character." It is about a marriage that was deeply troubled despite surface appearances. It was praised by Hilary Mantel in The Sunday Times as showing that Jenkins "seems to know a good deal about how women think and how their lives are arranged".

Her 1972 novel, Dr. Gully's Story, Jenkins' favourite, retold the story of the 19th-century physician James Manby Gully, whose affair with Florence Bravo, and the subsequent poisoning death of her husband Charles Bravo, led to never-proven suspicions that Gully had committed murder.

=== Biographer ===
Jenkins published the first biographies of Lady Caroline Lamb in 1932 and of Jane Austen in 1938. She was involved in the establishment of the Jane Austen Society in 1940 and worked to purchase Austen's home in Chawton where she wrote Emma and other novels, and which later became the site of Jane Austen's House Museum.

Her 1958 biography, Elizabeth the Great, "showed her biographical talents at their most effective" and provided what The New York Times called "a psychological dimension to her portrait that other historians had scanted", an attribute that could also be seen in her 1960 book Joseph Lister. A. L. Rowse said that her biography of Elizabeth I "got nearer to penetrating the secret of the most remarkable woman in history than any other". In her 1961 book Elizabeth and Leicester, Jenkins presented her hypothesis that the violent ends of Anne Boleyn and Catherine Howard had made Elizabeth unable to establish a full sexual relationship with Robert Dudley, 1st Earl of Leicester because she associated sex with death.

== Later life ==
In all, Jenkins wrote a dozen novels and a dozen biographies. She was appointed an Officer of the Order of the British Empire (OBE) in the 1981 Birthday Honours. Her 2004 memoir The View from Downshire Hill recounted her decades of living in a Regency architecture home she bought in Hampstead, London. She moved into the house in 1939 and decorated it with Regency style furniture that she had acquired inexpensively in the years following World War II from period houses that had been damaged during the war. She would later say that, based on her decor, "people assumed I was comfortably off, instead of being very hard up".

Towards the end of her life, Jenkins told a journalist that she had had an affair with the prominent gynaecologist Sir Eardley Lancelot Holland. Holland was the basis of the character Evelyn in her 1954 book The Tortoise and the Hare, which Jenkins said was an autobiography "not in fact, but in feeling."

Jenkins died at the age of 104 on 5 September 2010 at a nursing home in Hampstead, where she had resided in the years before her death. She never married. She told Virginia Nicholson, "I just shuddered at the idea of childbirth, and then went on to something else."

== Bibliography ==
=== Novels ===
- 1929: Virginia Water
- 1931: The Winters
- 1933: Portrait of an Actor
- 1934: Harriet (Republished in 2012 by Persephone Books)
- 1935: Doubtful Joy
- 1936: The Phoenix' Nest
- 1944: Robert and Helen
- 1946: Young Enthusiasts
- 1954: The Tortoise and the Hare (Republished by Virago Books)
- 1963: Brightness
- 1968: Honey
- 1972: Dr Gully's Story
- 1992: A Silent Joy

=== Biographies ===
- 1932: Lady Caroline Lamb
- 1936: Jane Austen: A Biography
- 1947: Henry Fielding
- 1949: Six Criminal Women
- 1955: Ten Fascinating Women
- 1958: Elizabeth the Great
- 1960: Joseph Lister
- 1961: Elizabeth and Leicester
- 1978: The Princes in the Tower
- 1982: The Shadow and the Light

=== Memoir ===
- 2004: The View from Downshire Hill

=== Short stories ===
- 1955: "On No Account, My Love"
