= James Hunter Lane =

Scottish physician, surgeon and medical writer

Hunter Lane
- Born: 1806/7
- Died: 23 June 1853; Brighton
- Occupations: Physician, surgeon and medical writer

James Hunter Lane, sometimes called Hunter Lane, (1806/7 – 23 June 1853) was a Scottish physician, surgeon and medical writer.

== Biography ==
Lane was admitted a licentiate of the Royal College of Surgeons, Edinburgh, in 1829, and graduated M.D. at Edinburgh University in 1830. He was honorary physician to the Cholera Hospital, Liverpool, during 1831-2, and physician to the Lock Hospital of the Infirmary there in 1833. In 1834 he collaborated with James Manby Gully in a translation of ‘A Systematic Treatise on Comptarative Physiology,' by Professor Frederic Tiedemann of Heidelberg, 2vols. 8vo. In 1840 he was appointed senior physician of the Lancaster Infirmary, and in the same year brought out his ‘Compendium of Materia Medica and Pharmacy, adapted to the London Pharmacopœia, embodying all the new French, American, and Indian Medicines, an also comprising a summary of Practical Toxicology,' a work of considerable value in its day. He was shortly afterwards elected president of the Royal Medical Society of Edinburgh. For the last few years of his life Lane resided at 58 Brook Street, Grosvenor Square, and had an excellent London practice. He died at Brighton on 23 June 1853.

Besides the works mentioned, Lane contributed numerous articles to the medical papers, and for some time edited the ‘Liverpool Medical Gazette' and the ‘Monthly Archives of the Medical Science.' He is said also (Med. Direct. 1853) to have written an ‘Epitome of Practical Chemistry,'
