= George Johnson (physician) =

English physician

Sir George Johnson
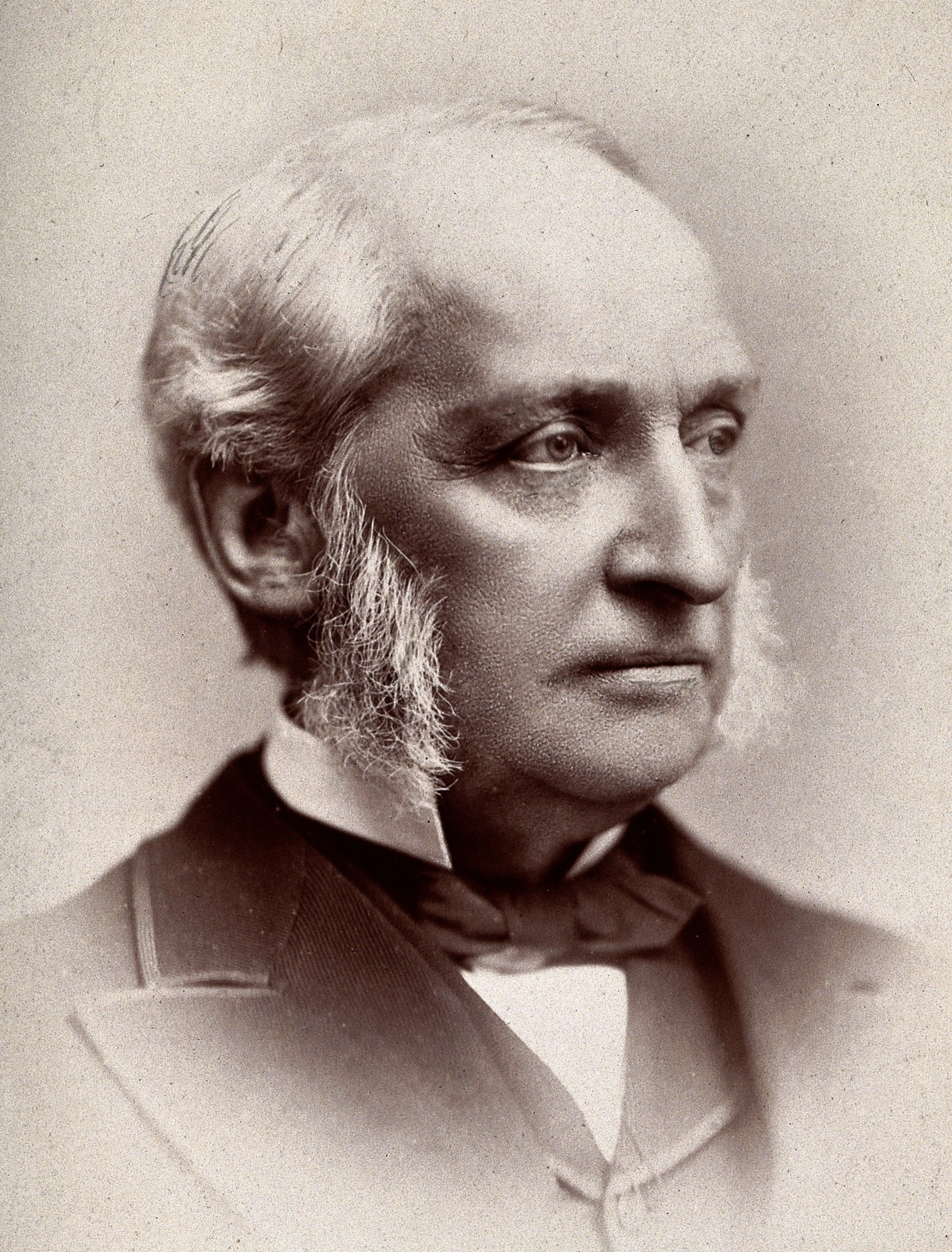
- Born: 29 November 1818; Goudhurst, Kent, England
- Died: 3 June 1896 (aged 77); London, England
- Occupation: Physician
- Known for: Treatment of cholera and kidney diseases

Sir George Johnson FRS (29 November 1818 – 3 June 1896) was an eminent English physician who became recognized as an authority on cholera and kidney diseases. Some of his theories are no longer accepted today.

== Birth and education ==
George Johnson was born on 29 November 1818 at Goudhurst, Kent, England. His father was a farmer and his mother was the daughter of an Edenbridge, Kent, timber merchant. He attended the local grammar school. In 1837 he was apprenticed to his uncle, a general practitioner at Cranbrook in Kent. In October 1839 he entered the medical school of King's College London. He was an outstanding scholar, winning many prizes and a senior medical scholarship. He won a Warneford prize in 1842 and graduated in 1843.

== Career ==
After leaving college, Johnson served in King's College Hospital as house physician and then house surgeon. In 1850 he was made an honorary fellow of King's College. He became an assistant physician at the hospital in 1847 and physician in 1856. From 1857 to 1863, he was Professor of Materia medica (pharmacology) and from 1863 to 1876 he was Professor of Medicine.

In 1862, Johnson was elected a member of the senate of the University of London. In 1865 he was appointed a consulting physician to the British Home and Hospital for Incurables, replacing Benjamin Guy Babington, who had resigned. In 1872, he was made a fellow of the Royal Society.

In 1876, Johnson attempted to treat Charles Bravo, a British lawyer who was fatally poisoned with antimony in what became known as "the Murder at the Priory". The Lancet of August 1876 published his detailed account of the symptoms, treatment and progress of the illness. From 1876 to 1886, Johnson was Professor of Clinical Medicine at Kings. In 1883, he was appointed consulting physician to the Royal College of Music. He was a Censor at the Royal College of Physicians, and in 1887 was appointed Vice President of this institution. He was President of the Royal Medical and Chirurgical Society in 1884.

In 1889 Queen Victoria made him a Physician-Extraordinary.

He was knighted in 1892.

In 1850, Johnson married Charlotte Elizabeth, daughter of Lieutenant William White of Addington, Surrey. They had five children. Frank Holl painted his portrait in 1888. This picture is now held by the Royal College of Physicians of London. He died from cerebral hemorrhage at his home in Savile Row, London, on 3 June 1896.

A memorial to him lies in St James's Church, Piccadilly.

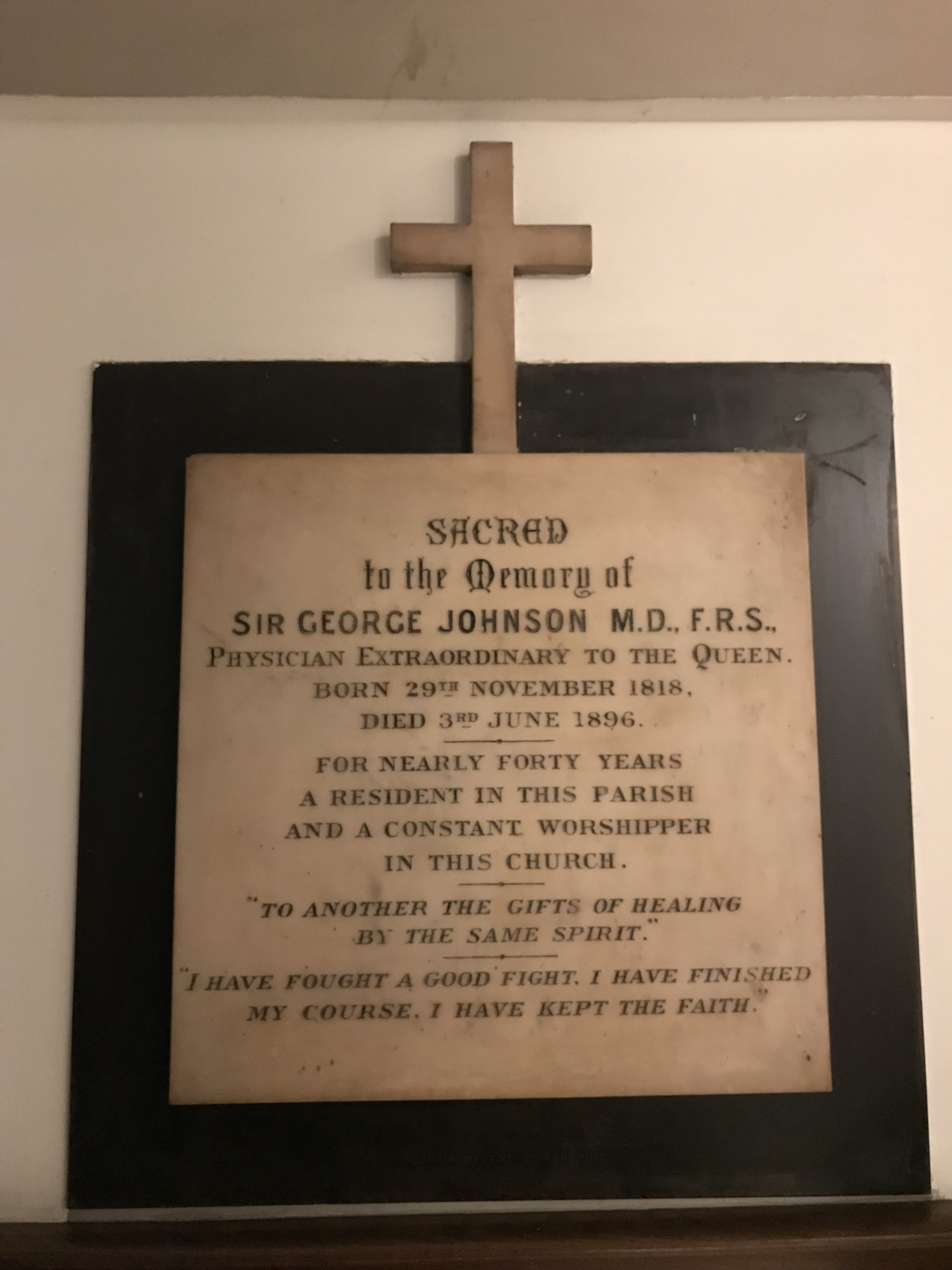
A memorial to George Johnson in St James's Church, Piccadilly.

== Work ==
Johnson became recognized as an authority on cholera and on kidney diseases, and published several works on these subjects. He was one of the first physicians to use the laryngoscope and the ophthalmoscope. He reintroduced the picric acid test for albumen and the picric acid and potash test for sugar. He was a strong supporter of the views of Richard Bright on kidney disease, and discovered hypertrophy of the small arteries in Bright's disease. His "stop-cock" theory to explain this finding led to a controversy with Sir William Gull over the "hyaline-fibroid degeneration".

Johnson was opposed to the astringent treatment of cholera. Instead he advocated the "evacuation treatment", to get rid of as many cholera bacteria as possible by purging the bowels. In 1832 William Brooke O'Shaughnessy had proposed saline injections as a way of restoring salts lost through the bowels, which today is considered a rational therapy. However, when Johnson reviewed results of this approach applied to 156 patients in 1832 he noted that only 25 had recovered. By 1848 the saline injection treatment was out of favor.

Johnson thought that cholera was caused by a poison in the blood producing right-sided heart congestion. He saw the vomiting and diarrhea of cholera as the body's attempt to expel the poison. He agreed that the blood of cholera victims differed in appearance from normal blood, but did not accept that this could be caused by dehydration. He felt that death occurred because the poison prevented blood from circulating through the right side of the heart, thus cutting off blood from the lungs and causing a death similar to that caused by asphyxiation. He considered that bleeding could help in the cure.

== Bibliography ==
- Johnson, Sir George (1852). On the diseases of the kidney. J.W. Parker & son.
- Johnson, Sir George (1864). The Laryngoscope. Hardwicke.
- Johnson, Sir George (1866). Notes on cholera, its nature and its treatment. Longmans, Green, and Co.
- Johnson, Sir George (1868). "A Lecture on the Pathology and Treatment of Epilepsy". British Medical Journal. 1 (377): 265–268. doi:10.1136/bmj.1.377.265. PMC 2309885. PMID 20745062.
- Johnson, Sir George (1870). On Cholera and Choleraic Diarrhoea: Their Nature, Cause and Treatment. Churchill.
- Johnson, Sir George (1874). Lectures on Bright's disease. Putnam.
- Johnson, Sir George (1884). On the various modes of testing for albumen and sugar in the urine: two lectures. Smith, Elder, & Co.
- Johnson, Sir George (1889). An Essay on Asphyxia. J & A Churchill.

== Notes and references ==
Citations

Sources

- Brown, G.H. (2009). "Sir George Johnson". Royal College of Physicians of London. Archived from the original on 17 October 2015.
- Clark, Sir George Norman; Briggs, Asa (15 September 2005). A History of the Royal College of Physicians of London. Vol. 4: 1948–1983. Oxford University Press. pp. 79–82. doi:10.1136/bmj.1.5427.79. ISBN 978-0-19-925334-0. PMC 2165065. PMID 14218483.
- Cook, Gordon Charles (1 June 2006). The Incurables Movement: An Illustrated History of the British Home. Radcliffe Publishing. ISBN 978-1-84619-082-7.
- Ruddick, James (1 December 2002). Death at the Priory: Love, Sex, and Murder in Victorian England. Grove Press. p. 196. ISBN 978-0-8021-3974-0.
- The Hospital. 1896. p. 72.
- Vinten-Johansen, Peter (2003). Cholera, Chloroform, and the Science of Medicine: A Life of John Snow. Oxford University Press. p. 198. ISBN 978-0-19-513544-2.
- Webb, William Wilfrid (1901). "Johnson, George (1818-1896)" . In Lee, Sidney (ed.). Dictionary of National Biography (1st supplement). Vol. 3. London: Smith, Elder & Co. pp. 44–45.
