= What Really Happened =

1926 novel by Marie Belloc Lowndes

- Author: Marie Belloc Lowndes
- Language: English
- Genre: Mystery crime
- Publisher: Hutchinson; Doubleday (US)
- Publication date: 1926
- Publication place: United Kingdom
- Media type: Print

What Really Happened is a 1926 crime novel by the British author Marie Belloc Lowndes. It was published in London by Hutchinson and in New York by Doubleday. In 1936 she adapted the novel into a stage play of the same title. Lowndes based the story on the Bravo Murder Case, shifting the setting from the 1870s to the present day.

== Television adaptation ==
In 1963 it was adapted as an episode of the eight series of The Alfred Hitchcock Hour featuring Anne Francis, Ruth Roman and Gladys Cooper.

== Bibliography ==
- Borowitz, Albert. Blood & Ink: An International Guide to Fact-based Crime Literature. Kent State University Press, 2002.
- Kabatchnik, Amnon. Blood on the Stage, 1925-1950: Milestone Plays of Crime, Mystery, and Detection : an Annotated Repertoire. Scarecrow Press, 2010.
- Stewart, Victoria. Crime Writing in Interwar Britain: Fact and Fiction in the Golden Age. Cambridge University Press, 2017.
- Vinson, James. Twentieth-Century Romance and Gothic Writers. Macmillan, 1982.
- Wagner, Laura. Anne Francis: The Life and Career. McFarland, 2011.
