= Eardley Lancelot Holland =

British surgeon (1879–1967)

Eardley Lancelot Holland FRCS, FRCP, FRCOG
- Born: 29 October 1879
- Died: 21 July 1967 (aged 87)
- Occupation: Surgeon

Sir Eardley Lancelot Holland (29 October 1879 – 21 July 1967) FRCS, FRCP, FRCOG was a British surgeon and foundation fellow of the Royal College of Obstetricians and Gynaecologists. In 1943, he became the fifth president of the college.

== Education and early career ==
Holland graduated with first-class honours in medicine in 1905. Two years later, he became an M.D. and was awarded a gold medal for "midwifery and diseases of women". He spent time in Germany early in his career, with the distinguished gynaecologists Olhausen, Bumm, and Orth. Later on, he was a respected vaginal surgeon, the result of this early German training, where vaginal surgery was much more common than in England. This coincided with a time when obstetricians were increasingly being seen as gynaecological surgeons. "To see him operate in a case of neglected third degree tear of the perineum was to witness surgery as its precise best."

== Professional accomplishments ==
He was a temporary captain with the Royal Army Medical Corps during World War I during which time he was in command of No. 20 General Hospital.

Holland was known as one of the most impressive members of his profession between the wars. In 1923 a report he wrote into stillbirth was highly acclaimed by an author in the British Medical Journal.

Between 1937 and 1940, he was advisor in obstetrics to the Ministry of Health and organised the evacuation of pregnant women out of London at the start of World War II. In 1943, he became President of the Royal College of Gynaecologists and oversaw a report called A Report on a National Maternity Service, which was used as a model for that part of the NHS when it was set up after the war.

In 1949, Holland was President of the Twelfth British Congress of Obstetrics and Gynaecology. After the congress, he suggested new techniques for enquiring into maternal deaths. The result was the Confidential Enquiry into Maternal Deaths in England and Wales in 1952. Senior obstetricians in each region were tasked with collecting data about each death due to pregnancy or childbirth. The data was discussed at the ministry and regular meetings of the senior obstetricians. The appointed doctors were also well-positioned to coordinate "family doctors, midwives and consultants in applying in their obstetric practice the lessons learned from the Enquiry." The results were exceptional. Maternal mortality fell "from 44 per 10 000 births in 1928 to 7 in 1952 and to 1–6… in the years 1970–2." By 1976, the rate had fallen to less than 1 per 10 000 births.

Holland was known as an exceptionally hard-working doctor.

Even at the end of the longest day’s work, often after 10.00 pm, he would meet his registrar for that day’s quota of time allocated to the revision of a new edition of Eden’s Midwifery. The burden was always somewhat mollified by refreshment in the form of beer, but as well the chief's secretary saw to it that his needs for tobacco were fully met by a row of pipes filled by herself and left ready. The work could then go on far into the night, unless interrupted, as it often was, by a call to a midwifery case.

Holland was a prolific author, editor, and lecturer, and the recipient of many honors. He was knighted in 1946. The University of Leeds awarded him an honorary degree (LLD) in 1952. He wrote the Manual of Obstetrics, which ran to 12 editions and was used to teach innumerable students.

He was a founding Fellow of the Royal College of Obstetricians and Gynaecologists. As well as his hospital work and his private practice, he was a committed member of his profession.

Holland was a member of the Central Midwives Board; editor of the Journal of Obstetrics and Gynaecology of the British Empire; a member of the Board of Advanced Medical Studies of London University; and examiner in midwifery and diseases of women to the universities of Cambridge, London, and Durham, the Royal College of Surgeons of England, and the Central Midwives Board… He was also a member of the General Council of King Edward's Hospital Fund for London, where he interested him-self particularly in the provision of radium for the treatment of cancer.

== Personal life ==
Holland was first married to Dorothy Colgate, then to Olivia Constable. His obituary says that he married Olivia "some years later" than Dorothy's death. In fact, it was four months after Dorothy died, on 13 February 1952, that Eardley married "quietly in London... Miss Olivia Constable… only daughter of the late Mr. and Mrs. L. L. Constable."

== Personality ==
Holland was described by colleagues writing in response to his obituaries as "not immune to an irritable impatience" and "upright and grand, almost haughty". The food writer Patience Gray, who was Dorothy's niece, lived with the Holland's in London in 1930. She described him in her memoir:

At breakfast he gloomily, silently, savagely surveyed five females from the far end of the table, frowning, then with a grunted Umph! retired behind The Times emanating thunderous vibrations. Mercifully at 8.30 sharp he was solemnly swept away by a chauffeur in a limousine to operate at the London Hospital.

However, other colleagues remembered him as "courteous and considerate". One of his collaborators on the textbook British Obstetric Practice said, he had "a genius for friendship, which was evident in all the gatherings of his colleagues, owing to his lively interest in their affairs and work and a capacity or real affection for his close friends."

== Princess Charlotte ==
Holland was interested in Princess Charlotte, who died in childbirth. He published a monograph about the causes of her death in 1951. Holland left a large collection of Charlottiana to Brighton Pavilion in his will. He wanted it to be displayed as the Eardley Holland Collection, but it mostly remains in storage. There was an exhibition involving much of it in 2012/13. He shared this interest in Princess Charlotte with the writer Elizabeth Jenkins. Jenkins and Holland had an affair. Two years after the affair ended, Jenkins sent Holland a glass portrait of the Princess, knowing he was a collector. The princess appears in Jenkins' 1968 novel Honey on a tea tray that reads: "England mourns her Princess."
