= The Priory, Balham =

Priory in Wandsworth, London, England

Coordinates: 51°26′12″N 0°08′38″W

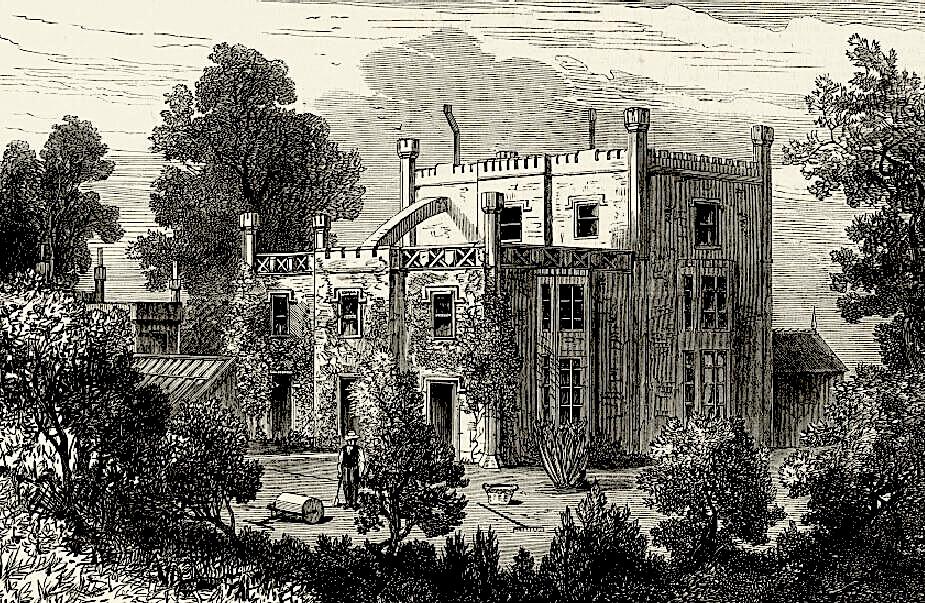
The Priory, Balham in 1876

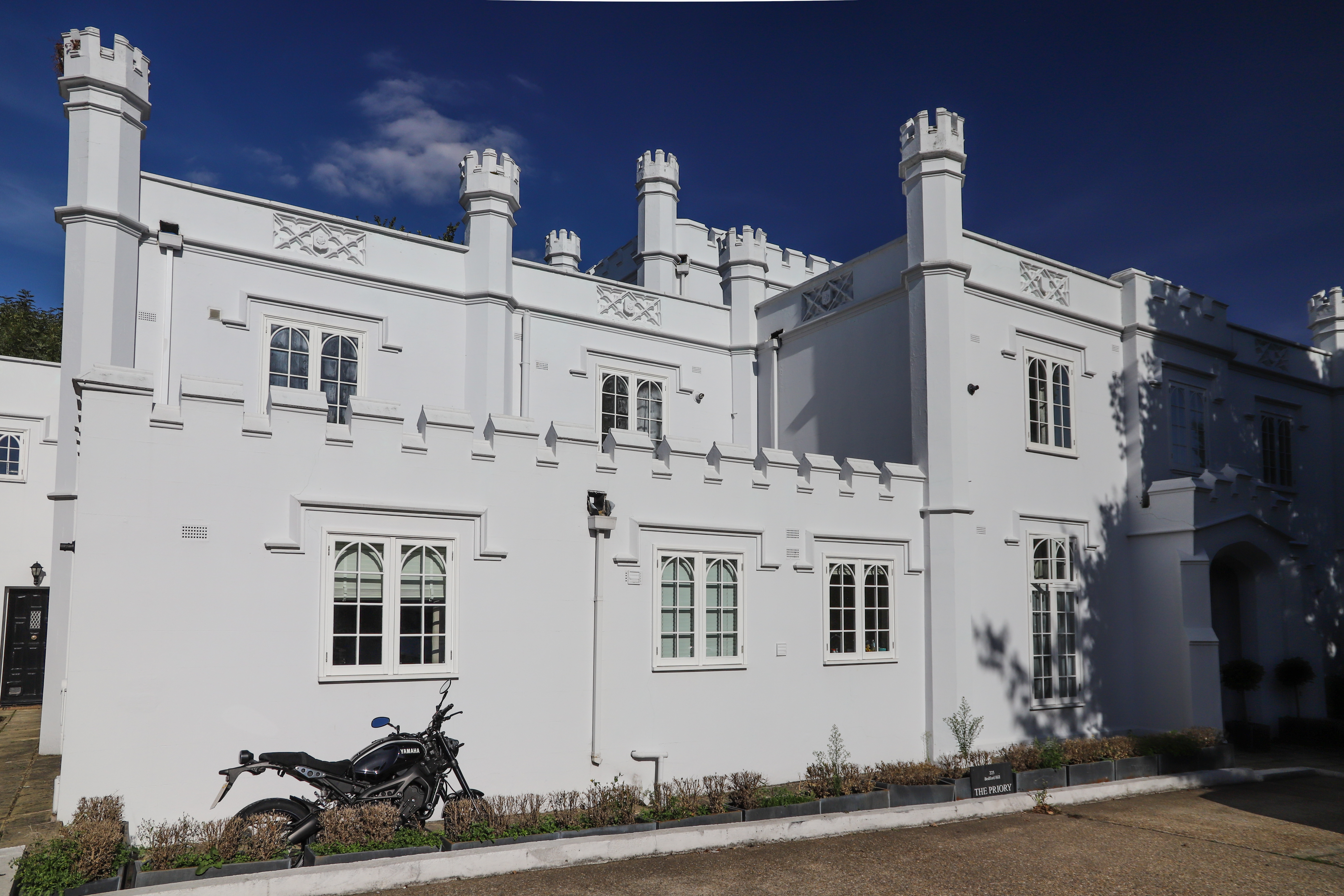
The Priory in 2018

The Priory, 225 Bedford Hill, Balham, London is a grade II listed building, and the scene in 1876 of the death by poisoning of the lawyer Charles Bravo.

The Priory is a double fronted Gothic Revival style villa built in 1812. It has been a grade II listed building since 1970.

After Charles Bravo's death, according to the Financial Times, it was "the most famous home in London."

It was converted into flats in 1981–1982.
