= William Wilfrid Webb =

Major of the Indian Medical Service (1857–1911)

Major William Wilfrid Webb (1857–1911) was an English officer and physician in the Indian Medical Service, Bengal Army. He was Superintendent of Gaols and Dispensaries for the Meywar and Bikanir States and guardian to the Maharaja of Bikanir.

== Origins ==
William Wilfrid Webb of Netley Abbey, county Hants, was born on 28 November 1857, and baptised at St. George's, Bloomsbury, London (by the Rev. Thomas William Webb, M.A., Prebendary of Hereford), on 20 May 1858.

== Career ==
He received the degree of M.D., and was appointed F.S.A. He resided for some years at Netley, and was appointed Curator of the Natural History Museum at the Royal Victoria Hospital, being awarded the Marin Memorial Gold Medal and the Sir Joseph Fayrer's prize for pathology at Netley in 1883. He also obtained several prizes in his medical training at Aberdeen University and at Charing-cross Hospital. At the university he was a prizeman in anatomy and chemistry, while at the hospital he was a silver medallist in botany and a prizeman in anatomy, medicine, and surgery.

He rose to the rank of Major in the Indian Medical Service, Bengal Army, and served in the 14th Sikhs, 29th Punjab Native Infantry, 2nd Regiment of Central India Horse, and Meywar Bhil Corps, and as Residency Surgeon at the Courts of the Maharana of Udaipur and the Maharaja of Bikanir, to the latter of whom he was guardian.

== Works ==
He was the author of a guide for intending candidates for commissions and for junior officers of the Indian Medical Service, a manual of vaccination, and a work in the currencies of the Hindu States of Rajputana. At various times he held medical and surgical appointments at the Great Northern Hospital, Hampstead, the Charing-cross Hospital and Medical School, and was an examiner to the St. Johns Ambulance Association.

== Personal life ==
He married Anna Claire, second daughter of Major General Archibald Tisdall (third surviving son of Charles Arthur Tisdall of Charlesfort, county Meath, J.P., High Sheriff for county Meath in 1811), by Anna Claire his wife, eldest daughter of Major Henry Walter Bellew of the Bengal Army; born at Chatham, county Kent, on 16 January, baptised at the Garrison Chapel, Chatham (by the Rev. H. Maskene, Chaplain to the Forces), on 4 March 1863; married at All Saints', Ajmere, Rajputana (by the Rev. Benjamin Henry Skelton, M.A.), on 23 October 1888. She was his second wife.

== Death ==
He died on Saturday, 18 November 1911, in his fifty-fourth year, at his residence, The Hermitage, Exeter.

== Sources ==
- Howard, Joseph Jackson; Crisp, Frederick Arthur (1900). Visitation of England and Wales. Vol. 8. Privately printed.
- Webb, William Wilfrid (1893). The Currencies of the Hindu States of Rájputána,. Westminster: A. Constable and Co.
- "Dr. W. W. Webb". The Times. 22 November 1911. p. 11.
