= Sir George Lewis, 1st Baronet =

English lawyer of Jewish extraction

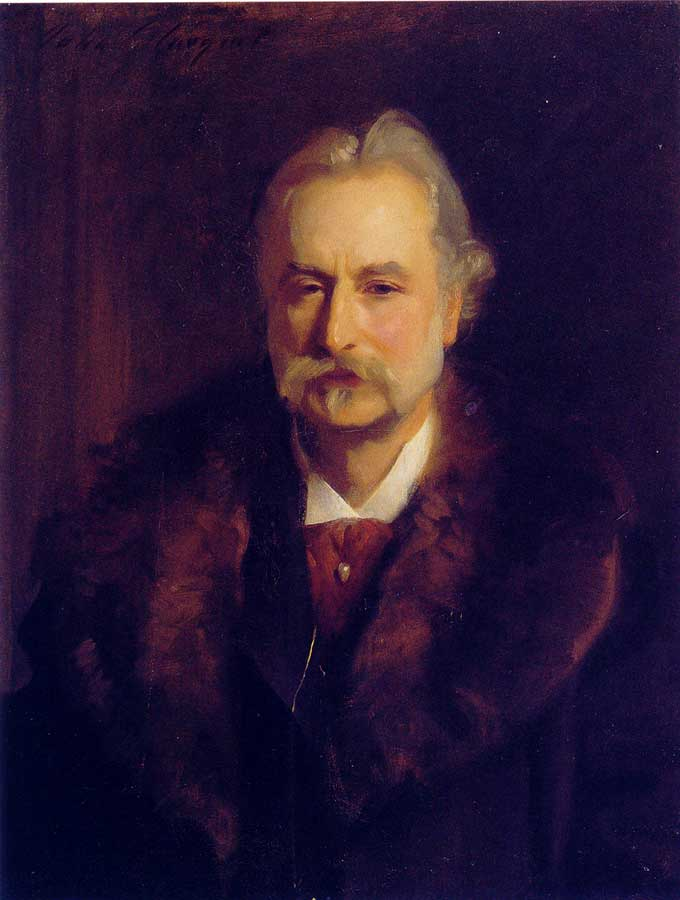
Portrait of Sir George Lewis, John Singer Sargent, 1896

Sir George Henry Lewis, 1st Baronet (21 April 1833 – 7 December 1911) was an English lawyer of Jewish extraction.

== Biography ==
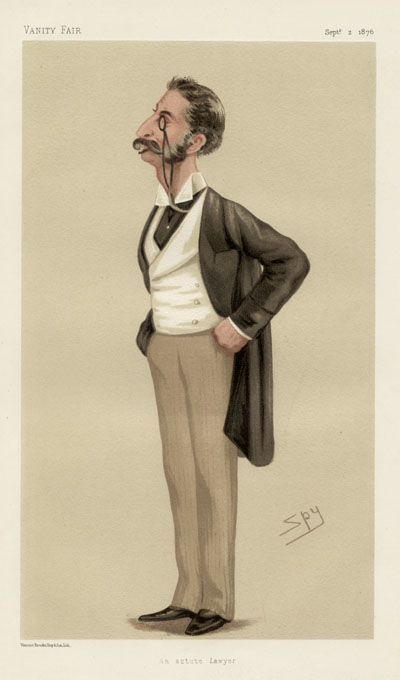
"an astute lawyer". Caricature by Spy published in Vanity Fair in 1876.

=== Solicitor ===
Lewis was born at 10 Ely Place, Holborn, London, and educated at University College, London. In 1850 he was articled to his father, James Graham Lewis (1804–1873), founder of Lewis & Lewis, one of the best-known firms of solicitors in the city of London. George was admitted in Hilary term in 1856, and was subsequently taken into partnership by his father and uncle. He first made his name in prosecuting the directors of the Overend and Gurney Bank, who had caused the disastrous panic of 1866, and for a time he devoted special attention to financial cases.

In criminal cases he drew public attention to himself by his cross-examination in the Bravo case in 1875, and from that time onward was connected with most criminal "causes célèbres," being conspicuous in the prosecution of fraudulent persons like Madame Rachel and Slade the medium. Among other cases may be mentioned the Hatton Garden diamond robbery case; the case involving Boulton and Park; Belt versus Lawes; and the Royal Baccarat Scandal, in which the Prince of Wales was called as a witness; and he was selected by the Parnell Commission to conduct the case for Charles Stewart Parnell and the Irish party against The Times. Lewis had by far the largest practise in financial cases of any lawyer in London, and was especially expert in libel cases, being retained by some of the chief newspapers. He showed himself especially skilful in exposing the practises of usurious money-lenders. One of the last cases he was involved in personally was the Archer-Shee case in 1908, the 14-year-old naval cadet expelled from Osborne College accused of stealing a five-shilling postal order, the basis of Rattigan's play The Winslow Boy.

He was well known as a tidy disposer of skeletons in closets. This earned him a mention in Arthur Conan Doyle's Sherlock Holmes story "The Adventure of the Illustrious Client". Speaking of a similar, fictional character named Sir James Damery, Holmes observes "He has rather a reputation for arranging delicate matters which are to be kept out of the papers. You may remember his negotiations with Sir George Lewis over the Hammerford Will case".

=== Honours and family ===
Lewis was knighted in 1893. It was announced that he would receive a baronetcy in the 1902 Coronation Honours list published on 26 June 1902 for the (subsequently postponed) coronation of King Edward VII, and on 24 July 1902 he was created a Baronet, of Portland place, in the borough of Marylebone. The Prime Minister, Arthur Balfour, apparently objected, but a grateful King overruled him.

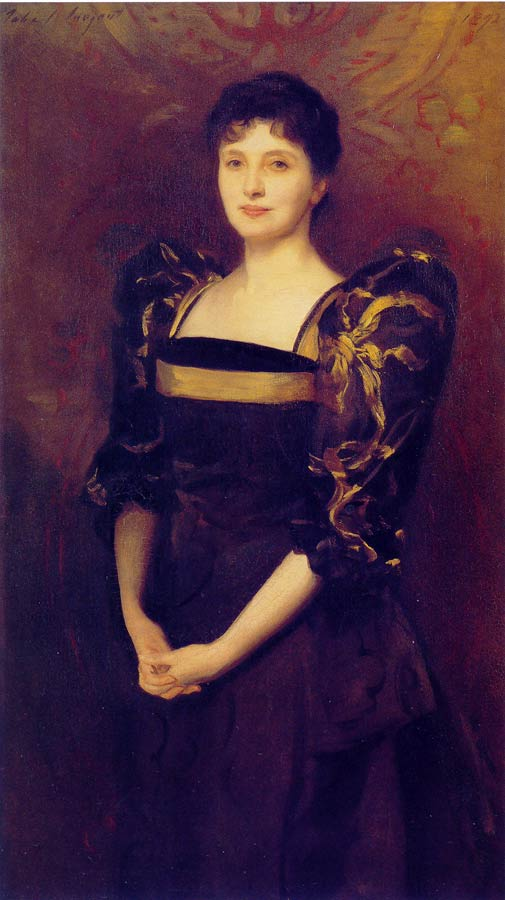
Mrs George Lewis (née Elizabeth Eberstadt), John Singer Sargent, 1892

Lewis was married twice:

- 1st to Victorine Kann (1840 Frankfurt/Germany – 21 April 1865 London), who died shortly after childbirth (daughter Alice Victorine Lewis)
- 2nd to Elizabeth Eberstadt (27 October 1844 Mannheim/Germany – 4 September 1931 London), daughter of Ferdinand Eberstadt of Worms/Mannheim and his wife Sara Seligmann. Elizabeth was sister of the professor of architecture in Berlin Rudolph Eberstadt and aunt of banker and philanthropist Otto Hermann Kahn in New York.

Lewis and Elizabeth had three children:

- George James Graham Lewis, 2nd Baronet, (1868–1927)
- Gertrude Rachel Lewis (1871 – after 1949), who married in 1902 Theodore B. Birnbaum
- Katherine Elizabeth Lewis (1878–1961).

In their London home, Sir George and Lady Lewis met 'tout le monde'. Juxon described it: "Over the next thirty years this house was to be thronged with painters, sculptors, musicians, actors, writers, lawyers, politicians, indeed, .... , to be invited to "Lady Lewis's" was to enter a social milieu at once fluid and eclectic.... Here the establishment and Bohemia had to embrace – because Elizabeth wanted them to."

He died on 7 December 1911 at Portland Place in London.

Baronetage of the United Kingdom
New creation	Baronet (of Portland Place and The Danish Pavilion); 1902–1911	Succeeded by George Lewis
