= James Manby Gully =

English physician (1808–1883)

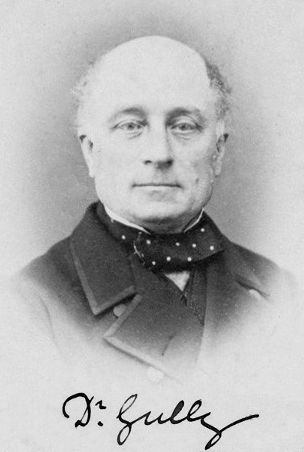
James Manby Gully in the 1860s

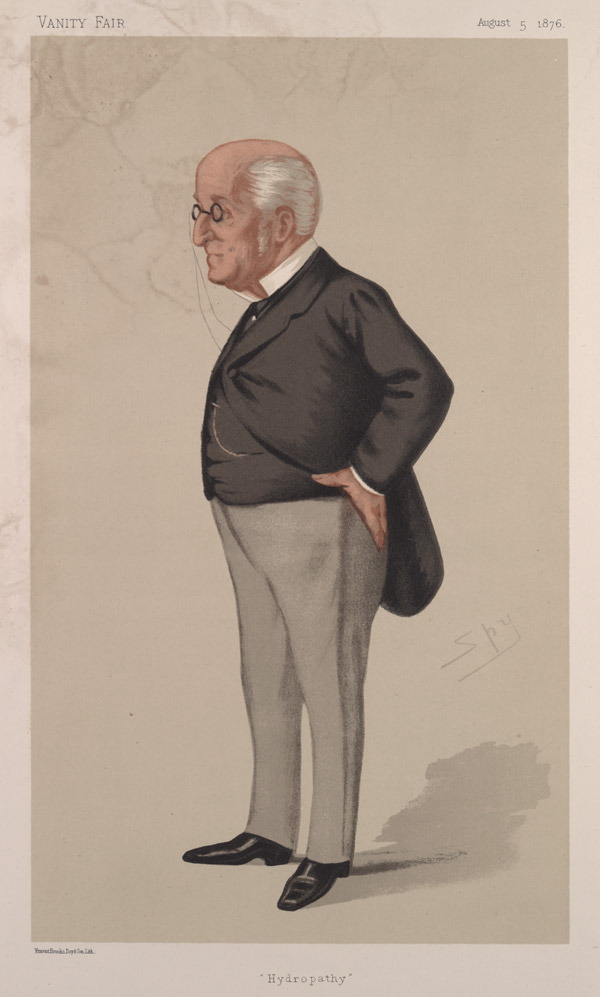
"Hydropathy". Caricature by Spy published in Vanity Fair in 1876.

James Manby Gully (14 March 1808 – 27 March 1883) was an English physician, well known for practising hydrotherapy. Along with his partner, he founded a very successful "hydropathy" clinic in Malvern, Worcestershire, which had many notable Victorians, including such figures as Charles Darwin and Alfred, Lord Tennyson, as clients.

Gully's clinic using Malvern water in Great Malvern, and those that followed, were largely responsible for Malvern's rapid development from a village to a large town. He is also remembered as a suspect in the Charles Bravo poisoning case, and as a recipient of payments from the Slavery Abolition Act 1833.

== Early life, education and family ==
James Manby Gully was born in Kingston, Jamaica, the son of Daniel Gully, a wealthy coffee planter. When he was 6 he was taken to England to attend school in Liverpool, then went on to the Collège Sainte-Barbe in Paris. He became a medical student at the University of Edinburgh in 1825, as did Charles Darwin in the same year. After three years at Edinburgh, Gully became an externe at L'École de Médecine in Paris, then returned to Edinburgh to take his MD in 1829.

He married Frances Court (died 1838), daughter of Thomas Court in June 1831. They had two children:

- Susanna Gully (1833-1903) married William Henry Jeffcock and had issue.
- William Court Gully, 1st Viscount Selby (1835-1909) married Elizabeth Selby and had issue.

Gully married secondly, Frances Kibble in October 1840.

Gully's father, Daniel, died in or before 1824. James Gully was awarded a share of compensation under the Slavery Abolition Act 1833 for the St George (Middelton) estate which had 42 enslaved people, and he was also party to a disputed claim for compensation for the St David (Sheffield) estate which had 80 enslaved people. Despite this record of compensation the Dictionary of National Biography states that "the fortune which should have fallen to him as his father's heir vanished on the passing of the Emancipation Act."

== Career ==
Gully began his practice as a physician in London in 1830, and went on to write and translate numerous medical books and papers, becoming a fellow of the Medical and Chirurgical Society of London and a fellow of the Royal Physical Society of Edinburgh. He edited the London Medical and Surgical Journal and the Liverpool Medical Gazette. Gully showed an interest in the idea of transmutation of species, and translated an evolutionary treatise on Comparative Physiology by the embryologist Friedrich Tiedemann.

He was dissatisfied with the medical treatments of the time, and in 1837 met Dr. James Wilson who then spent some time on the continent, and had returned enthused with the idea of hydrotherapy. Dr Wilson was one of the few Englishmen who stayed at the hydropathic establishment of Vincent Priessnitz, at Gräfenberg, Austria (now Lázně Jeseník, Czech Republic) before Captain R. T. Claridge, whose name became synonymous with hydropathy due to his 1842 book Hydropathy; or The Cold Water Cure, as practiced by Vincent Priessnitz... and his lecture tours. While acknowledging that Claridge did much to promote hydrotherapy, Wilson states that "I had been a considerable time at Grafenberg", and that Claridge "came to Graefenberg some time after I had been there". One writer states Wilson was at Grafenberg for 10 months. Nevertheless, in an earlier 1842 publication, Wilson acknowledged having read Claridge's work, and unconditionally praised his "enthusiastic" promotion of hydropathy.

In 1842, Gully and Wilson opened "water cure" clinics, and later established a partnership at Malvern offering a regimen similar to that at Priessnitz's Gräfenberg clinic. In 1843, Wilson and Gully published a comparison of the efficacy of the water-cure with drug treatments, including accounts of some cases treated at Malvern, combined with a prospectus of their Water Cure Establishment. Then in 1846 Gully published The Water Cure in Chronic Disease, further describing the treatments available at the clinic. In 1848, Gully became a member of the British Homoeopathic Society.

The fame of the water-cure establishment grew, and Gully and Wilson became well-known national figures. Two more clinics were opened at Malvern. Famous patients included Charles Darwin, Charles Dickens, Thomas Carlyle, Florence Nightingale, Lord Tennyson and Samuel Wilberforce. With his fame he also attracted criticism: Sir Charles Hastings, a physician and founder of the British Medical Association, was a forthright critic of hydropathy, and Dr Gully in particular.

== The Water Cure treatment ==
Dr. Gully's patients at Malvern were woken at 5 am, undressed and wrapped in wet sheets then covered with blankets. An hour later, buckets of water were thrown upon the patients who then went on a five-mile walk, carrying an alpenstock and a Gräfenberg flask of mineral water, stopping at wells for the waters. They returned to the Malvern pump room for a breakfast of dry biscuits and water. They then had the day to spend bathing in a range of kinds of baths, or in some cases wore a wet sheet called the "Neptune Girdle" round their middle at all times, removing it only at meal times. Dinner which was always boiled mutton and fish was followed by a few hours in a dry bed. The exercise, plain food and absence of alcohol together with the congenial company of other wealthy patrons proved generally beneficial.

=== Charles Darwin ===
Charles Darwin suffered repeated episodes of illness involving stomach pains from 1838 onwards, and had no success with conventional treatments. In 1849 after about four months of incessant vomiting, he followed the recommendation of his friend Captain Sulivan and cousin Fox. After reading Gully's book The Water-Cure in Chronic Disease, he rented a villa at Malvern for his family and started a two-month trial of the treatment on 10 March. Gully agreed with Darwin's self-diagnosis of nervous dyspepsia, and set him a routine including being heated by a spirit lamp until dripping with perspiration, then vigorous rubbing with cold wet towels and cold foot baths, a strict diet, and walks. Darwin enjoyed the attention and the demanding regime which left him no time to feel guilty about not working. His health improved rapidly and he felt that the water-cure was "no quackery". He had no faith in the homœopathic medicines Gully gave him three times a day, but took them obediently. They stayed on until 30 June, and at home he continued with the diet, and with the water treatment aided by his butler.

When his sickness returned in September, Darwin had a day visit to Malvern, then recuperated at home. In June 1850 after losing time to illness (without vomiting) he spent a week at Malvern. Later that year he wrote to Fox about the credulity of his "beloved Dr Gully" whose daughter had been ill, and had treated her with a clairvoyant girl to report on internal changes, a mesmerist to put her to sleep, John Chapman as homœopathist and himself as hydropathist, after which Gully's daughter recovered. Darwin explained to Fox his wrathful scepticism about clairvoyance and homeopathy. When Darwin's own young daughter Annie had persistent indigestion he confidently took her to Gully on 24 March 1851, and after a week left her there to take the cure, but a fortnight later was recalled by Dr Gully as Annie had bilious fever. Dr. Gully was attentive and repeatedly reassured them that she was recovering, but after a series of crises Annie died on 23 April. Gully gave the cause of death as a "Bilious fever with typhoid character".

Darwin kept records of the effects of the continuing water treatment at home, and in 1852 stopped the regime, having found that it was of some help with relaxation but overall had no significant effect, indicating that it served only to decrease his psychosomatic symptomatology. In 1855 Darwin wrote to a friend that "Dr. Gully did me much good", but he did not want to return to Malvern. When his illness returned much as when he had first seen Gully he found a new hydrotherapist, Dr. Lane, whose more relaxed regime did not include clairvoyance, mesmerism or homeopathy. After a similarly speedy recovery Darwin became a complete convert. In 1863 his illness worsened seriously at a time when Lane was not available, and Emma Darwin persuaded her husband to return to Gully. His cousin Fox had told him that Gully had suffered a mental breakdown and was unavailable. In his reply Darwin had mentioned having had eczema, and wrote "Gully will be a great loss & I hardly know whom to consult there. I must be under some experienced man, for I could not stand much hard treatment." They arrived at Malvern on 2 September, but Darwin felt that he was being fobbed off with the supervising physician, Dr. Ayerst. Emma arranged for Dr. Gully to attend and endorse Ayerst's treatment, but by then the eczema was too raw to bear any water. Darwin had a complete breakdown, and on 13 October left the spa worse than when he'd arrived. His serious illness continued until the spring of 1866.

== Beliefs and causes ==
Gully was an articulate and popular public speaker and writer. He was also a firm believer in a number of women's causes. He advocated women's suffrage, and preached temperance, due to the detrimental effects of alcohol on the husbands of many Victorian women. Gully built two clinics: Tudor House for men, and Holyrood House for women. He separated the sexes strictly at his clinics, as he believed that many female psychological complaints (depression, anxiety, hypochondria, hysteria) were due to the pressures Victorian women were under to be chaste, ambitionless, efficient, selfless givers, at the expense of their own mental well-being.

While Gully believed in the value of homeopathic medicines in some cases, adding a footnote about his positive experiences with homeopathy to later editions of his water-cure book and stating that "It is well and wise to observe and investigate these things before laughing at them”, he seems to have regarded the use of homeopathic remedies as an adjunct to his use of hydrotherapy, and does not appear to have agreed with the fundamental principles of homeopathy, writing in 1861, "It may shock the homœopathic world when I say that I never much cared for the doctrine of "like curing like"; and that I do not believe it to be of the universal application that they suppose". Like many of his educated contemporaries both in the UK, and in the USA Gully showed an interest in several popular movements of the day, such as women's suffrage, mesmerism and diagnostic clairvoyance. In later life he came to believe in spiritualism, being friend and protector to the medium Daniel Dunglas Home, was present at some of the manifestations of "Katie King" with Sir William Crookes and was President of the British Spiritualist Association in 1874.

== Affair with Florence Bravo ==
In 1872, he met a young married woman named Florence Ricardo (later Florence Bravo). They became secret lovers. The following year, after travelling with Gully to Kissingen in Germany, Florence became pregnant. Gully performed an abortion. Thereafter, their relationship became purely Platonic.

Florence subsequently met Charles Bravo, whom she married in 1875. On hearing the news from a third party, Gully reportedly tore the letter to shreds. Just a few short months later, on 18 April 1876, Charles Bravo died of poisoning. The culprit was never discovered; Gully was a suspect, along with Florence herself, but although he testified at the inquest, nothing further came of the case. In 1923, Sir Harry Poland QC, who was involved for the crown in the case, stated that "Dr. Gully was in no way implicated".

== Published works ==
- A systematic treatise on comparative physiology, introductory to the Physiology of man. Vol. I / [Friedrich Tiedemann]; translated, with notes, from the German, James Manby Gully and J. Hunter Lane, 1834
- Gully, James Manby (1835). Formulary for the Preparation and Employment of Several New Remedies. J. Churchill.
- 2nd edition (1836) Formulary for the Preparation and Medical Administration of Certain New Remedies...with Annotations and Additional Articles. John Churchill: London. and John Carfrae & Son, Edinburgh.
- Lectures on the moral and physical attributes of men of genius and talent, James Manby Gully, 1836
- Gully, James Manby (1837). An exposition of the symptoms, essential nature, and treatment of neuropathy, or nervousness. London: John Churchill.
- Gully, James M (1842). The simple treatment of disease deduced from the methods of expectancy and revulsion. London: John Churchill.
- Wilson, James; James M. Gully (1843). The Dangers of the Water Cure, and its Efficacy Examined and Compared with those of the Drug Treatment of Diseases; and an Explanation of its Principles and Practice; with an account of Cases Treated at Malvern, and a Prospectus of the Water Cure Establishment at That Place. London: Cunningham & Mortimer.
- Gully, James Manby (1850) [1846]. The Water-Cure in Chronic Disease; An Exposition of the causes, progress, and termination of various chronic diseases of the digestive organs, lungs, nerves, limbs, and skin; and of their treatment by water, and other hygienic means (3rd ed.). London: John Churchill.. Richard Metcalfe lists the publication dates of this book as: 1846 (1st ed), 1847 (2nd ed), 1850 (3rd ed), 1851 (4th ed), 1856 (5th ed), 1859 (6th ed). The following editions are also available online:
  - 4th English edition. London: John Churchill. 1851.
  - 1854 American edition. New York: Fowlers & Wells.
  - 5th English edition. London: John Churchill. 1856.
  - 1880 American edition. New York: S.R. Wells & Co. 1880.
- A guide to domestic hydro-therapeia: the water cure in acute disease, James Manby Gully, 1869
- Drawings descriptive of spirit life and progress. By a child twelve years of age, ed. James Manby Gully, 1874
- Gully, James M. (1885). A Monograph on Fever and its Treatment by Hydrotherapeutic Means. London: Simpkin, Marshall & Co. – Posthumous publication of unfinished work
