= Charles Bravo =

British lawyer and murder victim (1845–1876)

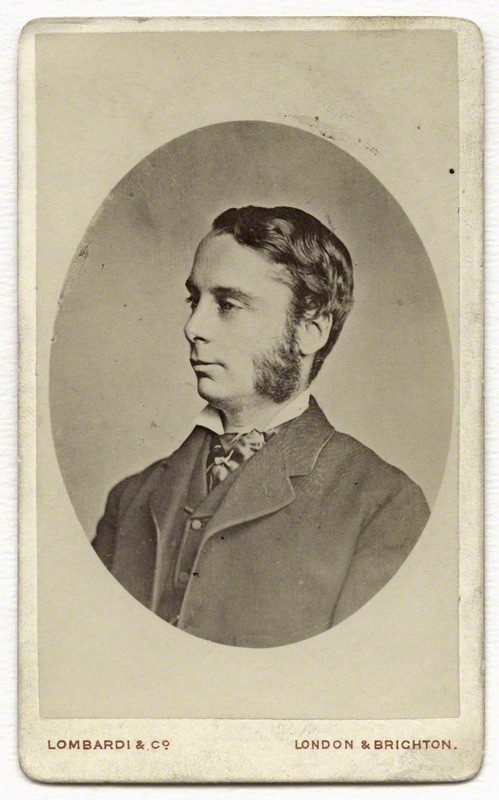
- Born: Charles Delauney Turner; 30 November 1845; St Pancras, London, England
- Died: 21 April 1876 (aged 30); Balham, London, England
- Cause of death: Antimony Poisoning

Charles Delauney Bravo (30 November 1845 – 21 April 1876) was a British lawyer who was fatally poisoned with antimony in 1876. The case is still sensational, notorious and unresolved. The case is also known as The Charles Bravo Murder and the Murder at the Priory.

It is an unsolved crime that was committed in an elite Victorian household at The Priory, a landmark house in Balham, London. Leading doctors attended the bedside, including the royal physician Sir William Gull, and all agreed that it was a case of antimony poisoning. The victim took three days to die, but gave no indication of the source of the poison during that time. No one was ever charged with the crime.

== Background ==
Charles Bravo was born Charles Delauney Turner in St Pancras, London, and baptised in Saint Helier, Jersey, in 1845. He was the son of Augustus Charles Turner and Mary Turner, but later took the surname Bravo from his stepfather, Joseph Bravo. He was educated at Trinity College, Oxford and the Middle Temple, and was called to the bar in 1870. By the time of his marriage to Florence Ricardo, daughter of Robert Campbell, he had fathered an illegitimate child.

His wealthy wife Florence Campbell had previously been married, in 1864, to Alexander Louis Ricardo, son of John Ricardo MP, but had been separated from him because of his affairs and violent alcoholism. She herself had had an extramarital affair with the much older Dr James Manby Gully, a fashionable society doctor who was also married at the time, and she had fallen out of favour with her family and society. Ricardo died in 1871 and Florence married Charles, a respected up-and-coming barrister, on 7 December 1875, terminating her affair with Gully.

Police inquiries in the case revealed that Charles's behaviour towards Florence was controlling, mean, violent and bullying. Florence was wealthier than Charles and had opted from the start to hold onto her own money, an option only recently provided by the Married Women's Property Act 1870. This led to tensions within the marriage.

== Poisoning ==
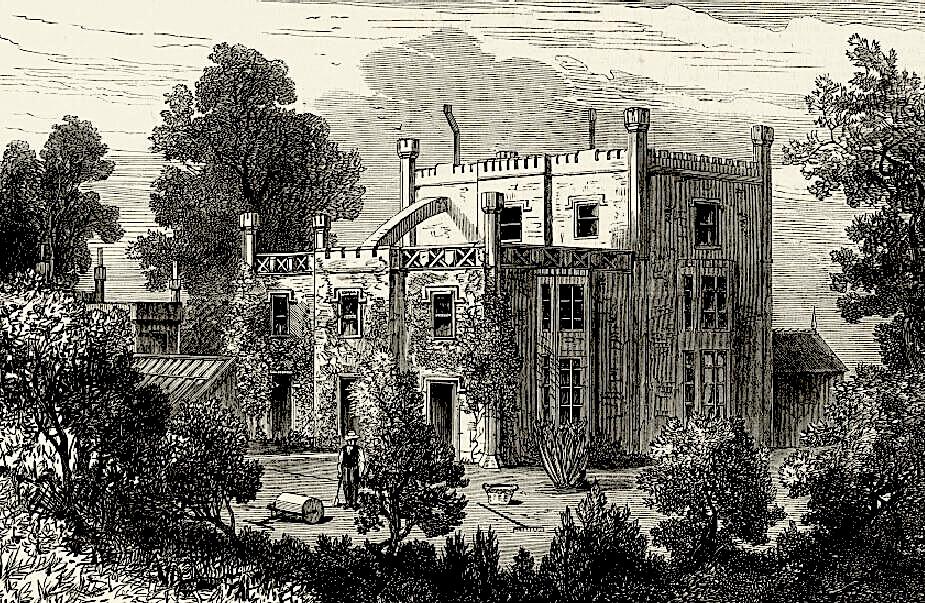
The Priory, Balham in 1876

The poisoning of Charles Bravo occurred four months into the marriage. Bravo's death was drawn out, lasting from two to three days, and painful. It was particularly notable that he did not offer any explanation of his condition to the attending doctors.

One hypothesis is that Charles Bravo was slowly poisoning his wife with small cumulative doses of antimony in the form of tartar emetic, which explains the chronic illness that she suffered from since shortly after their marriage. While treating himself with laudanum for a toothache before going to bed he mistakenly swallowed some; then took the tartar emetic, mistakenly believing it was a true emetic that would induce vomiting. Their housekeeper Mrs Cox reportedly told police that when they were alone together, Charles had admitted using the tartar emetic on himself; but she later changed her statement, perhaps to deflect suspicion from herself to Florence.

Other investigators have offered different suggestions as to what happened to cause the poisoning, including suicide, murder by the housekeeper Mrs. Cox (whom Bravo had threatened to sack), murder by Florence, and murder by a disaffected groom whom Bravo had discharged from employment at The Priory.

== Aftermath ==
Two inquests were held, and the details were considered to be so scandalous that women and children were banned from the room while Florence Bravo testified. The searching cross-examination launched the career of the lawyer George Henry Lewis. The first inquest returned an open verdict. The second inquest returned a verdict of willful murder, but no one was ever arrested or charged.

The household broke up after the inquest ended and the twice-widowed Florence moved away to Southsea, Hampshire. She died at 33 of alcohol poisoning two years later on Tuesday 24 (possibly 17) September 1878.

== In popular culture ==
- The 1926 novel What Really Happened by Marie Belloc Lowndes is inspired by the Bravo case, updating the setting to the 1920s.
- The 1947 novel For Her to See by Joseph Shearing (pseudonym of Marjorie Bowen) has elements of the Bravo poisoning in its plot. It was later made into a film So Evil My Love.
- The novel Below Suspicion by John Dickson Carr also has elements of the Bravo case in the first murder.
- Agatha Christie's Ordeal by Innocence refers to the Bravo case as a case unsolved, the permanent shade of suspicion thus destroying the lives of the innocent (Florence Bravo, Dr. Gully and Mrs. Cox, or at least two of them). Christie also makes mention of the case in Elephants Can Remember and in The Clocks, where Poirot claims that "there is no doubt in my mind ... the companion may have been involved, but she was certainly not the moving spirit in the matter".
- Jessie Louisa Rickard's novel Not Sufficient Evidence (1926) is a fictionalized account of the Bravo case.
- The graphic novel From Hell by Alan Moore and Eddie Campbell briefly features both Charles and Florence Bravo in Chapter 2. One of the protagonists is the royal physician Sir William Gull, who is shown attending Charles Bravo on his deathbed.
- Shirley Jackson's novel We Have Always Lived in the Castle was inspired by the Charles Bravo mystery.
- The case features in the first episode of Edward Woodward's TV series In Suspicious Circumstances.
- Dramatised by the BBC in 1975 as a three-part serial, written by Ken Taylor and directed by John Glenister as The Poisoning of Charles Bravo.
- The case was featured in an episode of Julian Fellowes Investigates: A Most Mysterious Murder, starring Michael Fassbender as Bravo.
